= S76 =

S76 may refer to:

- S76 (Long Island bus)
- S76 (New York City bus) serving Staten Island
- Brooks Seaplane Base, in Kootenai County, Idaho, United States
- Daihatsu Hijet (S76), a Japanese van
- Fiat S76 Record, a land speed record vehicle
- Sikorsky S-76, an American helicopter
