= Citylink (Idaho) =

Public transportation service in Idaho, US

- Commenced operation: November 1, 2005
- Headquarters: Coeur d'Alene, Idaho
- Locale: Kootenai County, Idaho
- Routes: 6
- Stops: 150
- Hubs: 2
- Fleet: 20 buses
- Annual ridership: 196,358 (2024)
- Website: Idaho Citylink

Citylink is a public transportation system in Kootenai County, Idaho, United States. The agency operates six bus routes in urban areas of the county, including the cities of Coeur d'Alene and Post Falls, that run for 13 hours a day, six days a week. Patrons are not charged a fare on Citylink buses. Citylink is funded by the Coeur d'Alene Tribe, Kootenai County, Kootenai Health, and the Federal Transit Administration. As of 2012, the agency's bus fleet consists of 20 buses that can seat up to 33 passengers and are equipped with wheelchair lifts and bicycle racks.

== History ==
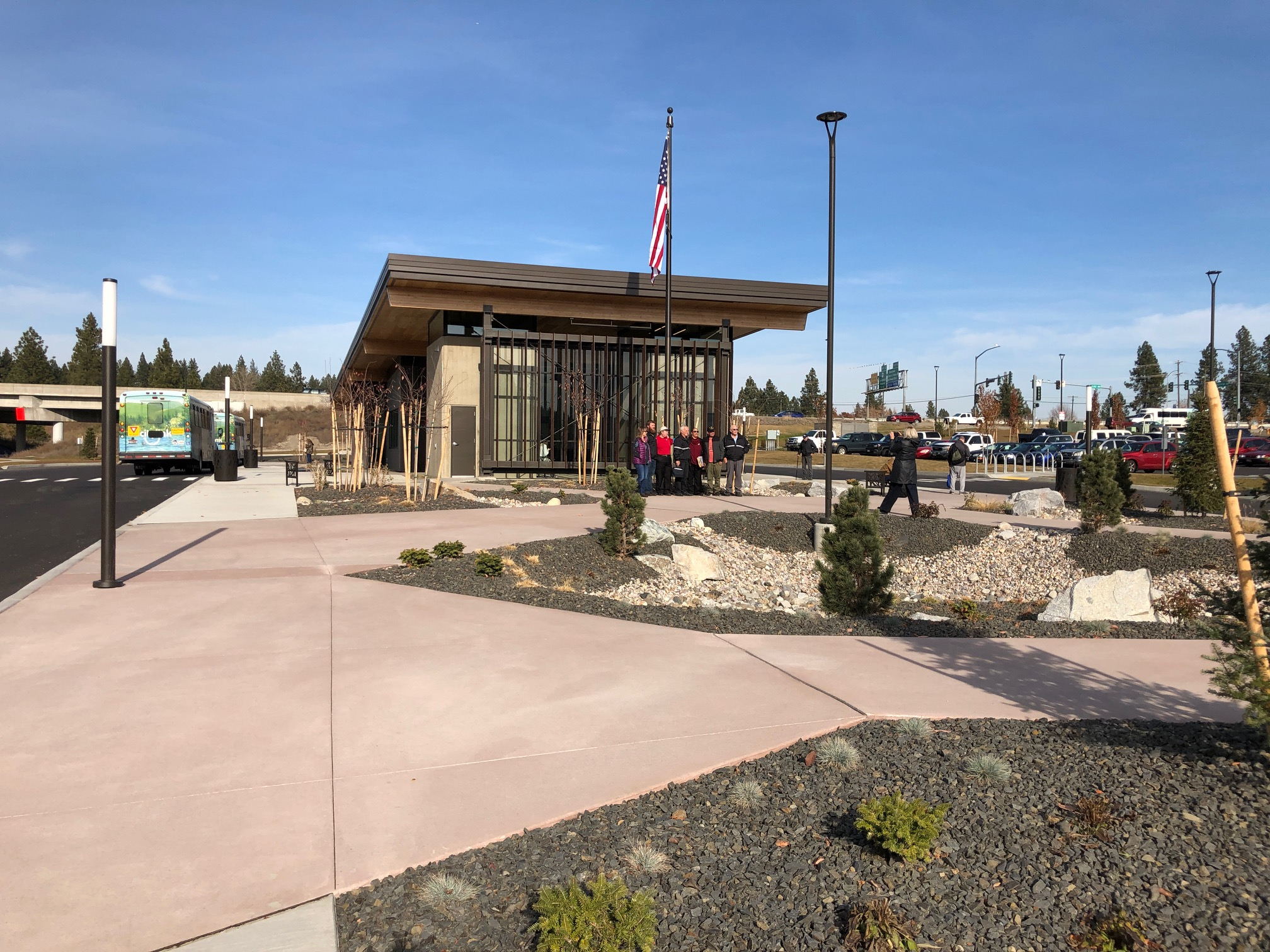
Riverstone Transit Center in 2019

Citylink began operating on November 1, 2005, funded primarily by a $1.38 million Federal Transit Administration grant that was matched by the Coeur d'Alene Tribe.

Budget cuts in April 2012 caused a major restructure in Citylink service, including the elimination of a route to State Line, the addition of 125 stops to the system, increased frequencies on services operating out of Riverstone, and the elimination of one-way loops on urban routes B and C. The permanent Riverstone Transit Center opened in 2019, with public restrooms and a reception area.

Extension of Spokane Transit Authority service into Idaho, mainly an hourly express bus from Coeur d'Alene to Spokane, was proposed as part of the 2015 "STA Moving Forward" ballot measure, which failed to pass. This was again proposed in 2016, as part of the "Proposition 1" ballot measure, which successfully passed. Service is expected to commence in 2026 between Spokane Valley and Post falls.
