= The Salvation Army Ray and Joan Kroc Center Coeur d'Alene =

Community center in Idaho, US

Coordinates: 47°42′20″N 116°48′37″W

The Salvation Army Ray and Joan Kroc Corps Community Center Coeur d'Alene, Idaho
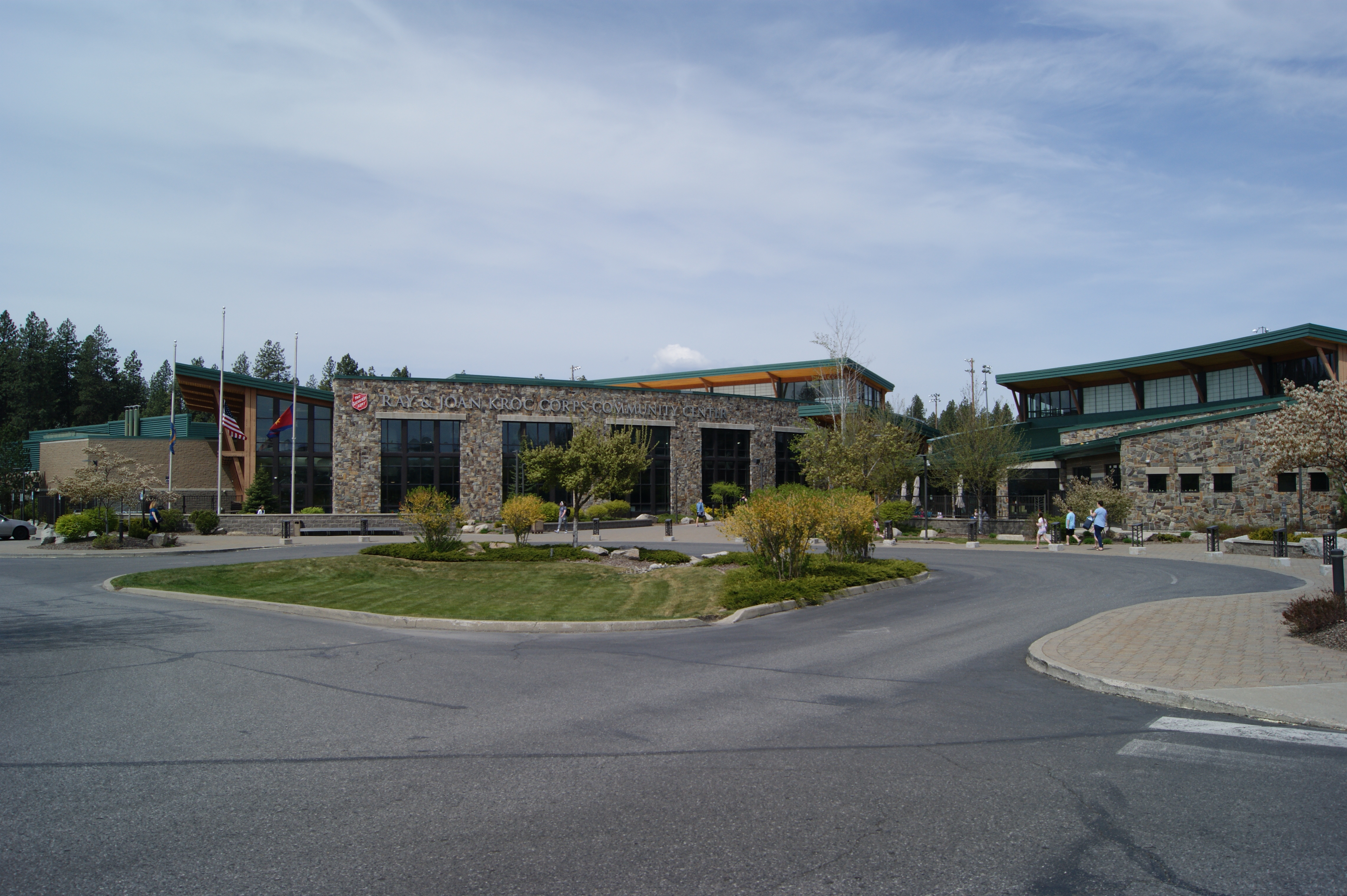
- Company type: Non-profit
- Industry: Community Center, fitness, swimming, programming, and recreation
- Founded: May 11, 2009
- Headquarters: 1765 W. Golf Course Road, Coeur d'Alene, Idaho
- Key people: Lieutenants Jeff and Kristin Boyd, Executive Directors
- Website: www.kroccda.org

The 130,000-square-foot (12,000 m^{2}) Salvation Army Ray and Joan Kroc Center Coeur d'Alene has been designed to serve as a place of gathering and enrichment houses an array of education, sports, faith, arts and supportive programs.

In 2003, Joan Kroc, wife of McDonald's founder Ray Kroc, died, and entrusted to The Salvation Army the largest gift ever given to a private charity, for the express purpose of building and endowing Kroc Centers, envisioned as state-of-the-art recreational and arts facilities in under-served communities throughout the nation.

The Kroc Center in Coeur d'Alene, Idaho is a nearly $70 million investment in the community set among 12 acres (49,000 m^{2}). The Kroc Center houses four major components: a center of worship and performance venue, an aquatics center, a fitness and recreation center, and special event facilities as well as arts, education, and wellness programming.

== Facilities and programs ==
The Kroc Center in Coeur d’Alene offers many different venues for wellness and the arts. It includes a large aquatics area, including a 25 x 25 meter 8-lane competition lap pool that is a twin of the pool used in the 2008 Olympics. It also houses an 11,000-square-foot (1,000 m^{2}) leisure pool with water slides, spray features, a "lazy river", and adult and family spas.

The Sports Training and Recreation Center houses one of the largest spaces in The Kroc Center, the 13,860-square-foot (1,288 m^{2}) Multi-Activity Court Gym with specialized rounded corners for indoor soccer. The Wellness Center also includes a 5,350-square-foot (497 m^{2}) wellness area with cardio and weight training areas, an elevated walk/jog track, a climbing wall and an aerobics studio.

The Performing Arts Theater has the ability to hold small to medium performance events, music concerts, and theater productions, with seating of up to 350 people.

== Church ==
The Kroc Center Church is a place of worship and service open to everyone. The church follows The Salvation Army Mission.
