= Silver Lake Mall =

Coordinates: 47.73167°N 116.7897°W

- Location: Coeur d'Alene, Idaho, United States
- Opened: 1989
- Developer: Price Development Corporation
- Manager: Silver Lake Center LLC
- Owner: Black Sheep Sporting Goods
- Num. of stores: 34
- Num. of anchor tenants: 2
- Floor area: 325,046 square feet (30,197.8 m^{2})
- Floors: 1

Silver Lake Mall is a shopping mall located in Coeur d'Alene, Idaho. It is the largest indoor shopping center in North Idaho. Its anchor stores are Black Sheep Sporting Goods and Planet Fitness.

== History ==
Silver Lake Mall opened in July 1989 and was developed by Price Development Corporation. The mall had Emporium, Fred Meyer Apparel, JCPenney, and Sears as its original anchor stores.

In 1992, Lamonts replaced Fred Meyer Apparel. Gottschalks later acquired Lamonts after the latter filed for bankruptcy in 2000.

In 2002, The Bon Marché, rebranded Macy's in 2005, replaced Gottschalks.

Emporium closed in 2003 following its bankruptcy filing and was replaced by Timberline Trading. In 2013, Timberline Trading, which relocated to two smaller spaces in the mall, was replaced by Sports Authority. Sports Authority later closed in 2016.

Sears, JCPenney, and Macy's closed in 2018, 2021, and 2025, respectively. Sears was replaced by Planet Fitness in 2019.

In 2021, the mall was acquired by the owners of Black Sheep Sporting Goods, which opened several shops in the mall.
