= Real Life Ministries =

Non-denominational Evangelical Christian church in Idaho

Coordinates: 47°43′34″N 116°54′09″W

Real Life Ministries is a non-denominational, Evangelical Christian church in Post Falls, Idaho, USA, situated in Kootenai County. The church was planted in 1998 by four families, including the now senior pastor and elder, Jim Putman. Since its founding, the church has grown to an average weekend attendance of over 7,000 and has become one of the fastest-growing churches in the United States, ranking 13th in a 2007 report.

== History ==
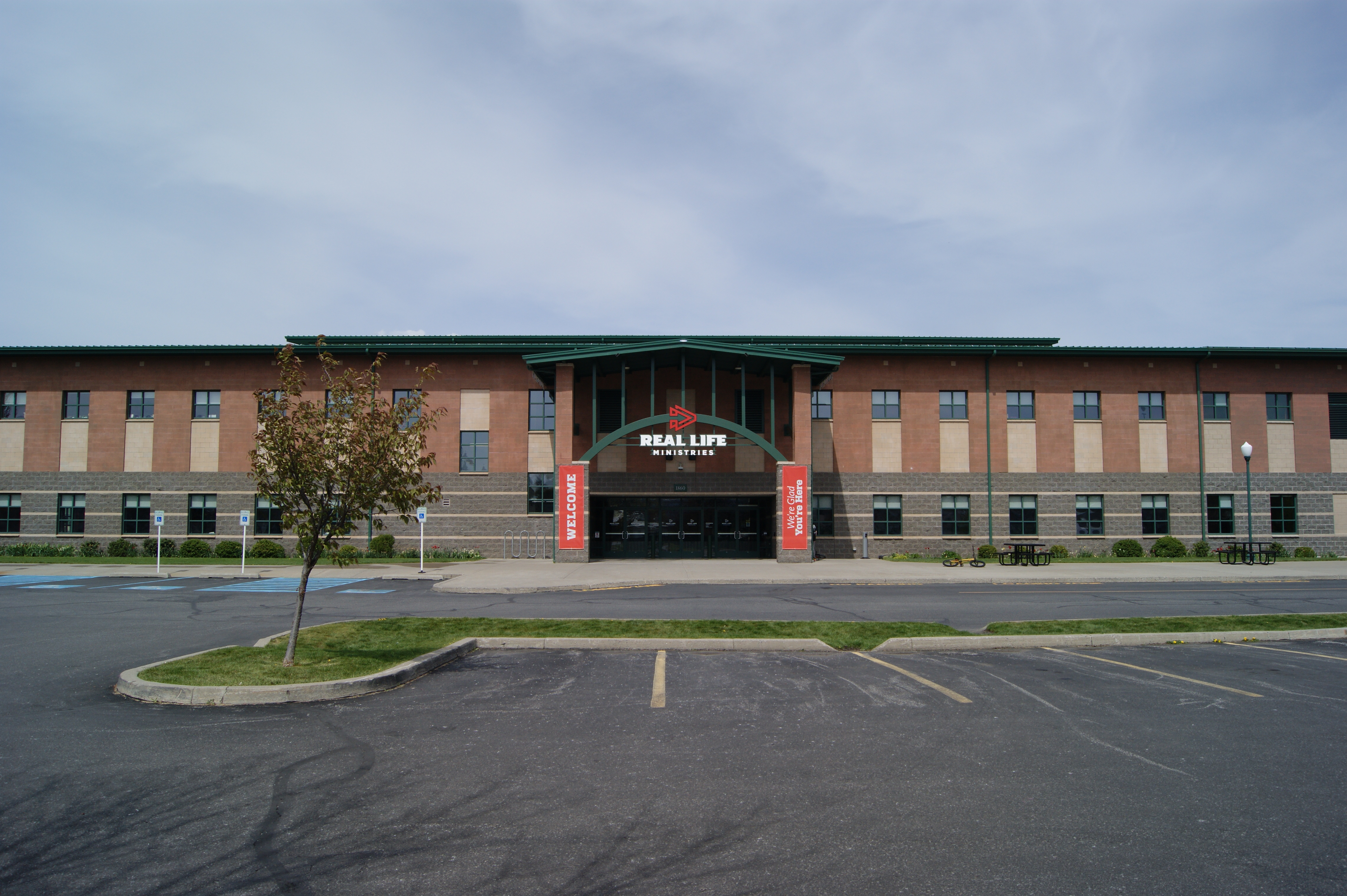
The auditorium on the Post Falls campus

The church began by meeting in private homes until the numbers became too great, at which time it was able to rent space in a movie theater. In 1999, Church Development Fund stepped in to buy 33 acres (130,000 m^{2}) of land in Post Falls, through its Advanced Land Purchase program, in order for the church to build a facility to serve the 850 in weekly attendance at that time. The church moved into a 26,000-square-foot (2,400 m^{2}) building on that property in 2001, but quickly outgrew it.

In 2004, the church built a 68,000-square-foot (6,300 m^{2}) facility, with a multi-purpose 1,700 seat auditorium, also on the same property. Real Life Ministries has purchased an additional 14 acres (57,000 m^{2}) plus a home, for a total of 47 acres (0.19 km^{2}) at the current site. The Church's master plan for the current site included a 3,600 seat main building, a softball field and a youth center. It has been a borrower of CDF for land purchases and all phases of construction.

In a 22 June 2006 letter to the Coeur d'Alene Press (CDA Press), RLM's financial accountability was questioned. The writer suggested RLM seek certification from the Evangelical Council for Financial Accountability as other large churches had done. RLM responded with its own letter to the CDA Press on 15 July, describing its accounting practices and stating that it would seek ECFA certification as an additional measure of outside accountability. In December 2008, the ECFA accepted RLM's application.

== Expansion issues ==
With its congregation continuing to grow, Real Life Ministries has purchased a 124-acre (0.50 km^{2}) plot of land for a new site, again borrowing funds from the Church Development Fund. Preliminary plans for the new property include an expandable 3,500 seat auditorium, state-of-the-art children's facility, a 300-seat chapel, field house and six multi-use sports fields. The property, however, has no water rights (according to the deed recorded at the county), no septic hook-up, and access roads have not been widened nor brought up to highway standards. According to the Conditional Use Permit Agreement, RLM will fund a traffic study and infrastructure improvements, including but not limited to reconstructing two adjacent roads, before receiving any building permits. Senior Pastor Jim Putman has said that while plans to build on the new property have been shelved, the real need now is for RLM to build the sports fields on the new property.

After spending more than $750,000 on the new property project, Putman announced in July 2008 that RLM will not begin construction on the 124-acre (0.50 km^{2}) parcel of land, saying "...at this time at least the new building is out of reach. Other options must be explored as a temporary solution until the time when what’s required can be afforded (initial estimates being $40 million). Also in his July 2008 announcement, he suggested home church as one potential option, saying, "Maybe doing church on Sunday in our homes? How do we keep reaching people but not get in over our heads financially." The July 2008 statement also said, "We believe the move to the new property is something God wants us to do, but the timing has always been in question." Earlier in the project, Putman was quoted as saying, we believe "Jesus has shown us He is all in, now we will wait for Him to tell us when." In 2025, the church financed the construction of a freshwater well in a water-restricted country in honor of Pastor Gene Jacobs, who died in 2024.

== Boise Bible College–Post Falls ==
In 2004, Boise Bible College launched the Post Falls Center in co-operation with Real Life Ministries. The extension site combined the discipleship process developed by RLM with the Biblical training provided by BBC, resulting in an A.S. in Biblical leadership. This co-operative extension site was no longer active in February 2009.
