= Brooks Seaplane Base =

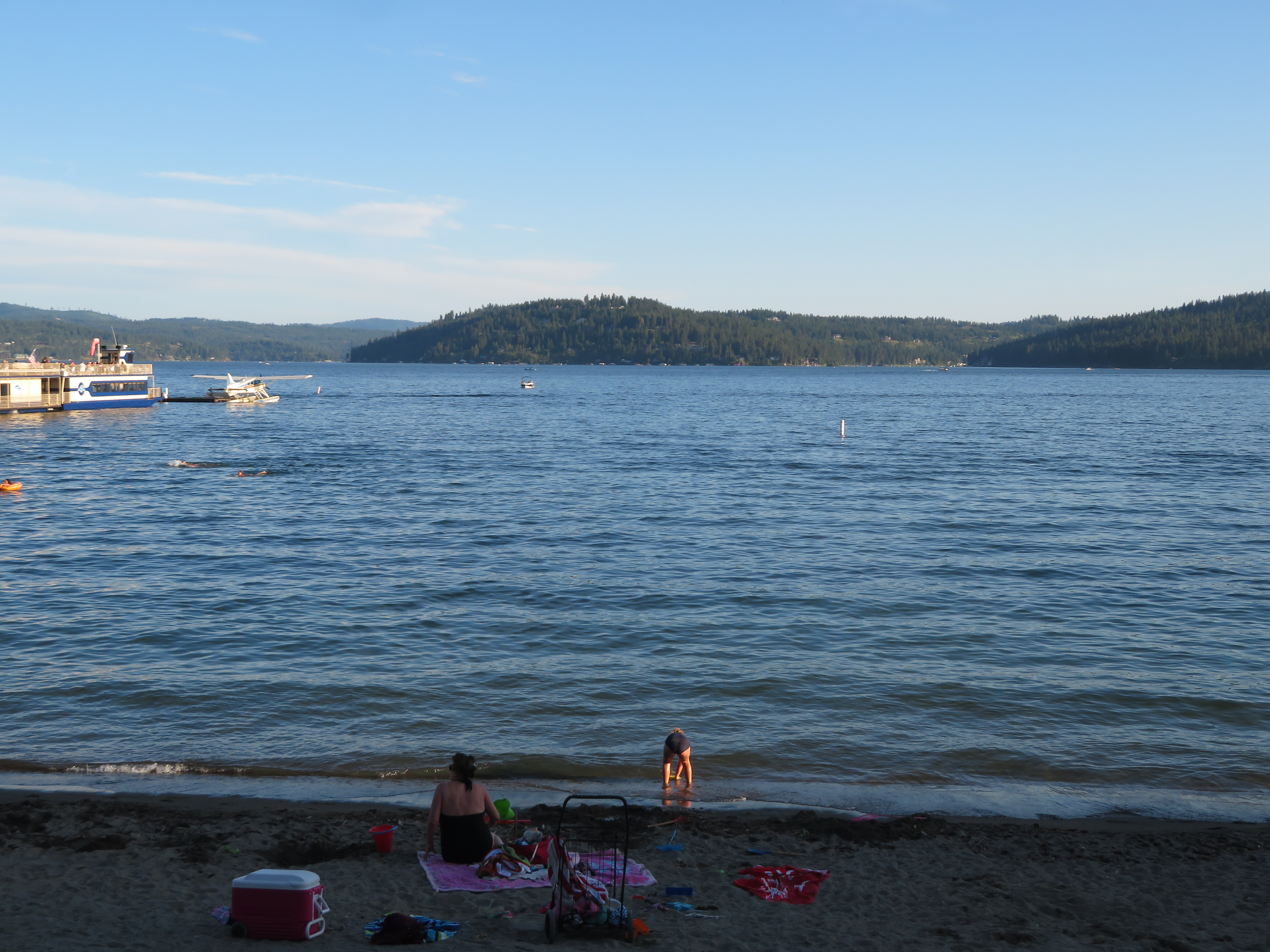
- IATA: none; ICAO: none; FAA LID: S76

Summary
- Airport type: Public
- Owner: City of Coeur d'Alene
- Serves: Coeur d'Alene, Idaho
- Elevation AMSL: 2,125 ft (648 m)
- Coordinates: 47°40′20″N 116°47′10″W

Map
- Interactive map of Brooks Seaplane Base

Runways
Direction	Length		Surface
Direction	ft	m	Surface
11/29	15,000	4,572	Water
15/33	15,000	4,572	Water

Statistics (2006)
- Aircraft operations: 2,900
- Source: Federal Aviation Administration

Brooks Seaplane Base (FAA LID: S76) is a city-owned, public-use seaplane base located in the city of Coeur d'Alene, Kootenai County, Idaho, United States. It is located on Lake Coeur d'Alene.

== Facilities and aircraft ==
Brooks Seaplane Base has two landing areas designated 11/29 and 15/33, each measuring 15,000 x 2,000 feet (4,572 x 610 m). For the 12-month period ending September 27, 2006, the airport had 2,900 aircraft operations, an average of 242 per month: 59% general aviation and 41% air taxi.

== Accidents and incidents ==
On July 5, 2020, two aircraft, a Cessna 206 and a de Havilland Canada DHC-2 Beaver collided over Lake Coeur d'Alene killing all eight aboard both planes. The de Havilland floatplane had originated from Brooks Seaplane Base and was carrying 48-year old professional golfer Sean Fredrickson and his three children on a seaplane tour. Fredrickson served as the president of the Pacific Northwest PGA Section.

== See also ==
- List of airports in Idaho
