= Spectrum Telecoms =

- Company type: Private limited company
- Industry: Telecommunications
- Founded: 1996
- Founder: Simon Holt
- Headquarters: Burton-upon-Trent, Staffordshire
- Key people: Simon Holt CEO, Jenny Lee Holt Director
- Products: Unified communications, Managed private networks, Cloud and hosted services, Enterprise mobility, Network Security

Spectrum Telecoms is an independent business connectivity provider, supplying a range of business IP and communications services.

== Company Overview ==
Spectrum Telecoms is the trading name for Spectrum Telecommunications Ltd. Spectrum was founded by Simon Holt in 1996. The company was created with the aim of providing traditional fixed line services, account management and systems. By building a network of supplier partnerships the business grew into inbound, outbound, mobile and data networks .

In 2013, the company moved from Barton-under-Needwood into larger premises, located on the Centrum 100 Business Park, Burton upon Trent.

In December 2013, the company became an authorised supplier for Connection Vouchers. The Scheme is managed by Broadband Delivery UK (BDUK), a unit within the Department for Culture, Media and Sport.

== Products & Services ==
Spectrum Telecoms provides products and services in 5 main categories:

- Unified communications
- Managed private networks
- Cloud and hosted services
- Enterprise mobility
- Network security

== PR & Social Responsibility ==
Spectrum's Director Jenny Lee Holt judged the 2016 finals of the West Midlands Young Enterprise Company of the Year, held at the Lichfield Garrick Theatre. The award was won by the Students of Alleyne's High School in Staffordshire.
