= Interstate 90 in Idaho =

Highway in Idaho

Interstate 90
- Purple Heart Trail
- I-90 highlighted in red

Route information
- Maintained by ITD
- Length: 73.888 mi (118.911 km)
- Existed: 1957–present
- History: Completed in 1991
- NHS: Entire route

Major junctions
- West end: I-90 at the Washington state line in Stateline
- SH-41 in Post Falls; US 95 in Coeur d'Alene; SH-97 near Coeur d'Alene; SH-3 near Cataldo; I-90 BL / SH-4 in Wallace
- East end: I-90 at the Montana state line near Mullan

Location
- Country: United States
- State: Idaho
- Counties: Kootenai, Shoshone

Highway system
- Interstate Highway System; Main; Auxiliary; Suffixed; Business; Future; Idaho State Highway System; Interstate; US; State
← US 89	→ US 91

Interstate 90 (I-90) is a transcontinental Interstate Highway that runs east–west across the northern United States. Within the state of Idaho, the freeway travels for 74 miles (119 km) from the Washington border near Spokane to Coeur d'Alene and the panhandle region at the north end of the state. After traveling through the Silver Valley along the Coeur d'Alene River in the Bitterroot Range, I-90 crosses into Montana at Lookout Pass.

I-90 was created by the federal government in 1957, following the general route of U.S. Route 10 (US 10) and the mid-19th century Mullan Road constructed by the U.S. Army. The freeway was constructed in stages between 1960 and 1992.

== Route description ==
Interstate 90 enters Idaho at a crossing of the Spokane River in the community of State Line in Kootenai County, approximately 20 miles (32 km) east of Spokane, Washington. The freeway travels northeast through the Rathdrum Prairie and into the outskirts of Post Falls, passing several retailers and a business park along the Spokane River. I-90 continues east along the river, paralleled to the south by the North Idaho Centennial Trail and a section of the BNSF Railway, and passes near the eponymous Post Falls and the city's downtown, served by a signed business route. The freeway intersects State Highway 41 (SH-41) and continues through the city's eastern residential neighborhoods and passes the nearby town of Huetter. I-90 then reaches Coeur d'Alene, the largest city in northern Idaho, and intersects a business route and US-95, the state's main north–south highway, near the Kootenai Medical Center.

The freeway travels around the north and east sides of central Coeur d'Alene, intersecting several local streets in the process, and turns southeast towards Fernan Lake and Lake Coeur d'Alene on the Spokane River. I-90 ascends Potlatch Hill and makes several stair-step turns to follow the northern shore of Lake Coeur d'Alene while traversing several forested hills. It passes 240 feet (73 m) over a valley overlooking Bennett Bay on the Veterans Memorial Centennial Bridge, a high concrete bridge that was completed in 1987. The freeway descends from the hills and travels southeasterly along Wolf Lodge Bay, passing Coeur d'Alene Parkway State Park and intersecting the northern terminus of the Lake Coeur d'Alene Scenic Byway (SH-97) at the east end of the lake. I-90 continues east along Cedar Creek into the Coeur d'Alene Mountains, part of a national forest, and reaches Fourth of July Summit at an elevation of 3,173 feet (967 m).

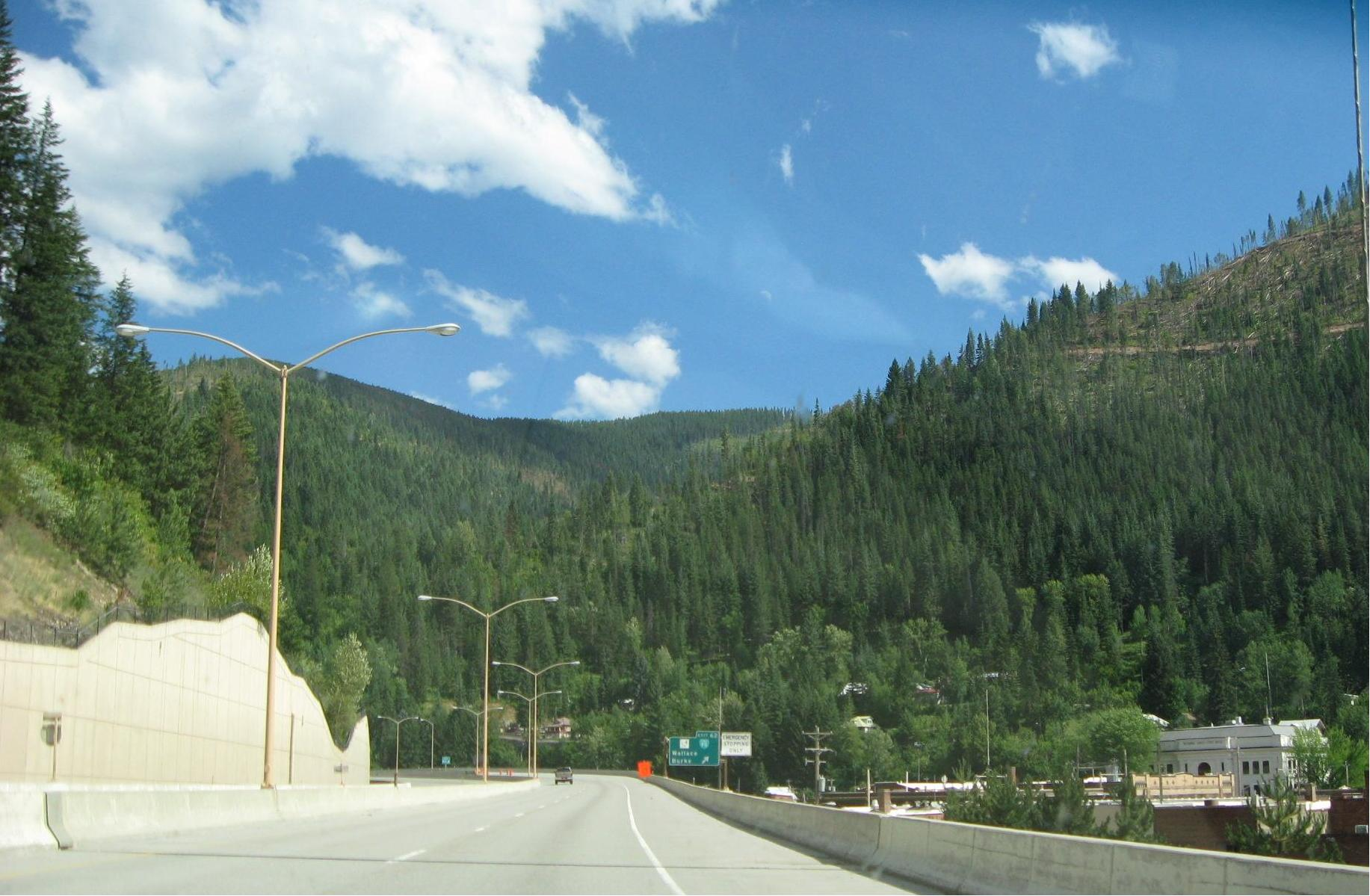
Eastbound I-90 on the 1991 viaduct at Wallace in 2007

From the summit, I-90 continues southeast along Fourth of July Canyon towards the Coeur d'Alene River valley and intersects SH-3 near Rose Lake. The freeway bends northward around a hill and travels east into the river valley, passing Cataldo and the Old Mission State Park, home to the state's oldest standing building. In Cataldo, it also crosses the river and the Trail of the Coeur d'Alenes, a major rail trail that follows the highway into the Bitterroot Range. I-90 crosses into Shoshone County, one of only two counties along the highway within Idaho, and continues along the north sides of Pinehurst and Smelterville, passing the Shoshone County Airport at the latter. The freeway travels southeasterly through Kellogg, passing the Silver Mountain Resort and its ski gondola, and continues around the towns of Osburn and Silverton along the north bank of the South Fork Coeur d'Alene River at the bottom of the narrow Silver Valley. I-90 also intersects a set of business routes in Osburn and Silverton that loop back to the freeway.

The freeway turns east in the town of Wallace, also served by its own business route, and travels to the north of downtown on an elevated viaduct cut into a nearby hill. At the east end of Wallace, I-90 intersects SH-4, which connects to the ghost town of Burke. The highway continues along the south side of the river and Trail of the Coeur d'Alenes as it ascends further into the mountains and meanders around hills and gulches. The trail ends at the town of Mullan, named for road-building U.S. Army captain John Mullan and home to a business route, and I-90 continues east along the Northern Pacific Trail. The freeway travels uphill from the river along a southern ridge and passes a scenic viewpoint commemorating the 1903 Willow Creek avalanche. I-90 then turns south and leaves Idaho at Lookout Pass, elevated 4,725 feet (1,440 m) above sea level and located adjacent to the Lookout Pass Ski and Recreation Area. The freeway continues into Montana and travels through the cities of Missoula, Butte, Bozeman, and Billings.

I-90 is the only Interstate in northern Idaho and a major east–west route, forming part of a transcontinental highway. At 74 miles (119 km), it is the second-shortest mainline Interstate in the state, after Interstate 86, and the third-longest. The entire highway was designated as the Purple Heart Trail by the state legislature in 2008. The Idaho section of I-90 is maintained by the Idaho Transportation Department (ITD), which conducts an annual survey of traffic on certain highway segments that is expressed in terms of average annual daily traffic (AADT), a measure of traffic volume for any average day of the year. Traffic volumes on I-90 ranged from a minimum of 7,861 near Mullan and 60,729 in Huetter on an average day in 2017.

== History ==
Interstate 90 from Coeur d'Alene to Lookout Pass roughly follows the route of the Mullan Road, constructed in 1859–60 by the U.S. Army and civilian volunteers led by captain John Mullan. Mullan received a series of appropriations from U.S. Congress from 1855 to 1860, totaling $230,000, to build the first engineered road west of the Mississippi River and connect Fort Walla Walla to Fort Benton on the Missouri River. The road through the Idaho Panhandle was constructed in 1859 and followed the Coeur d'Alene River and its south fork, which was long used by the Coeur d'Alene people to visit hunting grounds in modern-day Montana. The Mullan Road was designated as a National Historic Engineering Landmark in 1978 by the American Society of Civil Engineers.

The Idaho state government designated Route 2, the North Pacific Highway, between the Washington border and St. Regis Pass as part of its original numbered highway system in 1914. Other sections of I-90 were built over the Yellowstone Trail and U.S. Route 10, though some parts of I-90 were cut as new roadway. The link from Post Falls to the Washington state border was completed in 1972 at a cost of $1.1 million to upgrade the existing road and build a new bridge over the Spokane River.

The small town of Wallace in the Silver Valley still prides itself on having what was the last stoplight on I-90. Its downtown has many historical buildings, which would have been wiped out by the original planned route of the freeway, so in 1976, city leaders had the downtown placed on the National Register of Historic Places. Alternatives discussed in 1963 included tunnels and twin levels.

As a result, the federal government was forced at great expense to reroute the freeway to the northern edge of downtown and elevate it. Work on that section was resumed in 1984, and it opened in September 1991. A bicycle path is routed beneath part of that segment. Before the move to the viaduct, I-90 went from a freeway at the western edge of Wallace, then turned to surface streets and followed the main arterial as U.S. Route 10 through town, which included the last stoplight on I-90 between Seattle and Boston. Upon reaching the eastern edge of the town it became a limited access divided highway once again.

The interstate was routed along the shore of Lake Coeur d'Alene as a surface street until August 1992. The Veterans Memorial Centennial Bridge, which carries I-90 further above the lake and Bennett Bay, was dedicated on July 4, 1992. The westbound lanes of the 5.5-mile (8.9 km) section east of Coeur d'Alene were opened later that month and followed by the eastbound lanes on August 27. A portion of the former highway was converted into an extension of the Centennial Trail.

== Future plans ==
In 2022, ITD began studying reconstruction and expansion of the State Line–Coeur d'Alene section of I-90 to accommodate projected population growth and traffic congestion; by 2045, the section between SH-41 and northwestern Coeur d'Alene is expected to carry 137,000 daily vehicles. Under the conceptual plans, the freeway would be six to eight lanes wide with interchange and overpass reconstruction, as well as replacement of the Spokane River bridge. Two single-point urban interchanges would be constructed near Coeur d'Alene alongside a collector–distributor lane. The program is projected to cost $1.2 billion with funding not identified for most of the phases; a section between SH-41 and US-95 is funded and expected to begin construction in 2024 or later.

== Exit list ==
County	Location	mi	km	Exit	Destinations	Notes
Kootenai		0.000	0.000		I-90 west – Spokane	Continuation into Washington
Kootenai		0.000– 0.098	0.000– 0.158	Bridge over Spokane River		
Kootenai	Post Falls	1.160	1.867	1	Beck Road (via Pointe Parkway)	
Kootenai	Post Falls	2.080	3.347	2	Pleasant View Road	
Kootenai	Post Falls	4.632	7.454	5	I-90 BL east (Spokane Street) – City Center	Exit is just east of northernmost point on I-90
Kootenai	Post Falls	5.450	8.771	6	I-90 BL west (Seltice Way / 4th Avenue) – City Center	Westbound exit and eastbound entrance
Kootenai	Post Falls	7.128	11.471	7	SH-41 north – Rathdrum	
Kootenai	Coeur d'Alene	11.290	18.169	11	I-90 BL east (Northwest Boulevard) – City Center	
Kootenai	Coeur d'Alene	12.040	19.377	12	US 95 (Lincoln Way) – Sandpoint, Moscow, Silverwood, Canada	
Kootenai	Coeur d'Alene	12.560	20.213	13	4th Street	
Kootenai	Coeur d'Alene	13.560	21.823	14	15th Street	
Kootenai	Coeur d'Alene	14.780	23.786	15	I-90 BL west (Sherman Avenue) – City Center	
Kootenai		16.882	27.169	17	Mullan Trail Road	
Kootenai		22.063	35.507	22	SH-97 south – Harrison, St. Maries	
Kootenai		28.380	45.673	28	Fourth of July Pass Recreation Area	
Kootenai		34.028	54.763	34	SH-3 south – Rose Lake, St. Maries, Harrison	
Kootenai		39.024	62.803	39	Old Mission State Park	
Kootenai		40.096	64.528	40	Cataldo	
Shoshone	Kingston	43.016	69.228	43	FR 9 – Kingston, Thompson Pass	
Shoshone		45.261	72.841	45	Pinehurst, Smelterville	
Shoshone		47.687	76.745	48	Smelterville, Shoshone County Airport	
Shoshone	Kellogg	49.715	80.009	49	Bunker Avenue – Silver Mountain	
Shoshone	Kellogg	50.321	80.984	50	Hill Street	Eastbound exit and westbound entrance
Shoshone	Kellogg	50.551	81.354	51	Division Street – Wardner	No westbound entrance
Shoshone		54.186	87.204	54	Big Creek	
Shoshone	Osburn	57.036	91.791	57	I-90 BS east – Osburn	
Shoshone		59.553	95.841	60	I-90 BS west – Silverton, Osburn	
Shoshone	Wallace	60.990	98.154	61	I-90 BL east (The Harry F. Magnuson Way) – Wallace	
Shoshone	Wallace	61.948	99.696	62	I-90 BL west (Bank Street / The Harry F. Magnuson Way) / SH-4 east (Burke Road) – Wallace, Burke	
Shoshone		64.270	103.433	64	Golconda District	
Shoshone		65.352	105.174	65	Compressor District	
Shoshone		66.500	107.021	66	Gold Creek	Eastbound exit and entrance
Shoshone		67.353	108.394	67	Morning District, West Mullan	
Shoshone	Mullan	68.100	109.596	68	I-90 BL east – Mullan	Eastbound exit and westbound entrance
Shoshone		68.908	110.897	69	I-90 BL west – Mullan, East Mullan	
Shoshone		73.888	118.911		I-90 east (Lookout Pass) – Missoula	Continuation into Montana
1.000 mi = 1.609 km; 1.000 km = 0.621 mi: Incomplete access

== Related routes ==
- Business routes of Interstate 90 § Idaho
- U.S. Route 10

Interstate 90
Previous state: Washington	Idaho	Next state: Montana
