= Trail of the Coeur d'Alenes =

Rail trail in Idaho, US

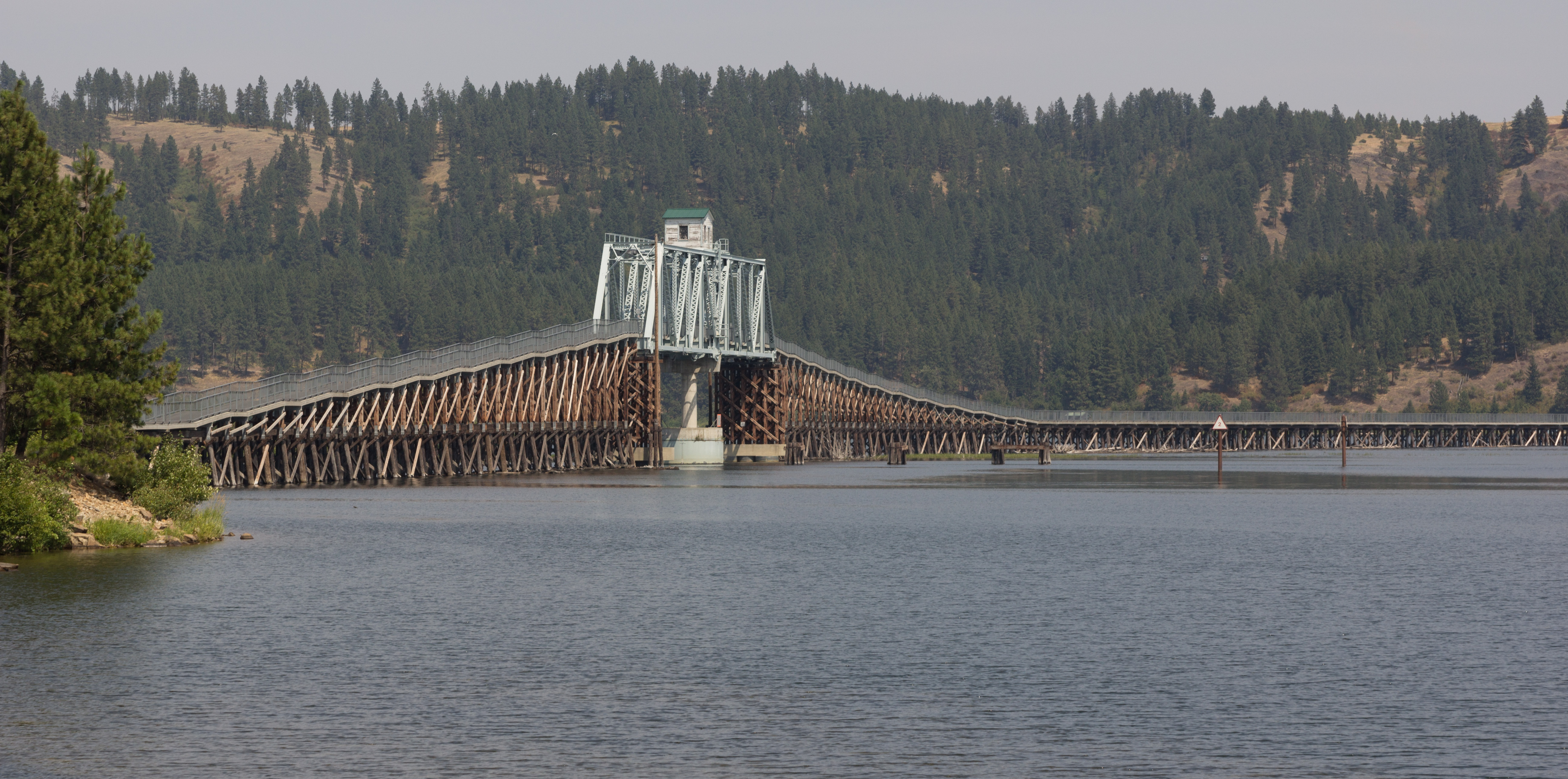
- Crossing Lake Coeur d'Alene on the Chatcolet Bridge, a long wooden trestle bridge with a 1921-built, former-swing-span truss bridge section
- Length: 73 miles (117 km)
- Location: Northern Idaho, U.S.
- Established: March 2004
- Designation: Idaho state park
- Trailheads: Mullan (east); Plummer (west)47°30′35″N 116°32′13″W
- Use: Biking, inline skating, hiking
- Highest point: 3,280 ft (1,000 m) (Mullan)
- Lowest point: 2,200 ft (670 m) (Harrison)
- Difficulty: Easy
- Season: Year-round
- Sights: Silver Valley, Lake Coeur d'Alene, Heyburn State Park, Palouse
- Surface: Asphalt
- Maintainer: Idaho Department of Parks and Recreation
- Website: Trail of the Coeur d'Alenes

The Trail of the Coeur d'Alenes is a rail trail in the Idaho Panhandle of the United States. It follows the right-of-way of the former Union Pacific Railroad from Mullan, a mountain mining town near the Montana border, westward to Plummer, a town on the prairie near the Washington border. Generally following the Coeur d'Alene River, the rail line was abandoned in 1991, and the trail officially opened in March 2004.

== Trail route ==
The trail's 73-mile (117 km) route winds through the mountainous terrain of historic Silver Valley in northern Idaho. It begins in Plummer and travels east into the chain lakes region, along the shore of Lake Coeur d'Alene, over the Chatcolet Bridge to Heyburn State Park, and concludes with a climb to the northern Palouse prairie. The route passes through 20 trailheads.

Trail users can continue along a bike path in Washington that leads to Spokane. The eastern half of the trail in Shoshone County has Interstate 90 nearby. In Kootenai County, I-90 leaves the river to head over Fourth of July Summit to the lake's north shore and the city of Coeur d'Alene, while the river and trail descends southwest toward Harrison, closer to State Highway 3.

Location of trailheads in Idaho

== Environmental impact ==
The trail is not only a recreational facility, but also a solution to environmental problems left behind by Idaho's mining industry. Silver, lead, and zinc were discovered in the valley around 1884, and a rail line was built to access the mines around 1888. Much of the rock in the railbed was either waste rock from mines, or tailings containing heavy metals. The railbed was also contaminated with spillage from passing trains.

To remedy these environmental problems, the Union Pacific Railroad, U.S. government, the State of Idaho, and the Coeur d'Alene Tribe partnered to build a trail. The thick asphalt and the gravel barriers on the sides of the trail serve as a permanent cap to isolate contaminants from the surrounding environment. A portion of the trail is within the Coeur d'Alene Reservation, and an approximately 15-mile (24 km) section of the trail is managed by the Tribe. (Note: For the full story of the Trail of the Coeur d'Alenes, resulting from negotiations of the U.S. EPA and other parties to resolve the Superfund liability of Union Pacific Railroad, see Cleaning Up At the Tracks: Superfund Meets Rails-To-Trails, Clifford J. Villa (2001).)

== Recreational features ==
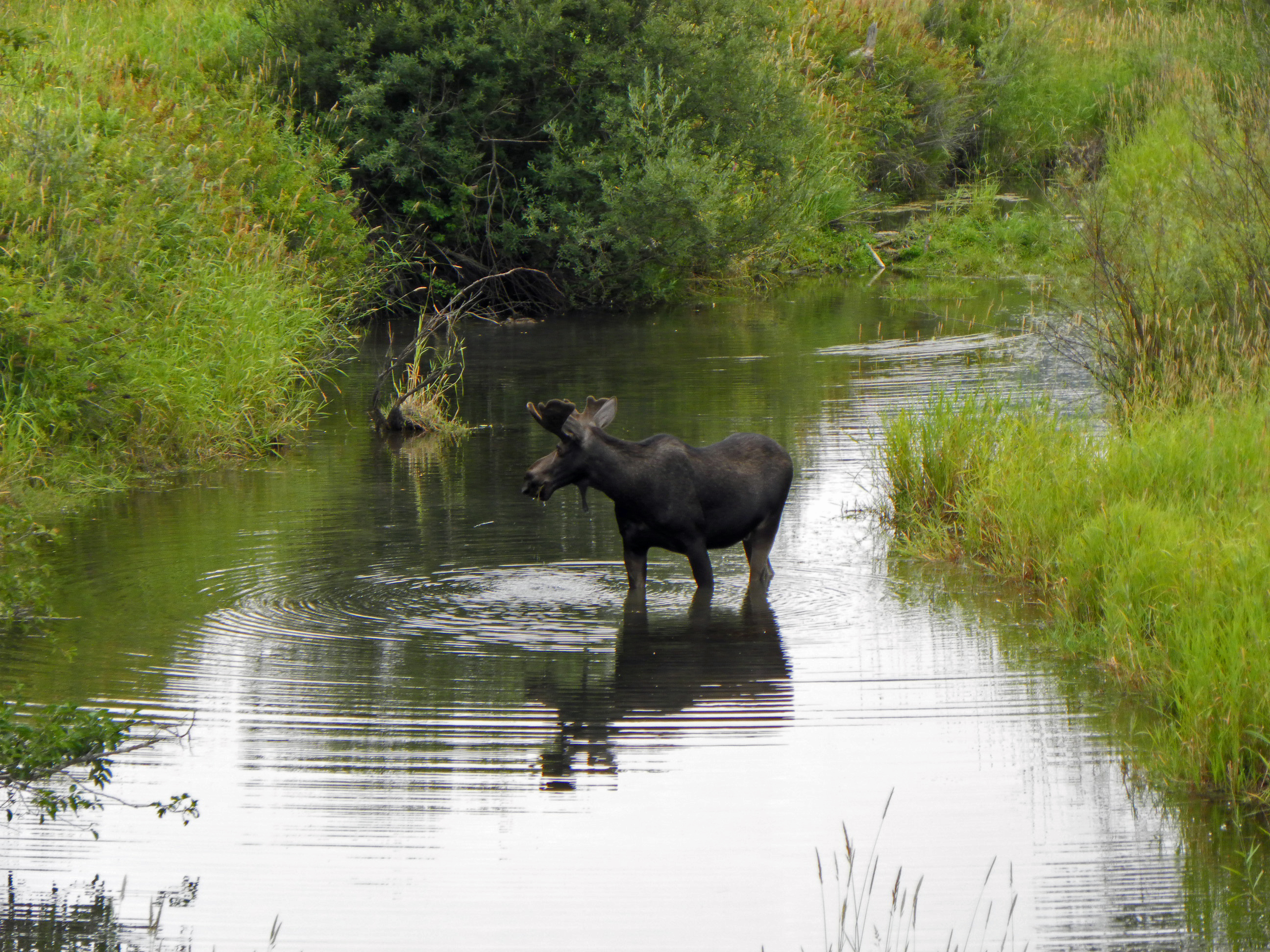
A moose seen from the trail

The Trail of the Coeur d'Alenes includes camping facilities and rest areas regularly. The trail leads through protected marsh lands, offering the cyclist a glimpse of eagle and osprey nests, moose, elk, and a variety of ducks and other wildlife, as well as some rare species of wildflowers and accompanying butterflies as a result of the age-old soot from the old railroad.

== See also ==
- Route of the Hiawatha Trail
- List of Idaho state parks
- National Parks in Idaho
