= Lane, Idaho =

Unincorporated community in the state of Idaho, United States

- Unincorporated community
- Location within Idaho Location within the United States
- Coordinates: 47°30′25″N 116°32′11″W
- Country: United States
- State: Idaho
- County: Kootenai
- Elevation: 2,169 ft (661 m)
- Time zone: UTC-8 (Pacific (PST))
  - Summer (DST): UTC-7 (PDT)
- Area codes: 208, 986
- GNIS feature ID: 399113

Lane is an unincorporated community in Kootenai County, Idaho, United States. Lane is located along the Coeur d'Alene River and Idaho State Highway 3. It is 12 miles (19 km) northeast of Harrison. The community was founded as a lumber town in the 1880s and named after a logger.

== History ==
Lane's population was estimated at 200 in 1909.
