= Cataldo, Idaho =

Unincorporated community in the state of Idaho, United States

- Unincorporated Community
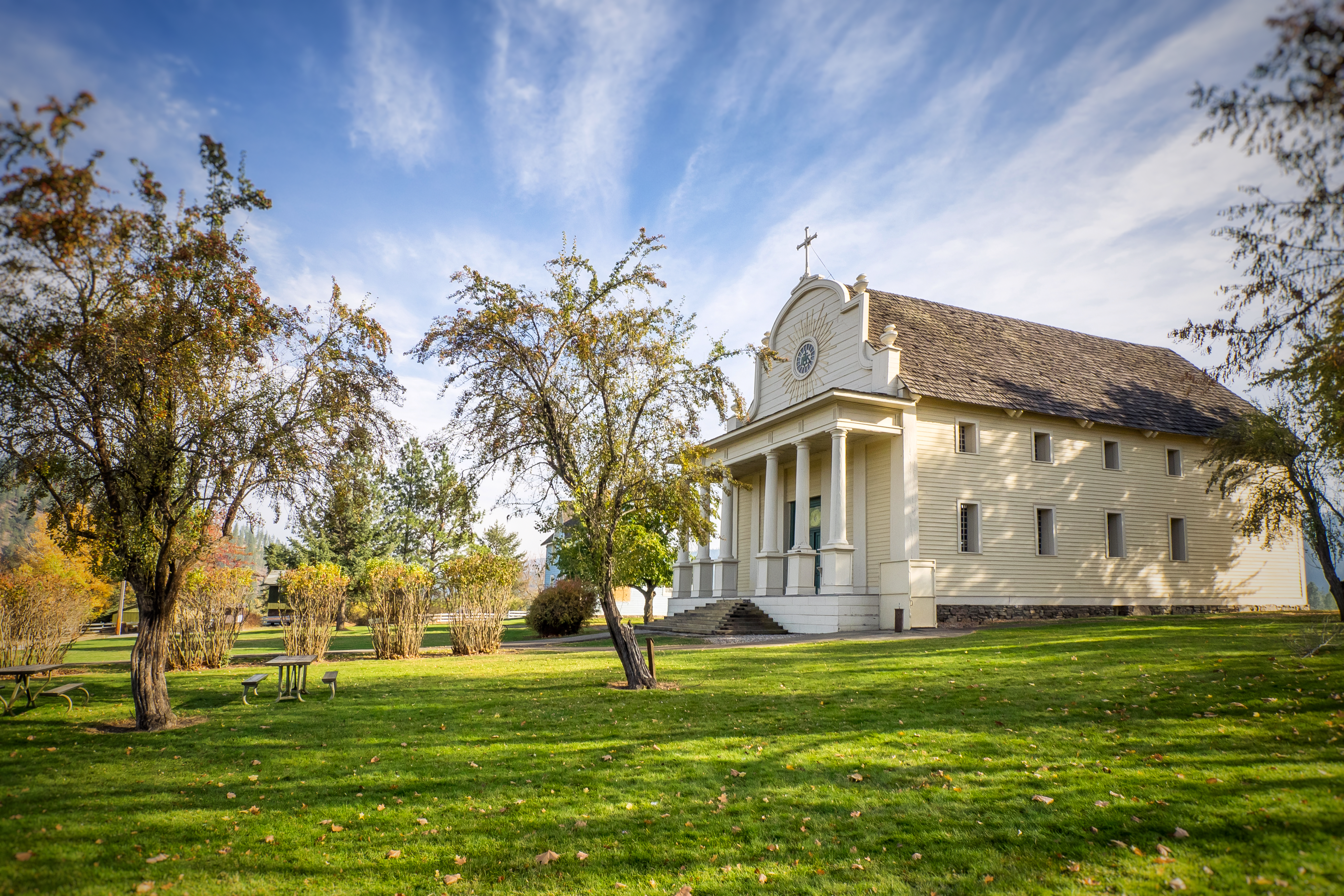
- Cataldo Mission in 2015
- Interactive map of Cataldo, Idaho
- Coordinates: 47°32′56″N 116°19′47″W
- Country: United States
- State: Idaho
- County: Kootenai and Shoshone
- Elevation: 2,139 ft (652 m)
- Time zone: UTC-8 (PST)
  - Summer (DST): UTC-7 (PDT)
- ZIP Code: 83810
- Area Code: 208 and 986
- GNIS feature ID: 396248

Cataldo is an unincorporated community in the northwest United States, located in Kootenai and Shoshone counties in northern Idaho. Cataldo lies on the southeast banks of the Coeur d'Alene River and Interstate 90 passes the south side of the community. The community of Kingston lies along I-90 to the east. Named for Father Joseph Cataldo (1837–1928), a noted Jesuit priest of the region, its ZIP Code is 83810.

== History ==
The nearby area was the site of the Cataldo Mission, which lies west of the river in Kootenai County. Established by the Jesuits and a National Historic Landmark, it is the site of the oldest building in Idaho.

Cataldo's population was estimated at 100 in 1909 and was also 100 in 1960.
