= Jay Rand Sanburn =

Politician in Idaho, USA (1833–1919)

Jay Rand Sanburn (1833–1919) was an Idaho politician who was elected to the Idaho House of Representatives from Kootenai County and Shoshone County for a term in 1898.

Sanburn was a businessman who was engaged in a variety of different industries. He assembled a large collection of minerals and other curiosities after retiring from the Legislature, which was purchased in 1901 by the University of Idaho. Sanburn is thought to have originated the song "Sanburn Slottiche". He was buried in Coeur d'Alene.
