= List of exits on Interstate 90 =

The Interstate 90 exit list has been divided by state:

- Interstate 90 in Washington#Exit list
- Interstate 90 in Idaho#Exit list
- Interstate 90 in Montana#Exit list
- Interstate 90 in Wyoming#Exit list
- Interstate 90 in South Dakota#Exit list
- Interstate 90 in Minnesota#Exit list
- Interstate 90 in Wisconsin#Exit list
- Interstate 90 in Illinois#Exit list
- Interstate 90 in Indiana#Exit list
- Interstate 90 in Ohio#Exit list
- Interstate 90 in Pennsylvania#Exit list
- Interstate 90 in New York#Exit list
- Interstate 90 in Massachusetts#Exit list
