= Harrison Commercial Historic District =

Historic district in Idaho, United States

- U.S. National Register of Historic Places
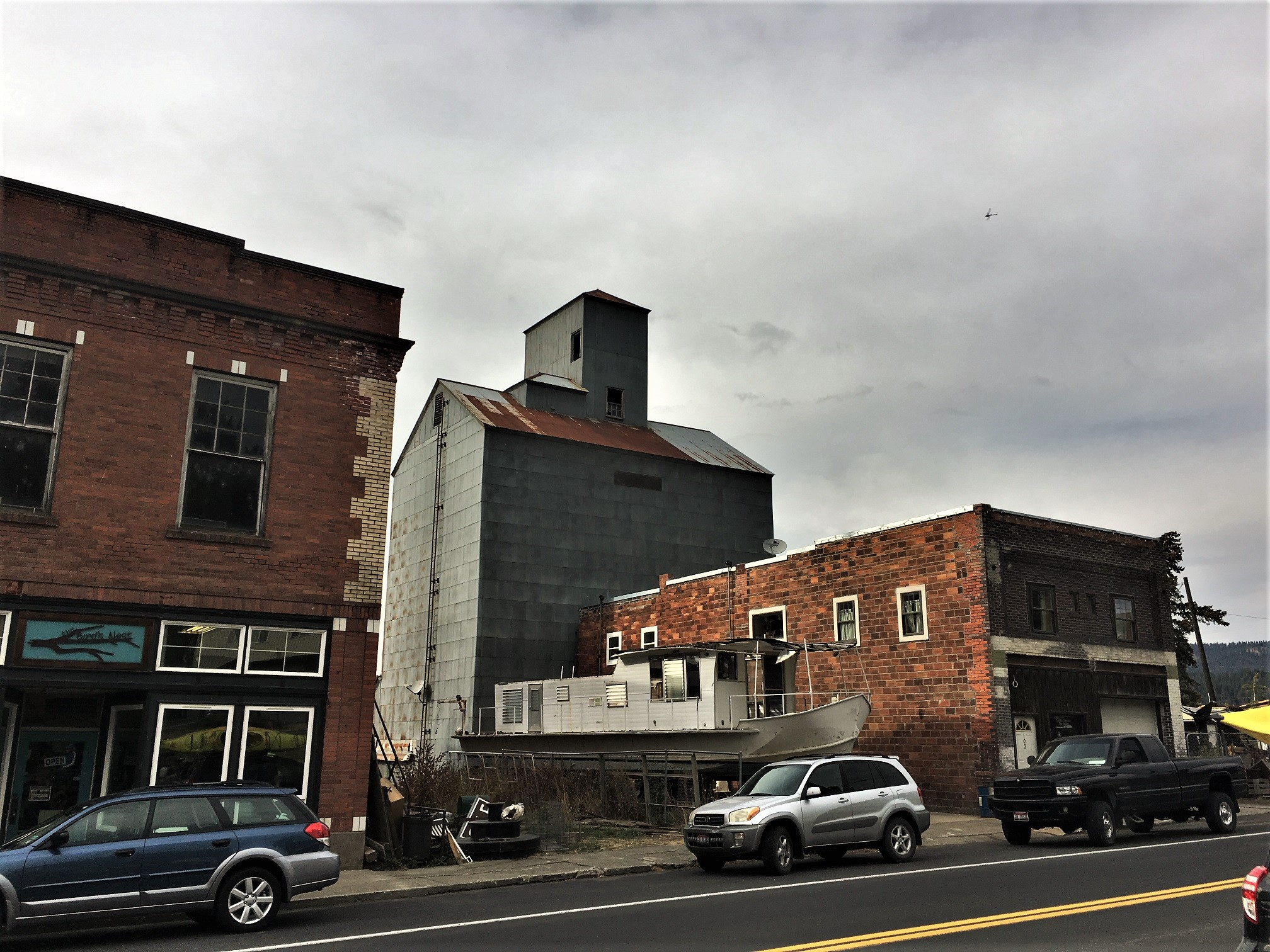
- Masonic Temple at left; Theatre/Armstrong Garage at right; E.C. Hayes and Sons grain elevator in center background

- Location within Idaho
- Location: Roughly bounded by N. Lake Ave., W. Harrison St., N. Coeur d'Alene Ave., and Pine St., Harrison, Idaho
- Coordinates: 47°27′15″N 116°47′06″W
- Area: 2.5 acres (1.0 ha)
- Built: 1917
- NRHP reference No.: 96001505
- Added to NRHP: December 20, 1996

The Harrison Commercial Historic District, in Harrison, Idaho, is a historic district which was listed on the National Register of Historic Places in 1996. The listing included six contributing buildings.

The commercial district of Harrison was mostly destroyed in a fire in 1917. Some businessmen rebuilt in fireproof construction. The historic district includes most of the rebuilt area including six brick buildings dating from 1917 or shortly thereafter, and a metal grain elevator built in 1955 which is the only non-contributing structure in the district. It also includes a non-rebuilt city block which is a city park.

It includes, on the east side of Coeur D'Alene Ave.:

- Bridgeman Building
- Corskie Building
- Marier and Brass/Paulsen building

And it includes, from south to north along west side of Coeur D'Alene Ave. (Idaho State Highway 97):

- I.O.O.F. Building
- City park
- Masonic Temple
- E.C. Hayes and Sons grain elevator
- Theatre/Armstrong Garage

== Gallery ==
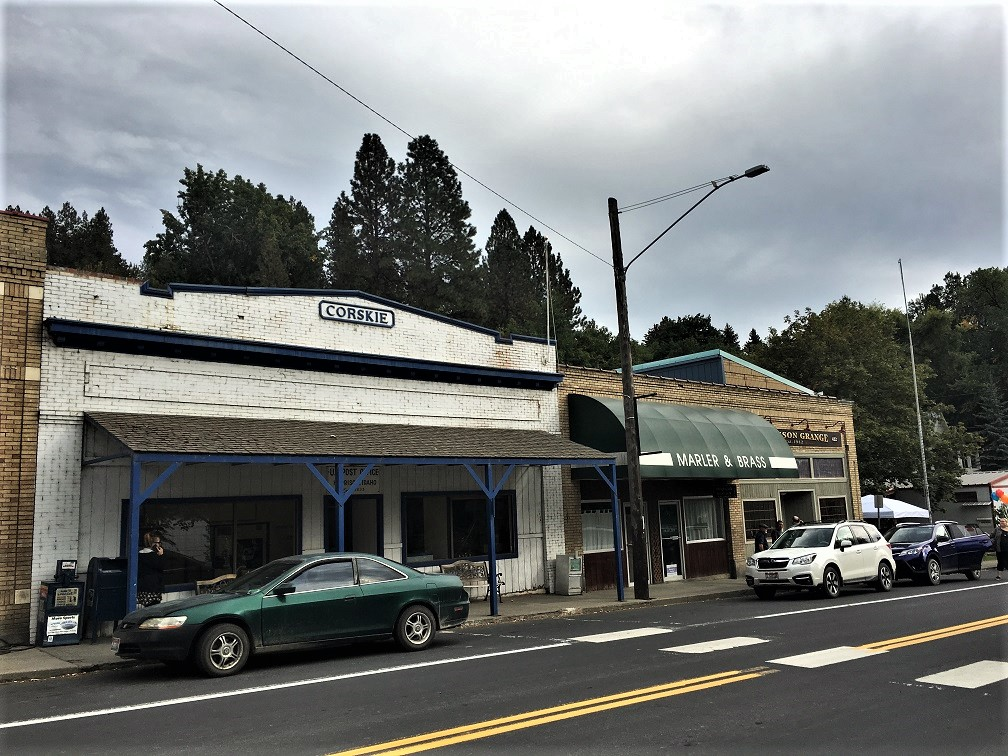
Corskie Building at left, Marier and Brass/Paulsen building at right. Edge of Bridgeman Building at very left.

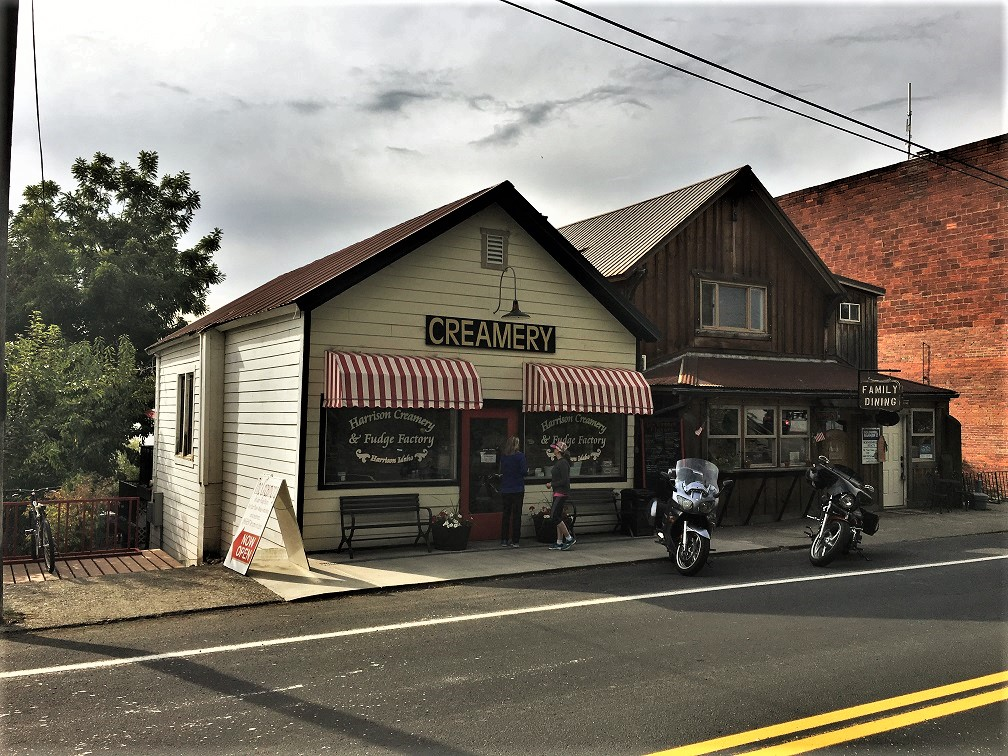
South wall of I.O.O.F. Building, at right; the former post office, at left, the sole structure surviving the 1917 fire (not included in historic district).

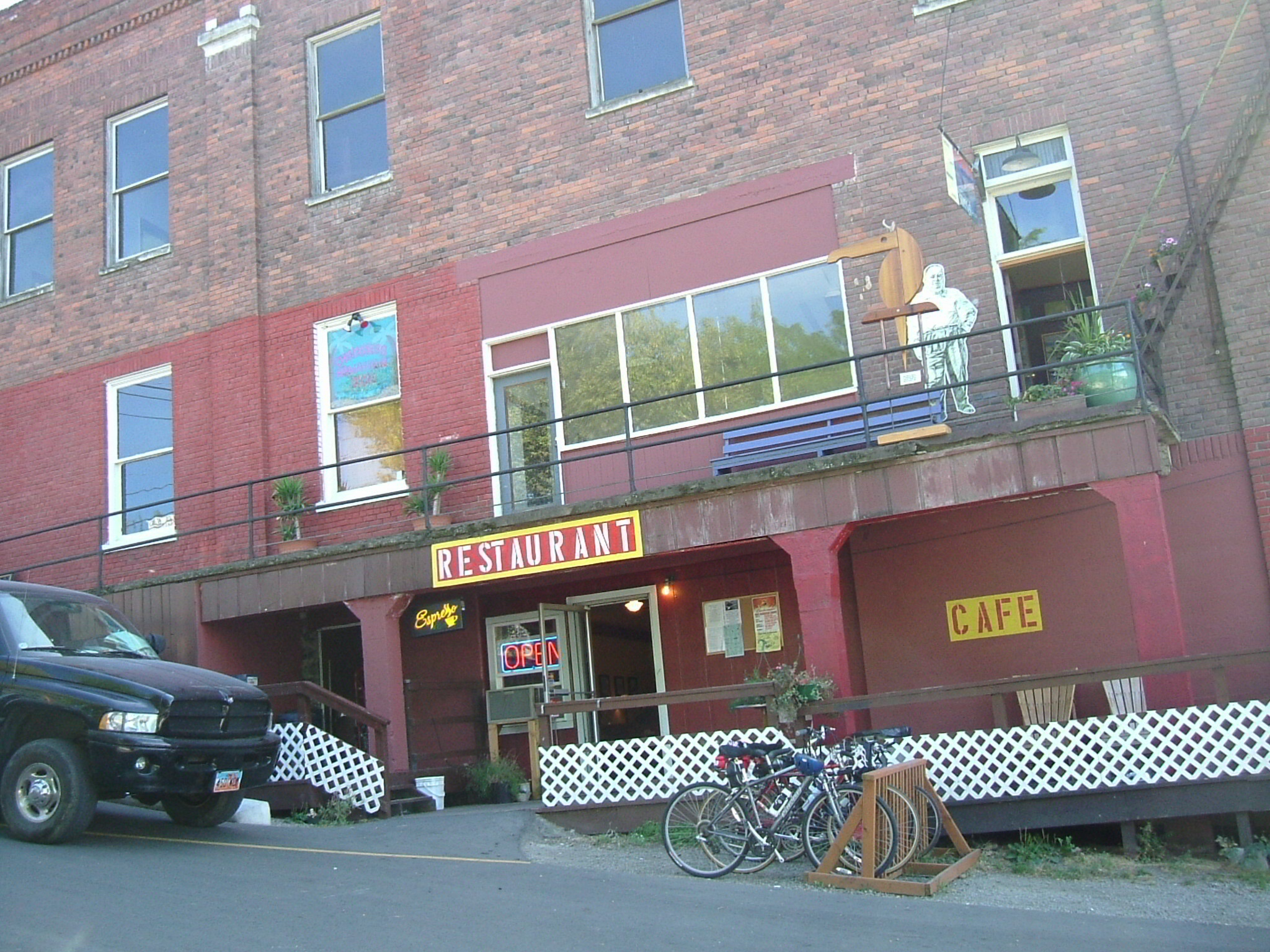
North side of I.O.O.F. Building, facing the park.
