= Idaho State Highway 97 =

State highway in Kootenai County, Idaho

State Highway 97
- Lake Coeur d'Alene Scenic Byway
- SH-97 highlighted in red

Route information
- Maintained by ITD
- Length: 35.745 mi (57.526 km)

Major junctions
- South end: SH-3 near Harrison
- North end: I-90 near Coeur d'Alene

Location
- Country: United States
- State: Idaho
- Counties: Kootenai

Highway system
- Idaho State Highway System; Interstate; US; State
← US 95	→ SH-99

State Highway 97 (SH-97) is a state highway in Kootenai County, Idaho. The highway runs for 35.745 miles (57.526 km) from State Highway 3 to Interstate 90 (I-90) along the east side of Lake Coeur d'Alene, passing through the community of Harrison. The entire highway is designated as the Lake Coeur d'Alene Scenic Byway.

== Route description ==
State Highway 97 begins at a Y intersection with State Highway 3, part of the White Pine Scenic Byway, in an unincorporated area within the Coeur d'Alene Reservation north of Parkline. The highway travels northwest through the reservation, passing Kootenai Junior/Senior High School, towards Harrison on the shores of Lake Coeur d'Alene. SH-97 turns northeastward within Harrison and leaves the reservation by crossing over the Coeur d'Alene River. The highway continues north along the shore of Lake Coeur d'Alene at the foot of hills that form part of the Coeur d'Alene National Forest. SH-97 ends at a diamond interchange with Interstate 90 at the east end of Wolf Lodge Bay.

== History ==
The route along the east side of Lake Coeur d'Alene was formerly part of U.S. Route 95 Alternate, which was designated until 1977.

== Major intersections ==
The entire route is in Kootenai County.

Location	mi	km	Destinations	Notes
	0.000	0.000	SH-3 to I-90 – Coeur d'Alene, St. Maries	Southern end.
	35.745	57.526	I-90 – Coeur d'Alene, Kellogg, Missoula	I-90 exit 22; northern end.
1.000 mi = 1.609 km; 1.000 km = 0.621 mi
