= Fourth of July Summit =

- Location within the United States Location within Idaho
- Elevation: 3,081 ft (939 m)
- Traversed by: I-90

Third Approach
- Location: Kootenai County, Idaho, U.S.
- Range: Coeur d'Alene Mountains, Bitterroot Range, Rocky Mountains
- Coordinates: 47.622°N 116.524°W

Fourth of July Summit is a mountain pass in the Rocky Mountains of the northwestern United States, located in northern Idaho. Its elevation is 3,081 feet (939 m) above sea level on Interstate 90 in central Kootenai County, east of the city of Coeur d'Alene.

The summit marks the western end of the Silver Valley mining district, which extends east, along the Coeur d'Alene River and Interstate 90 into Shoshone County to Lookout Pass on the Montana border.

== History ==
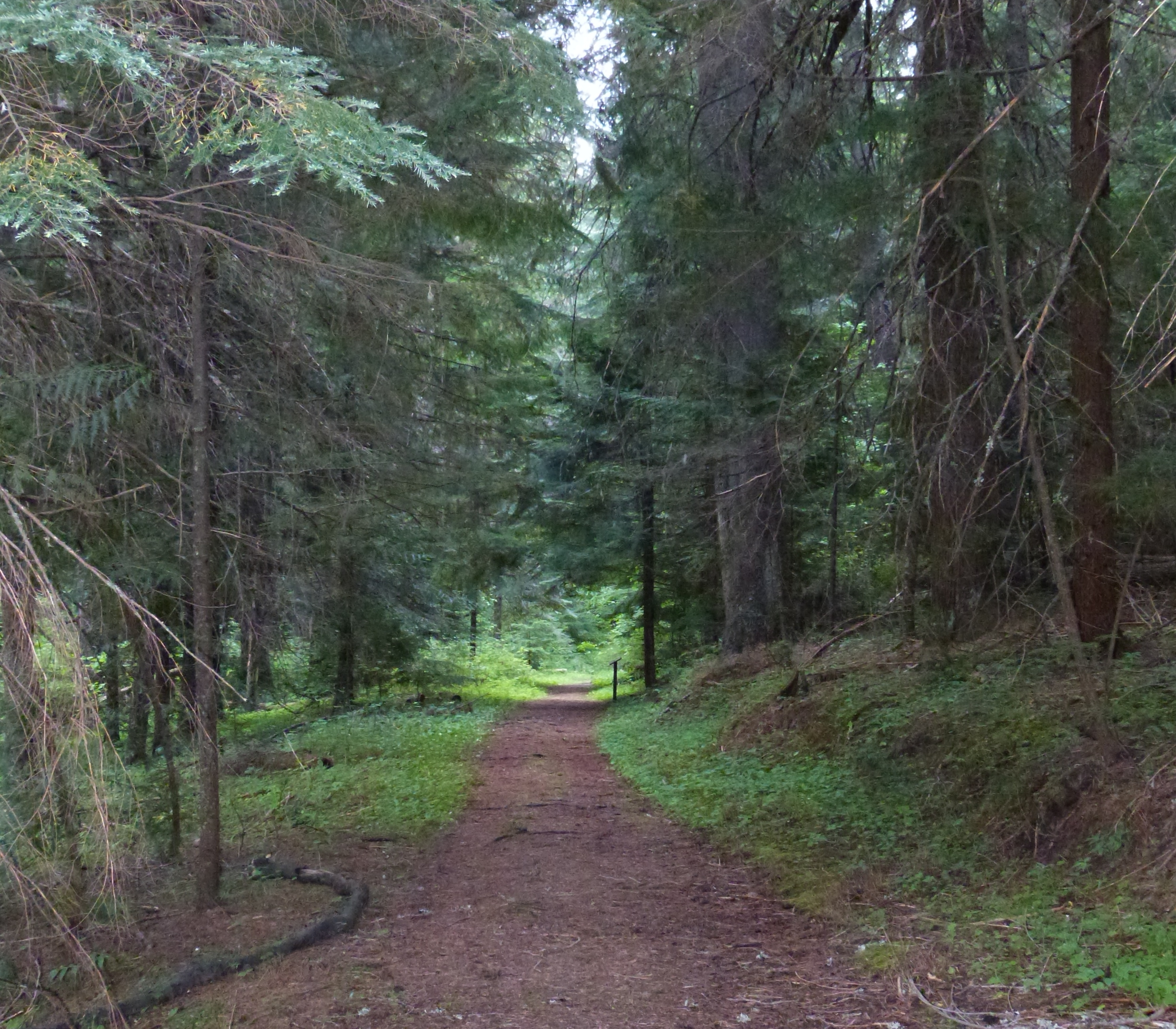
A portion of the Mullan Road over the pass that is listed on the National Register of Historic Places

Captain Mullan and his crew celebrated the 4th of July 1861 on top of this mountain as they took a break from clearing passage for the road they were building over it. Thus the current name of "4th of July pass" today.

The Mullan Road was the first wagon road to cross the Rocky Mountains to the Inland of the Pacific Northwest. It was built by U.S. Army Captain John Mullan between the spring of 1859 and summer 1862. It led from Fort Benton, Montana, to Fort Walla Walla, Washington Territory, and it roughly follows the path of modern-day Interstate-90 through the Rockies.

Mullan Road was designated a historic site by the National Register of Historical Places in 1975, and the American Society of Civil Engineers designated it a historic civil engineering landmark in 1977.
