= Joseph Cataldo =

Italian-American Jesuit priest and missionary (1837–1928)

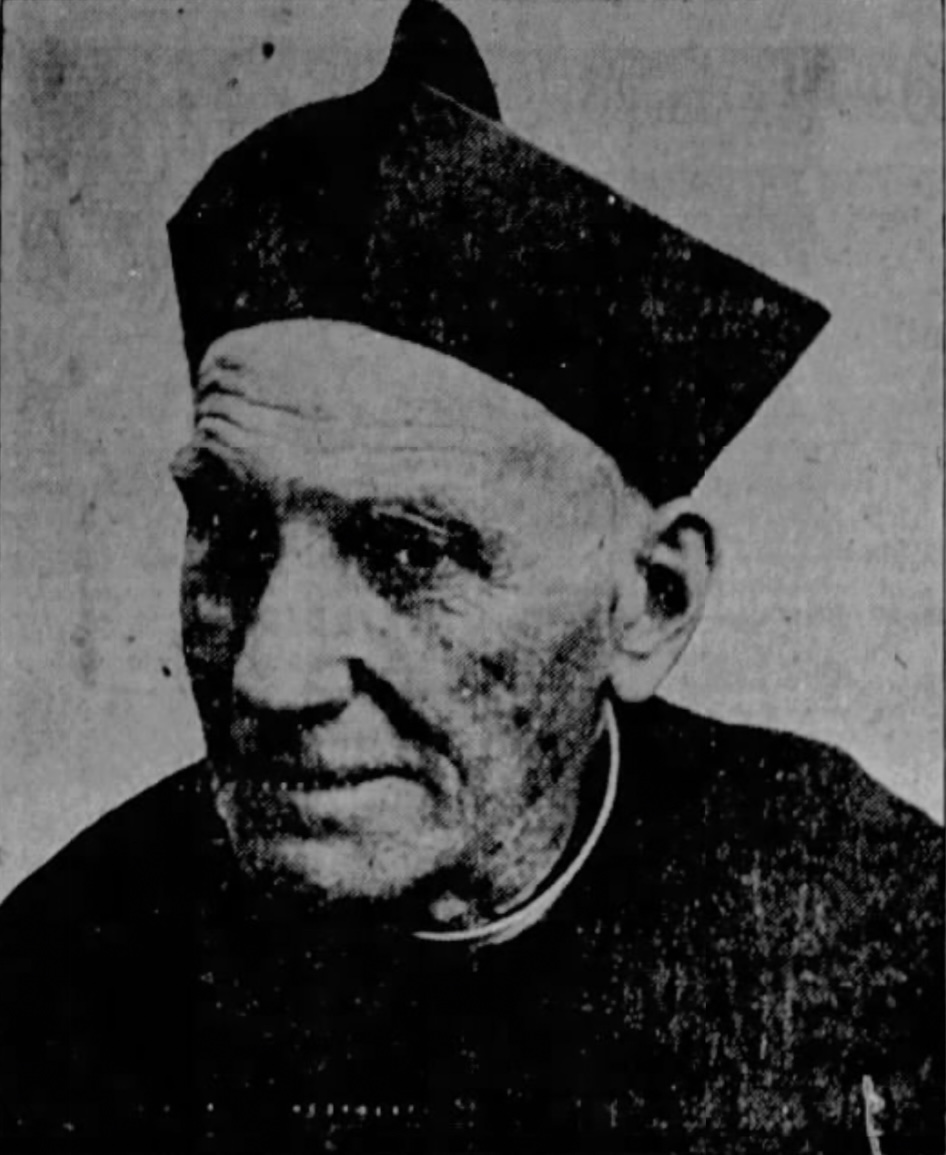
Joseph Cataldo c. 1928

Joseph Mary Cataldo (March 17, 1837 – April 9, 1928) was an Italian-American Jesuit priest, a pioneer missionary in the inland Pacific Northwest, who also founded Gonzaga University in Spokane, Washington.

Born in 1837 in Terrasini in the Kingdom of Two Sicilies, Cataldo was admitted to the Jesuit novitiate in Palermo, Sicily on December 22, 1852. After ordination, he was sent to the foreign mission in the Rocky Mountains in the United States. Due to ill health, Cataldo was then sent to Panama and later to Santa Clara College in Santa Clara, California. After his recovery he was sent north to the Spokane Indians. He later was superior of the Rocky Mountain mission which included the Spokane.

Cataldo then opened a small schoolhouse at Saint Michael's Mission where both Native American and white students attended. In order to expand the mission, he was able to purchase two parcels of land totalling 320 acres (1.3 km^{2}) for $936. The first parcel of 280 acres (1.1 km^{2}) north of Spokane was to be used for the relocation of St. Michael's mission. This location became the site for the Jesuit scholasticate Mount Saint Michael. The second parcel of 40 acres (16 ha) was located on the Spokane Falls, near modern downtown Spokane on the Spokane River. In 1881, Cataldo was encouraged to use the second parcel of land for the establishment of a college for the growing Catholic population in the area, and he established Gonzaga College there, now Gonzaga University.

Cataldo never retired; into his 90s he served the Nez Perce people at Slickpoo near Kamiah, Idaho. He died at age 92 at the Umatilla Indian Reservation, east of Pendleton, Oregon, on April 9, 1928. The community of Cataldo, along Interstate 90 in northern Idaho, was named for him, near the Jesuit mission which also informally does.
