= Prichard, Idaho =

Unincorporated community in the state of Idaho, United States

Coordinates: 47°39′23″N 115°58′35″W

Prichard is an unincorporated community in Shoshone County, Idaho, United States.

== History ==
A post office called Prichard was established in 1910, and remained in operation until 1943. The community derived its name from Andrew J. Prichard, a gold prospector.
