= Veterans Memorial Centennial Bridge =

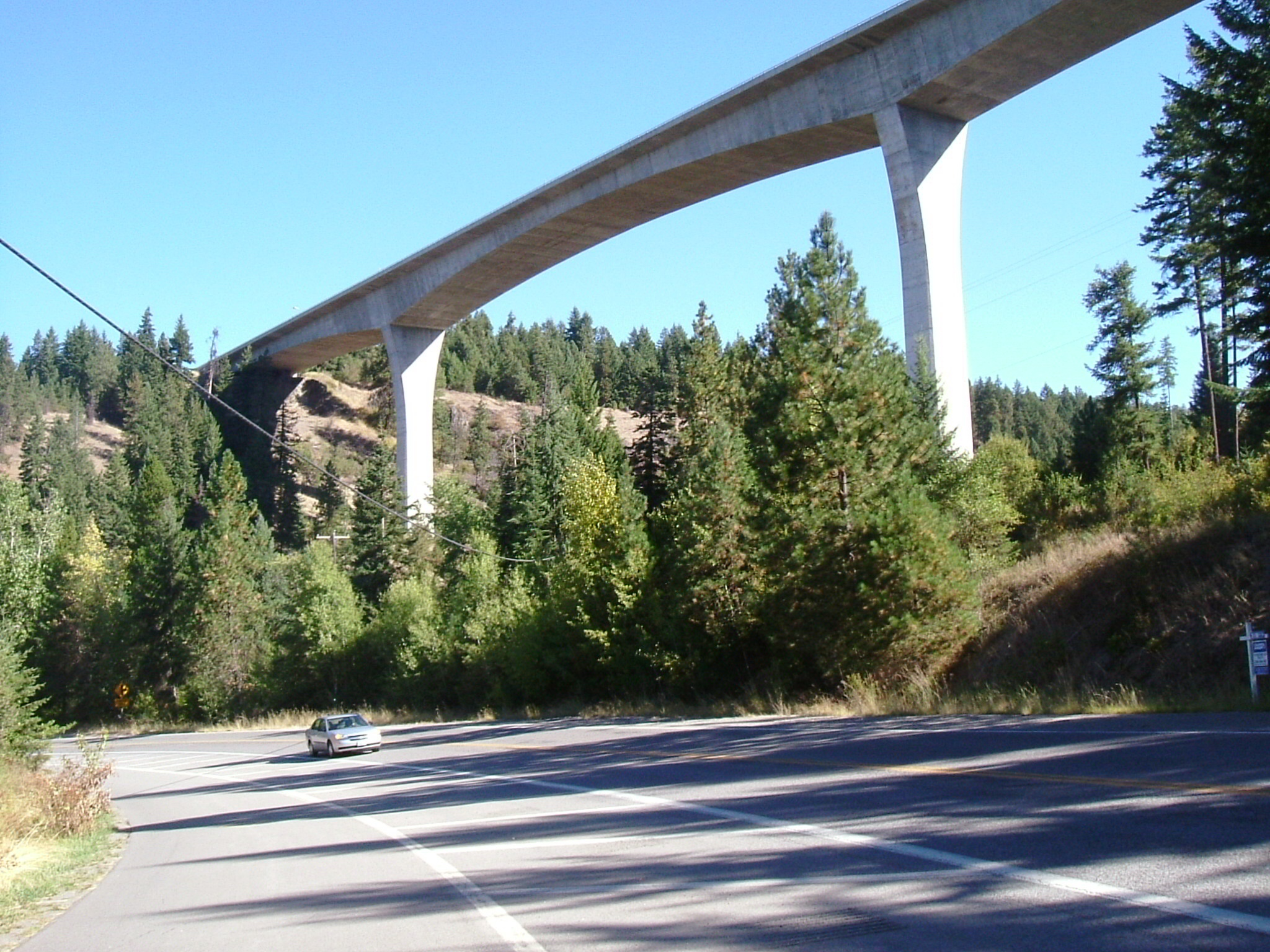
- View of the bridge from East Coeur d'Alene Lake Drive, looking from the west.
- Coordinates: 47°38′51″N 116°42′52″W
- Carries: I-90
- Crosses: Bennett Bay
- Locale: Coeur d'Alene, Idaho
- Other name(s): Bennett Bay Centennial Bridge
- Maintained by: Idaho Transportation Department

Characteristics
- Design: Box girder bridge
- Total length: 1,729 ft (527 m)
- Width: 70 ft (21 m)
- Height: 299 ft (91 m)
- No. of lanes: 4 (2 per direction)

History
- Construction end: 1991
- Construction cost: $16 million
- Opened: 1992

The Veterans Memorial Centennial Bridge (formerly known as the Bennett Bay Centennial Bridge) is a freeway bridge in Idaho. The bridge carries Interstate 90 over a valley above Bennett Bay, an arm of Lake Coeur d'Alene.

Construction of the bridge began in 1988 and used a balanced cantilever to build sections at an average rate of 16 feet (4.9 m) a week. It was completed in 1991 and opened the following year as part of the last major project to complete Interstate 90 east of Coeur d'Alene, at a cost of $16 million.

The bridge was initially named the Bennett Bay Centennial Bridge, to commemorate the centennial of Idaho, despite a long-standing state policy against adopting official bridge names. In 1992, the bridge was renamed the Veterans Memorial Centennial Bridge, in honor of Idaho's military veterans.

The bridge is a segmental concrete box girder bridge; it is 1,730 ft (530 m) long, 70 ft (21 m) wide, and carries four traffic lanes 300 ft (91 m) above the valley floor. It was designed by HNTB.
