= Old Mission State Park =

State park in Idaho, United States

Coeur d'Alene's Old Mission State Park
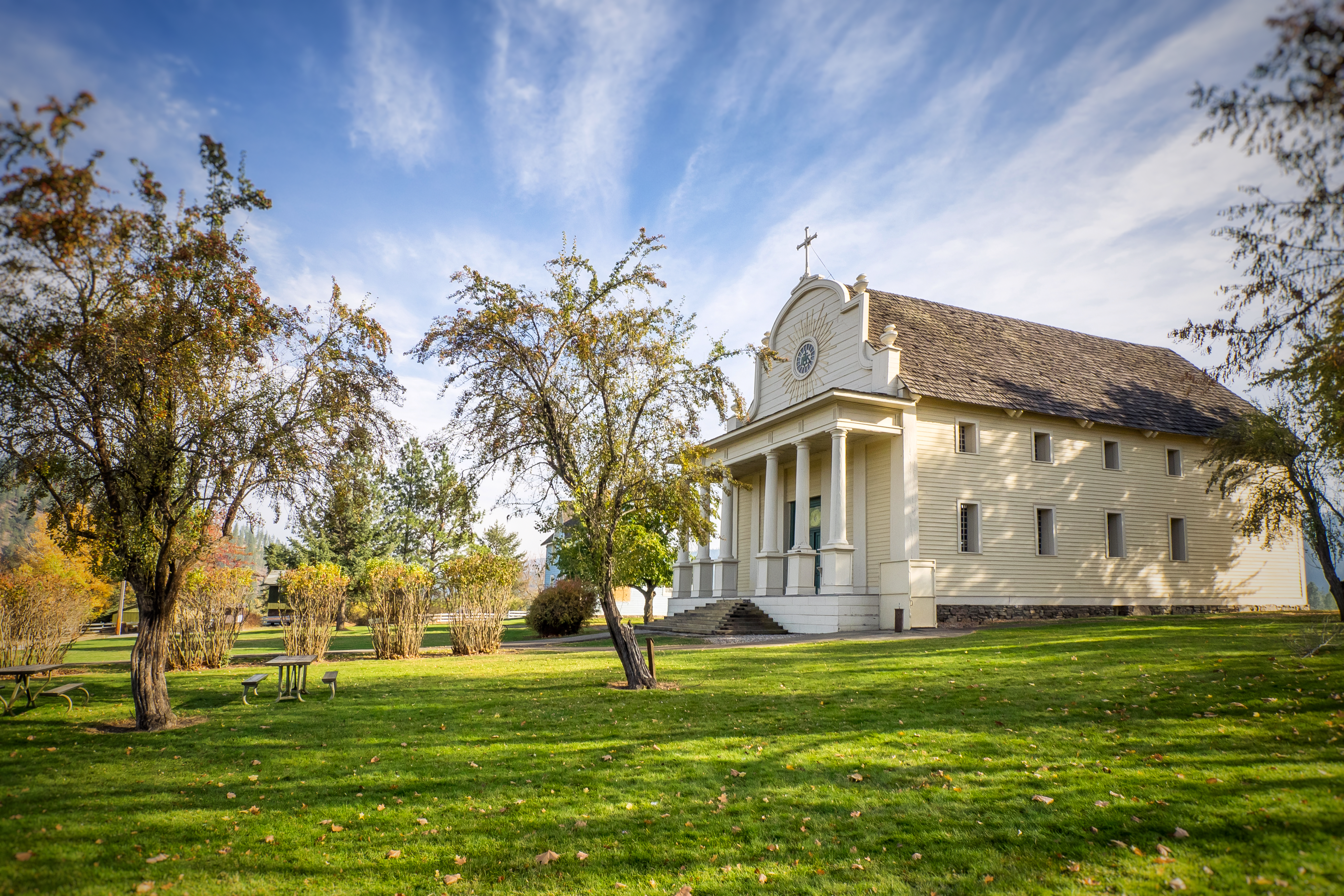
- The Sacred Heart Church

- Location within Idaho Location within the United States
- Location: Cataldo, Idaho, United States
- Nearest city: Coeur d'Alene, Idaho
- Coordinates: 47°32′55″N 116°21′30″W
- Area: 18 acres (7.3 ha)
- Elevation: 2,139 ft (652 m)
- Established: 1975
- Administrator: Idaho Department of Parks and Recreation
- Website: Official website
- Cataldo Mission
- U.S. National Register of Historic Places
- U.S. National Historic Landmark
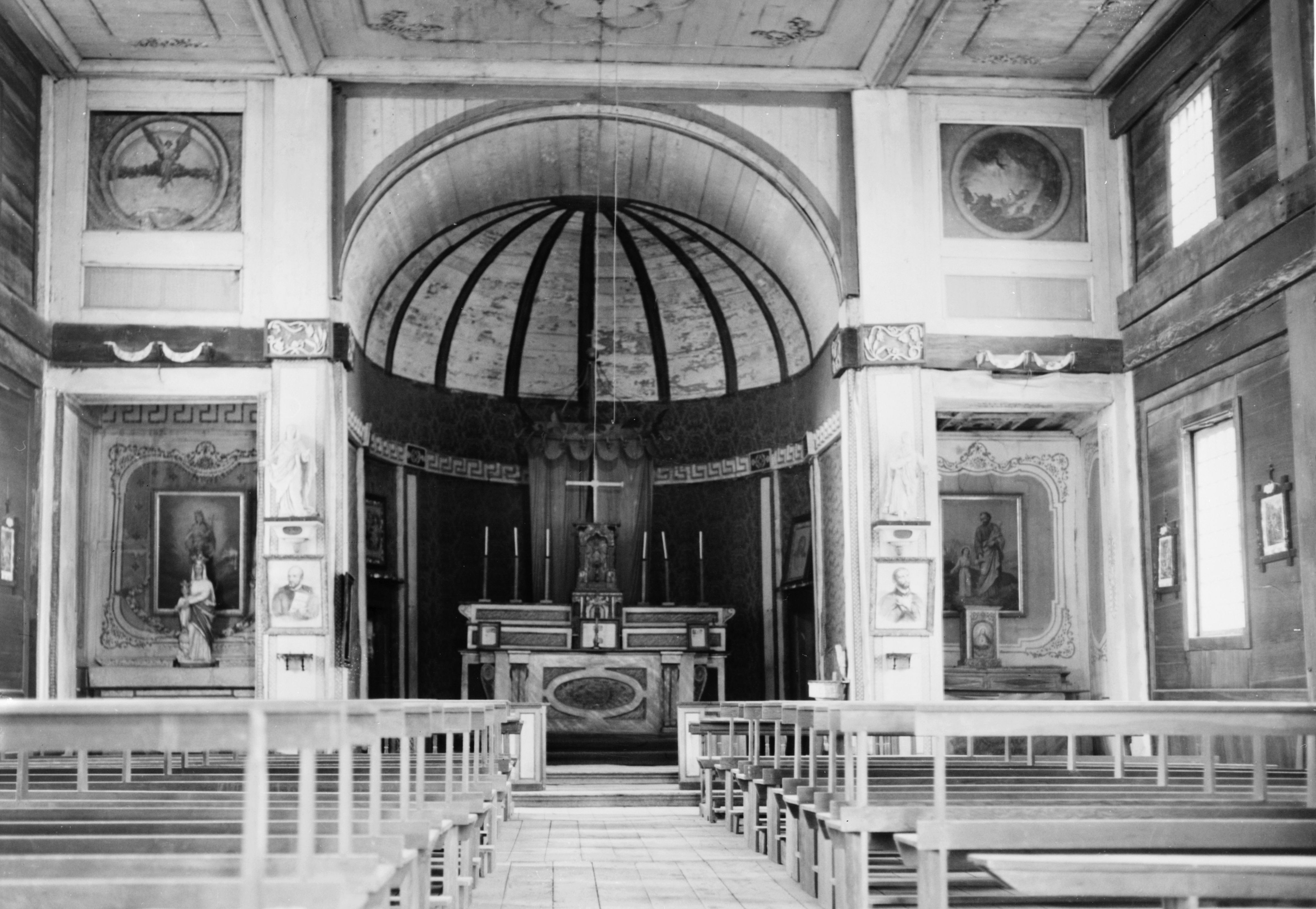
- Apse, in 1957
- Area: 22.9 acres (9.3 ha)
- Built: 1853
- Architect: Antonio Ravalli
- Architectural style: Greek Revival, Colonial
- NRHP reference No.: 66000312

Significant dates
- Added to NRHP: October 15, 1966
- Designated NHL: July 4, 1961

Coeur d'Alene's Old Mission State Park is a heritage-oriented state park in the city of Coeur d'Alene, Idaho, in the western United States, preserving the Mission of the Sacred Heart or Cataldo Mission, a National Historic Landmark. The park contains the church itself, the parish house, and the surrounding property. Built in 1850–1853, Mission of the Sacred Heart is the oldest standing building in Idaho. It was designated a National Historic Landmark in 1961, and listed on the National Register of Historic Places in 1966.

== History ==
In the early 19th century, Christian missionaries began arriving in the Pacific Northwest, including present-day Idaho, to preach to and convert local Native Americans. By 1831, the Nez Perce and Flathead people indigenous to what is now northern Idaho and western Montana had heard of the Bible and sought more information on Christianity. They sent six men east to St. Louis, with four arriving, and in 1842, Father Pierre-Jean De Smet responded to the request and traveled to the area. Friar Nicholas Point and Brother Charles Huet came along and helped to pick a suitable location for a Christian mission. The first site chosen was along the Saint Joe River and was subject to flooding. In 1846, the missionaries relocated the mission to its current location.

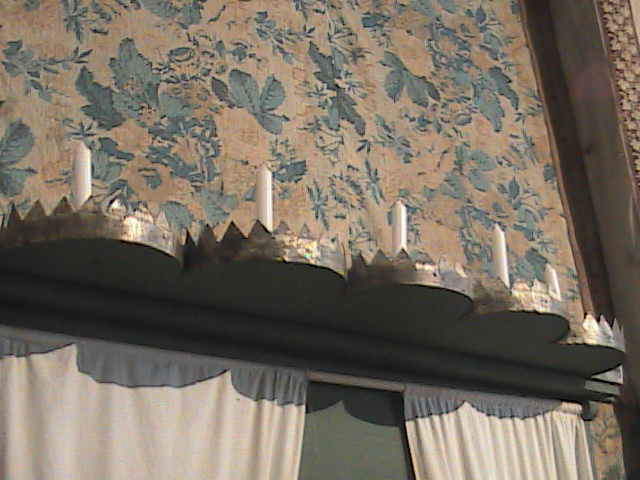
Example of the newspaper wallpaper and tin can metalwork

In 1850, the church was taken over by the Italian Jesuit missionary Antonio Ravalli, who began designing the new mission building. He had the building constructed by the Indians themselves so they would feel a personal connection to the church. It was built using the wattle and daub method and finished some three years later without using any nails.

The mission was named after the Sacred Heart of Jesus and the spot was later renamed Coeur d'Alene's Old Mission State Park by the Coeur d'Alene Tribe. A misnomer locally is to refer to the whole mission as the "Cataldo" Mission. This term cropped up in the area due to the fame of Father Joseph Cataldo (1837–1928), a Sicilian priest born in the village of Terrasini, who spent most of his missionary Jesuit life in the frontier community and founded Gonzaga University in nearby Spokane, Washington. The nearest town to the mission is Cataldo, Idaho. The mission became a rest and supply station for traders, settlers, and miners traveling on the Mullan Road. It was also a working port for boats heading up the Coeur d'Alene River.

In 1976, a major restoration of the church was chosen as Idaho State's Bicentennial Project to celebrate the nation's bicentennial.

== Mission area ==
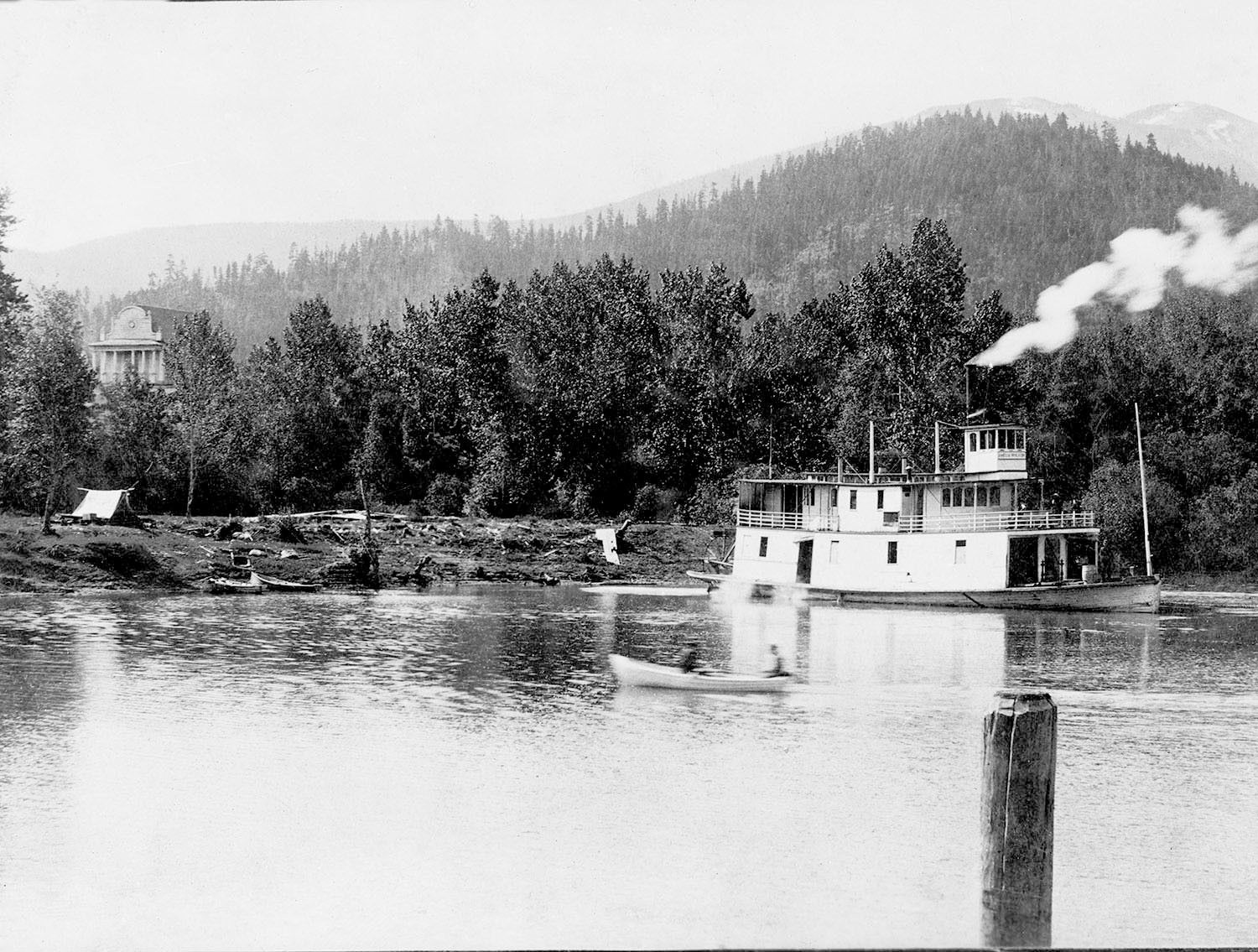
The Amelia Wheaton with the Old Mission in the background, c. 1885

Church

The walls were decorated with fabric bought from the Hudson's Bay Company and a hand-painted newspaper from Philadelphia that Fr. Ravalli had received in the mail. Tin cans were used to create the idea of chandeliers. Both wooden statues were carved by Fr. Rivalli with a knife and were intended to look like marble. The blue coloring of the interior wood is pressed huckleberries stains.

Parish house

After being burned down, it was rebuilt in 1887. It is a two-story building, with the upstairs used for sleeping quarters. It contains a smaller chapel, mostly used for daily Mass.

State park

The surrounding property has two cemeteries, a nature trail, and a visitors center. The site became Old Mission State Park in 1975 through a long-term lease with the Roman Catholic Diocese of Boise.

== See also ==
- List of the oldest churches in the United States
- List of National Historic Landmarks in Idaho
- National Register of Historic Places listings in Kootenai County, Idaho
- List of Idaho state parks
- List of Jesuit sites
- National Parks in Idaho
