= Idaho State Highway 4 =

State highway in Idaho, United States

State Highway 4
- Burke Road, Burke-Canyon Creek Road
- SH-4 highlighted in red

Route information
- Maintained by ITD
- Length: 7.380 mi (11.877 km)

Major junctions
- West end: I-90 in Wallace
- East end: FR 7623 at Burke

Location
- Country: United States
- State: Idaho
- Counties: Shoshone

Highway system
- Idaho State Highway System; Interstate; US; State
| ← SH-3 | → SH-5 |

State Highway 4 (SH-4) is a state highway in Shoshone County, in the U.S. state of Idaho. It runs 7.380 miles (11.877 km) from Interstate 90 (I-90) in Wallace, east to the ghost town of Burke.

== Route description ==
SH-4 begins at an intersection with I-90 in Wallace, then heads generally northeast through Burke Canyon, past historical markers for Frisco Hill and Burke, ending in Burke. The road continues eastward as National Forest Road No. 7623.

== History ==
In the 1930s, Route 4 was envisioned as a cross-state route, to directly connect Wallace to Thompson Falls, Montana over Glidden Pass, as seen on the 1937 map (later routed over Cooper Pass). This plan was abandoned due to impassable roads and World War II. Paved SH-4 was truncated at Burke.

National Forest Road 7623 still connects Burke to Montana Secondary Highway 471 leading to Thompson Falls.

== Major intersections ==
The entire route is in Shoshone County.

| Location | mi | km | Destinations | Notes |
|---|---|---|---|---|
| Wallace | 0.000 | 0.000 | I-90 / I-90 BL (The Harry F. Magnuson Way / Bank Street) – Coeur D'Alene, Mullan | I-90 exit 62; western terminus. |
| Burke | 7.380 | 11.877 | FR 7623 (Forest Service Road 7623) | Eastern terminus; continues as FR 7623 |
1.000 mi = 1.609 km; 1.000 km = 0.621 mi

== See also ==
- List of highways numbered 4
