= Idaho State Highway 3 =

State highway in Idaho, United States

State Highway 3
- North Idaho Medal of Honor Highway
- SH-3 highlighted in red

Route information
- Maintained by ITD
- Length: 117.680 mi (189.388 km)

Major junctions
- South end: US 12 near Spalding
- SH-99 in Kendrick; SH-8 in Deary; SH-8 in Bovill; SH-6 near Santa; SH-5 in St. Maries; SH-97 near Harrison
- North end: I-90 near Rose Lake

Location
- Country: United States
- State: Idaho
- Counties: Nez Perce, Latah, Shoshone, Benewah, Kootenai

Highway system
- Idaho State Highway System; Interstate; US; State
← US 2	→ SH-4

State Highway 3 (SH-3) is a state highway in northern Idaho, connecting U.S. Route 12 near Spalding, east of Lewiston, with Interstate 90 near Rose Lake, east of Coeur d'Alene. It is 117.68 miles (189.4 km) in length and runs north–south, east of and generally parallel to Idaho's primary north–south highway, U.S. Route 95.

== Route description ==
SH-3's southern terminus is near Arrow Gulch Creek Bridge to the east of Spalding on US 12 on the Nez Perce Indian Reservation in Nez Perce County. It then heads generally northeast into eastern Latah County, where it leaves the reservation, and continues through Juliaetta and Kendrick, where it intersects SH-99. It then continues generally north to Deary, where it overlaps SH-8. The overlapping highways continue east and northeast to Bovill, where they diverge.

SH-3 then continues generally north through Shoshone County, crossing the Saint Maries River, into Benewah County. It then turns generally northwest to Santa, where it intersects SH-6.

SH-3 then continues generally north to Saint Maries, where it intersects SH-5 before crossing the Saint Joe River and entering the Coeur d'Alene Indian Reservation. It then continues generally northwest and north past a historical marker for Saint Joseph Indian Mission into Kootenai County.

In Kootenai County, SH-3 continues generally north past an intersection with SH-97 and a historical marker for The Mullan Road, then over Mission Hill Creek Grade and Black Rock Grade before leaving the Coeur d'Alene reservation. It then turns east and northeast along and across the Coeur d'Alene River to Rose Lake. It then continues generally northeast and east to the northern terminus, east of the 4th of July Creek Bridge on I-90.

== History ==
In 2011, the state legislature designated SH-3 as the North Idaho Medal of Honor Highway.

== Major intersections ==
County	Location	mi	km	Destinations	Notes
Nez Perce		0.000	0.000	US 12 – Lewiston, Orofino, Missoula	Southern terminus
Latah	Kendrick	12.355	19.883	SH-99 north – Troy	
Latah	Deary	29.000	46.671	SH-8 west – Moscow	Begin SH-8 overlap
Latah	Bovill	39.000	62.764	SH-8 east – Elk River	End SH-8 overlap
Shoshone	No major junctions				
Benewah		70.070	112.767	SH-6	
Benewah	St. Maries	84.542	136.057	SH-5 west – Plummer	
Kootenai		95.880	154.304	SH-97 – Harrison	
Kootenai		117.680	189.388	I-90 – Coeur d'Alene, Kellogg, Missoula	
1.000 mi = 1.609 km; 1.000 km = 0.621 mi: Concurrency terminus

== See also ==
- List of state highways in Idaho
- List of highways numbered 3
