= Slickpoo, Idaho =

Unincorporated community in Idaho, US

- Unincorporated community
- Location within Idaho Location within the United States
- Coordinates: 46°19′01″N 116°42′40″W
- Country: United States
- State: Idaho
- County: Lewis
- Elevation: 1,749 ft (533 m)
- Time zone: UTC-8 (Pacific (PST))
  - Summer (DST): UTC-7 (PDT)
- Area codes: 208, 986
- GNIS feature ID: 398140

Slickpoo is an unincorporated community in Lewis County, Idaho, United States. It was named after Josiah Slickpoo, who helped Jesuit priest Joseph Cataldo expand his mission across Southern Idaho by providing land for Cataldo's new church. The rebuilt St. Joseph Mission still stands. It was also named Aishnima.
