= Kingston, Idaho =

Unincorporated community in the state of Idaho, United States

- Unincorporated community
- Location within Idaho Location within the United States
- Coordinates: 47°32′57″N 116°16′15″W
- Country: United States
- State: Idaho
- County: Shoshone
- Elevation: 2,169 ft (661 m)
- Time zone: UTC-8 (Pacific (PST))
  - Summer (DST): UTC-7 (PDT)
- ZIP code: 83839
- Area codes: 208, 986
- GNIS feature ID: 396747

Kingston is an unincorporated community in Shoshone County, Idaho, United States. Kingston is located on the south bank of the Coeur d'Alene River along Interstate 90 about 2 miles (3.2 km) northwest of Pinehurst.

Kingston has a post office with ZIP code 83839.

== History ==
Kingston's population was estimated at 350 in 1909, and was estimated at 500 in 1960.
