= Silverton, Idaho =

Unincorporated community in the state of Idaho, United States

Coordinates: 47°29′55″N 115°57′50″W

Silverton is an unincorporated community and Census-designated place in Shoshone County, Idaho, United States. As of the 2020 census, Silverton had a population of 594.

== Great Fire of 1910 ==
The National Fire Protection Association lists Silverton as the location of the Devil's Broom fire, also known as the Great Fire of 1910.
