= Osburn, Idaho =

City in Shoshone County, Idaho, United States

- City
- Location of Osburn in Shoshone County, Idaho.
- Coordinates: 47°30′15″N 115°59′30″W
- Country: United States
- State: Idaho
- County: Shoshone

Area
  - Total: 1.34 sq mi (3.46 km^{2})
  - Land: 1.32 sq mi (3.41 km^{2})
  - Water: 0.019 sq mi (0.05 km^{2})
- Elevation: 2,520 ft (770 m)

Population (2020)
  - Total: 1,567
  - Density: 1,181.4/sq mi (456.13/km^{2})
- Time zone: UTC-8 (Pacific (PST))
  - Summer (DST): UTC-7 (PDT)
- ZIP code: 83849
- Area codes: 208, 986
- FIPS code: 16-59590
- GNIS feature ID: 2411340
- Website: www.cityofosburn.org

Osburn is a city in Shoshone County, Idaho, United States, located in the Silver Valley mining region of northern Idaho. As of the 2020 census, Osburn had a population of 1,567.

== History ==
The city was named for Bill Osborne, who established a trading post here.

== Geography ==
According to the United States Census Bureau, the city has a total area of 1.33 square miles (3.44 km^{2}), of which, 1.31 square miles (3.39 km^{2}) is land and 0.02 square miles (0.05 km^{2}) is water.

== Demographics ==
Historical population
Census	Pop.	Note	%±
1960	1,788		—
1970	2,248		25.7%
1980	2,220		−1.2%
1990	1,579		−28.9%
2000	1,545		−2.2%
2010	1,555		0.6%
2020	1,567		0.8%
2019 (est.)	1,556		0.1%
U.S. Decennial Census

=== 2020 census ===
As of the 2020 census, Osburn had a population of 1,567. The median age was 47.8 years. 21.2% of residents were under the age of 18, and 24.1% of residents were 65 years of age or older. For every 100 females there were 102.5 males, and for every 100 females age 18 and over there were 101.5 males age 18 and over.

0.0% of residents lived in urban areas, while 100.0% lived in rural areas.

There were 716 households in Osburn, of which 24.4% had children under the age of 18 living in them. Of all households, 45.5% were married-couple households, 22.9% were households with a male householder and no spouse or partner present, and 23.9% were households with a female householder and no spouse or partner present. About 34.4% of all households were made up of individuals, and 20.7% had someone living alone who was 65 years of age or older.

There were 768 housing units, of which 6.8% were vacant. The homeowner vacancy rate was 1.2% and, and the rental vacancy rate was 3.1%.

Racial composition as of the 2020 census
Race	Number	Percent
White	1,469	93.7%
Black or African American	6	0.4%
American Indian and Alaska Native	4	0.3%
Asian	8	0.5%
Native Hawaiian and Other Pacific Islander	1	0.1%
Some other race	10	0.6%
Two or more races	69	4.4%
Hispanic or Latino (of any race)	62	4.0%

=== 2010 census ===
At the 2010 census, there were 1,555 people in 711 households, including 443 families, in the city. The population density was 1,187.0 inhabitants per square mile (458.3/km^{2}). There were 777 housing units at an average density of 593.1 per square mile (229.0/km^{2}). The racial makeup of the city was 95.8% White, 0.3% African American, 1.5% Native American, 0.3% Asian, 0.1% Pacific Islander, 0.5% from other races, and 1.6% from two or more races. Hispanics or Latinos of any race were 4.2%.

Of the 711 households, 24.2% had children under the age of 18 living with them, 51.3% were married couples living together, 6.6% had a female householder with no husband present, 4.4% had a male householder with no wife present, and 37.7% were non-families. 32.9% of households were one person, and 15.8% were one person aged 65 or older. The average household size was 2.19, and the average family size was 2.76.

The median age was 48.1 years. 20.5% of residents were under the age of 18; 5.3% were between the ages of 18 and 24; 19.6% were from 25 to 44; 32.1% were from 45 to 64; and 22.4% were 65 or older. The gender makeup of the city was 50.4% male and 49.6% female.

=== 2000 census ===
At the 2000 census, there were 1,545 people in 699 households, including 457 families, in the city. The population density was 1,154.4 inhabitants per square mile (445.7/km^{2}). There were 786 housing units at an average density of 587.3 per square mile (226.8/km^{2}). The racial makeup of the city was 95.40% White, 0.32% African American, 1.62% Native American, 0.13% Asian, 0.06% Pacific Islander, 0.32% from other races, and 2.14% from two or more races. Hispanics or Latinos of any race were 2.33%.

Of the 699 households, 23.0% had children under the age of 18 living with them, 54.8% were married couples living together, 7.3% had a female householder with no husband present, and 34.5% were non-families. 29.0% of households were one person, and 14.9% were one person aged 65 or older. The average household size was 2.21, and the average family size was 2.70.

The age distribution was 20.1% under the age of 18, 6.1% from 18 to 24, 24.9% from 25 to 44, 28.3% from 45 to 64, and 20.7% 65 or older. The median age was 45 years. For every 100 females, there were 98.1 males. For every 100 females age 18 and over, there were 93.0 males.

The median household income was $29,856, and the median family income was $34,605. Males had a median income of $31,574 versus $20,769 for females. The per capita income for the city was $17,532. About 10.1% of families and 11.7% of the population were below the poverty line, including 17.2% of those under age 18 and 4.6% of those age 65 or over.

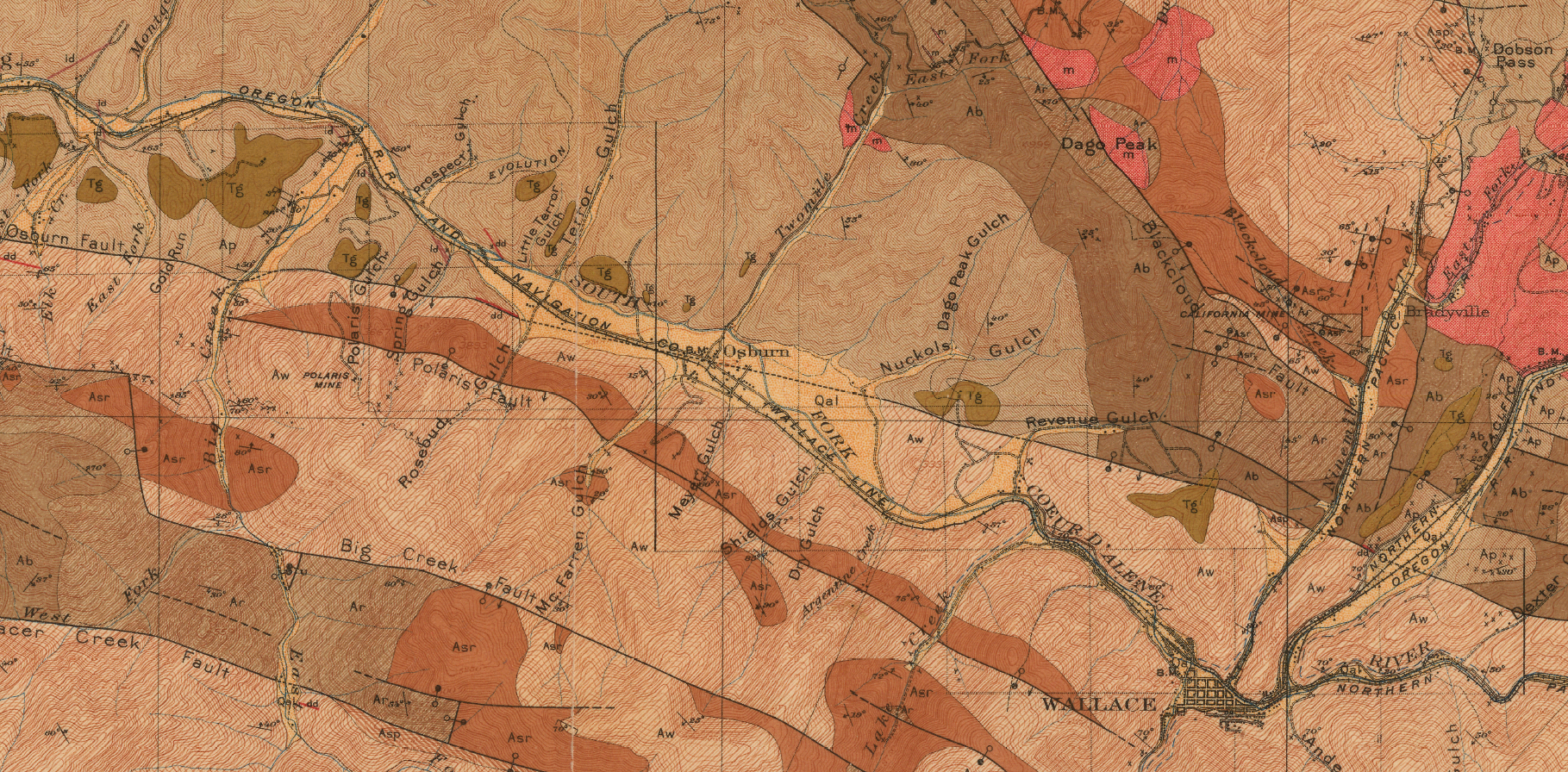
1907 geological map of Osburn, showing the Osburn Fault, the Polaris Fault, and the Polaris Mine, northeast of the future Sunshine Mine.

== See also ==
- List of cities in Idaho
