= Smelterville, Idaho =

- City
- Location of Smelterville in Shoshone County, Idaho
- Coordinates: 47°32′33″N 116°10′38″W
- Country: United States
- State: Idaho
- County: Shoshone

Area
  - Total: 0.31 sq mi (0.79 km^{2})
  - Land: 0.31 sq mi (0.79 km^{2})
  - Water: 0 sq mi (0.00 km^{2})
- Elevation: 2,228 ft (679 m)

Population (2020)
  - Total: 670
  - Density: 2,032.3/sq mi (784.66/km^{2})
- Time zone: UTC-8 (Pacific (PST))
  - Summer (DST): UTC-7 (PDT)
- ZIP code: 83868
- Area codes: 208, 986
- FIPS code: 16-75070
- GNIS feature ID: 2411909

Smelterville is a city in Shoshone County, Idaho, United States. As of the 2020 census, Smelterville had a population of 670.

The town was named in 1929 by a voice vote of its residents; the other choices were Van Rena and Silver City (already used in southwestern Idaho). The presence of the Bunker Hill smelter, which started operating in 1917, caused the name to be selected.

== Geography ==
According to the United States Census Bureau, the city has a total area of 0.31 square miles (0.80 km^{2}), all of it land.

== Demographics ==
Historical population
Census	Pop.	Note	%±
1950	76		—
1960	1,127		1,382.9%
1970	967		−14.2%
1980	776		−19.8%
1990	464		−40.2%
2000	651		40.3%
2010	627		−3.7%
2020	670		6.9%
2019 (est.)	621		−1.0%
U.S. Decennial Census

=== 2010 census ===
As of the census of 2010, there were 627 people, 305 households, and 154 families residing in the city. The population density was 2,022.6 inhabitants per square mile (780.9/km^{2}). There were 370 housing units at an average density of 1,193.5 per square mile (460.8/km^{2}). The racial makeup of the city was 95.4% White, 0.5% African American, 1.8% Native American, 0.2% Pacific Islander, 0.6% from other races, and 1.6% from two or more races. Hispanic or Latino people of any race were 4.6% of the population.

There were 305 households, of which 22.3% had children under the age of 18 living with them, 37.7% were married couples living together, 8.5% had a female householder with no husband present, 4.3% had a male householder with no wife present, and 49.5% were non-families. 40.7% of all households were made up of individuals, and 16.4% had someone living alone who was 65 years of age or older. The average household size was 2.06 and the average family size was 2.79.

The median age in the city was 42.6 years. 20.3% of residents were under the age of 18; 8.3% were between the ages of 18 and 24; 24.5% were from 25 to 44; 30.8% were from 45 to 64; and 15.9% were 65 years of age or older. The gender makeup of the city was 52.2% male and 47.8% female.

=== 2000 census ===
As of the census of 2000, there were 651 people, 308 households, and 165 families residing in the city. The population density was 2,049.1 inhabitants per square mile (791.2/km^{2}). There were 355 housing units at an average density of 1,117.4 per square mile (431.4/km^{2}). The racial makeup of the city was 96.77% White, 0.15% African American, 1.54% Native American, 0.15% Asian, 0.31% from other races, and 1.08% from two or more races. Hispanic or Latino people of any race were 1.54% of the population.

There were 308 households, out of which 21.4% had children under the age of 18 living with them, 38.3% were married couples living together, 8.8% had a female householder with no husband present, and 46.4% were non-families. 37.7% of all households were made up of individuals, and 16.6% had someone living alone who was 65 years of age or older. The average household size was 2.11 and the average family size was 2.75.

In the city, the population was spread out, with 21.2% under the age of 18, 8.6% from 18 to 24, 27.6% from 25 to 44, 24.0% from 45 to 64, and 18.6% who were 65 years of age or older. The median age was 39 years. For every 100 females, there were 104.1 males. For every 100 females age 18 and over, there were 106.0 males.

The median income for a household in the city was $21,908, and the median income for a family was $30,341. Males had a median income of $26,029 versus $16,250 for females. The per capita income for the city was $14,572. About 15.5% of families and 22.4% of the population were below the poverty line, including 29.1% of those under age 18 and 12.5% of those age 65 or over.
