= Pinehurst, Idaho =

- City
- Location of Pinehurst in Shoshone County, Idaho.
- Coordinates: 47°32′11″N 116°13′58″W
- Country: United States
- State: Idaho
- County: Shoshone

Area
  - Total: 1.00 sq mi (2.58 km^{2})
  - Land: 1.00 sq mi (2.58 km^{2})
  - Water: 0 sq mi (0.00 km^{2})
- Elevation: 2,225 ft (678 m)

Population (2020)
  - Total: 1,679
  - Density: 1,633/sq mi (630.4/km^{2})
- Time zone: UTC-8 (Pacific (PST))
  - Summer (DST): UTC-7 (PDT)
- ZIP code: 83850
- Area codes: 208, 986
- FIPS code: 16-63100
- GNIS feature ID: 2411424

Pinehurst is a city in Shoshone County, Idaho, United States. Located at the west end of the Silver Valley mining region, Pinehurst had a population of 1,679 at the 2020 census.

== Geography ==
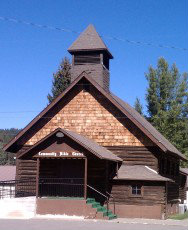
Pine Creek Baptist Church, Pinehurst

According to the United States Census Bureau, the city has a total area of 1.05 square miles (2.72 km^{2}), all of it land.

== Demographics ==
Historical population
| Census | Pop. | Note | %± |
|---|---|---|---|
| 1960 | 1,432 | | — |
| 1970 | 1,934 | | 35.1% |
| 1980 | 2,183 | | 12.9% |
| 1990 | 1,722 | | −21.1% |
| 2000 | 1,661 | | −3.5% |
| 2010 | 1,619 | | −2.5% |
| 2020 | 1,679 | | 3.7% |
| 2019 (est.) | 1,626 | | 0.4% |
U.S. Decennial Census

=== 2020 census ===
As of the 2020 census, Pinehurst had a population of 1,679. The median age was 49.6 years. 17.9% of residents were under the age of 18 and 27.2% of residents were 65 years of age or older. For every 100 females there were 92.1 males, and for every 100 females age 18 and over there were 89.9 males age 18 and over.

0.0% of residents lived in urban areas, while 100.0% lived in rural areas.

There were 741 households in Pinehurst, of which 21.1% had children under the age of 18 living in them. Of all households, 47.9% were married-couple households, 18.4% were households with a male householder and no spouse or partner present, and 26.6% were households with a female householder and no spouse or partner present. About 33.0% of all households were made up of individuals and 18.0% had someone living alone who was 65 years of age or older.

There were 801 housing units, of which 7.5% were vacant. The homeowner vacancy rate was 1.6% and the rental vacancy rate was 3.8%.

Racial composition as of the 2020 census
| Race | Number | Percent |
|---|---|---|
| White | 1,514 | 90.2% |
| Black or African American | 4 | 0.2% |
| American Indian and Alaska Native | 23 | 1.4% |
| Asian | 11 | 0.7% |
| Native Hawaiian and Other Pacific Islander | 0 | 0.0% |
| Some other race | 16 | 1.0% |
| Two or more races | 111 | 6.6% |
| Hispanic or Latino (of any race) | 48 | 2.9% |

=== 2010 census ===
As of the census of 2010, there were 1,619 people, 721 households, and 458 families living in the city. The population density was 1,541.9 inhabitants per square mile (595.3/km^{2}). There were 810 housing units at an average density of 771.4 per square mile (297.8/km^{2}). The racial makeup of the city was 96.4% White, 0.1% African American, 1.0% Native American, 0.8% Asian, 0.2% from other races, and 1.5% from two or more races. Hispanic or Latino of any race were 3.5% of the population.

There were 721 households, of which 26.5% had children under the age of 18 living with them, 51.0% were married couples living together, 7.8% had a female householder with no husband present, 4.7% had a male householder with no wife present, and 36.5% were non-families. 31.9% of all households were made up of individuals, and 19.1% had someone living alone who was 65 years of age or older. The average household size was 2.25 and the average family size was 2.81.

The median age in the city was 45.8 years. 21.8% of residents were under the age of 18; 6.6% were between the ages of 18 and 24; 20.5% were from 25 to 44; 27.4% were from 45 to 64; and 23.7% were 65 years of age or older. The gender makeup of the city was 48.0% male and 52.0% female.

=== 2000 census ===
As of the census of 2000, there were 1,661 people, 720 households, and 495 families living in the city. The population density was 1,543.6 inhabitants per square mile (596.0/km^{2}). There were 773 housing units at an average density of 718.4 per square mile (277.4/km^{2}). The racial makeup of the city was 96.63% White, 1.38% Native American, 0.24% Asian, 0.06% Pacific Islander, 0.42% from other races, and 1.26% from two or more races. Hispanic or Latino of any race were 1.87% of the population.

There were 720 households, out of which 27.4% had children under the age of 18 living with them, 55.7% were married couples living together, 8.9% had a female householder with no husband present, and 31.3% were non-families. 28.1% of all households were made up of individuals, and 15.6% had someone living alone who was 65 years of age or older. The average household size was 2.31 and the average family size was 2.80.

In the city, the population was spread out, with 23.1% under the age of 18, 6.9% from 18 to 24, 25.1% from 25 to 44, 25.6% from 45 to 64, and 19.3% who were 65 years of age or older. The median age was 42 years. For every 100 females, there were 89.2 males. For every 100 females age 18 and over, there were 89.9 males.

The median income for a household in the city was $27,757, and the median income for a family was $34,185. Males had a median income of $31,932 versus $20,000 for females. The per capita income for the city was $15,268. About 13.5% of families and 14.8% of the population were below the poverty line, including 22.3% of those under age 18 and 9.4% of those age 65 or over.
