= Shoshone County, Idaho =

County in Idaho, United States

- County
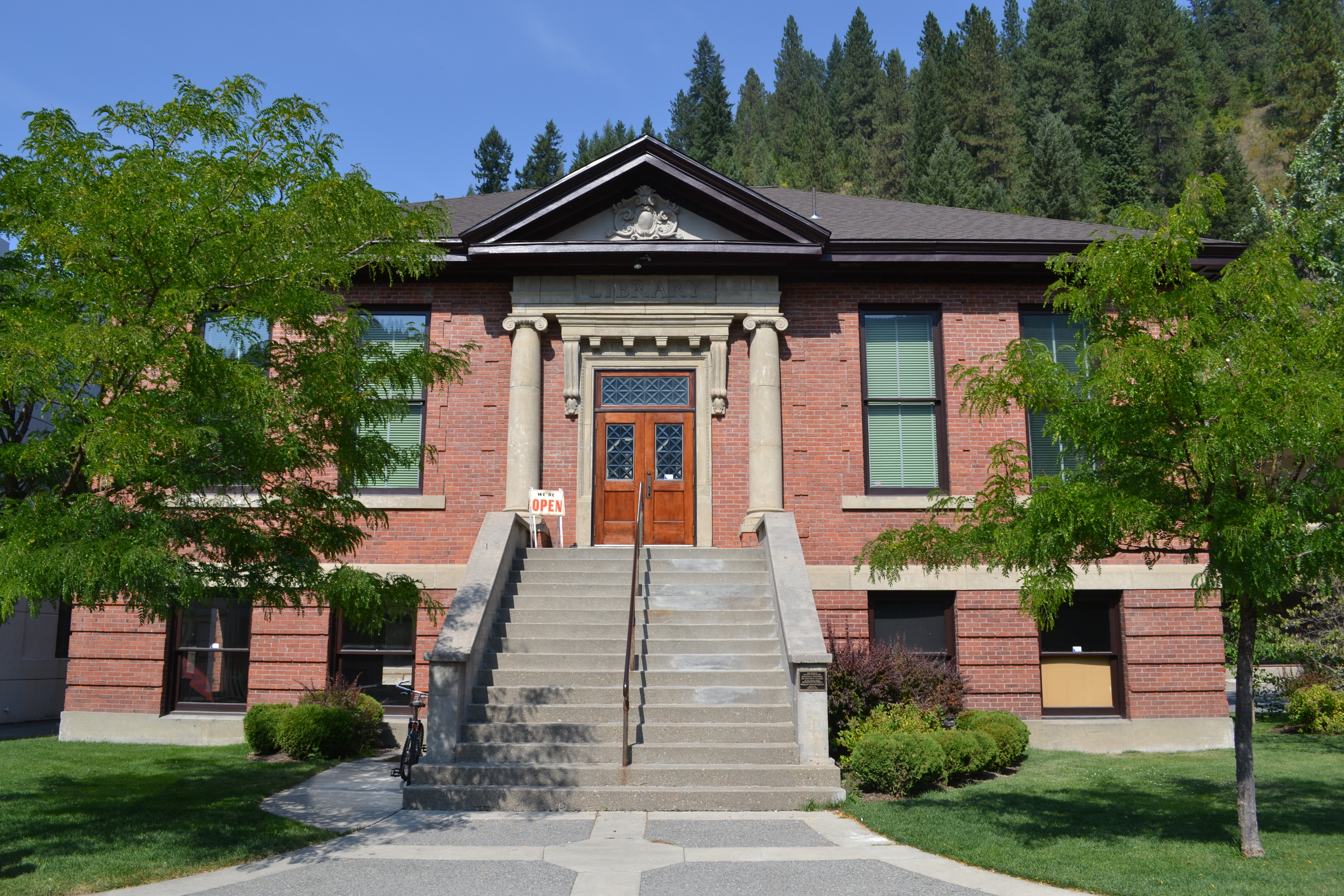
- Wallace Carnegie Library

- Seal

- Location within the U.S. state of Idaho
- Country: United States
- State: Idaho
- Founded: February 4, 1864
- Named for: Shoshone tribe
- Seat: Wallace
- Largest city: Kellogg

Area
  - Total: 2,635 sq mi (6,820 km^{2})
  - Land: 2,630 sq mi (6,800 km^{2})
  - Water: 5.5 sq mi (14 km^{2}) 0.2%

Population (2020)
  - Total: 13,169
  - Estimate (2025): 14,130 ▲
  - Density: 5.01/sq mi (1.93/km^{2})
- Time zone: UTC−8 (Pacific)
  - Summer (DST): UTC−7 (PDT)
- Congressional district: 1st
- Website: shoshonecounty.id.gov

Shoshone County shə-SHOHN is a county in the U.S. state of Idaho. As of the 2020 census, the population was 13,169. The county seat is Wallace and the largest city is Kellogg. The county was established in 1864, named for the Native American Shoshone tribe.

Shoshone County is commonly referred to as the Silver Valley, due to its century-old mining history. The Silver Valley is famous nationwide for the vast amounts of silver, lead, and zinc mined from it.

== History ==
Shoshone County was formed under the Territory of Washington on January 9, 1861. The territorial legislature established the county in anticipation of the gold rush that occurred after the discovery of gold at Pierce in October 1860. Their location of the northern boundary at a line drawn due east from the mouth of the Clearwater River, unknowingly placed the emerging mining settlement at Pierce outside of the county's boundaries while residents of the new Mormon settlement at Franklin were unknowingly within the established boundaries. Regardless of the geographic reality, the county seat was at Pierce.

Growth at Pierce was so rapid that Shoshone County boasted the largest vote of any county within Washington Territory at the territorial election of July 8, 1861. In less than a year, Shoshone County contained additional settlements at Lewiston, Elk City, Newsome, and Florence. On December 20, 1861, Nez Perce and Idaho counties were created from most of the original territory of Shoshone County. On the following day, Shoshone's boundaries were shifted northward, containing most of present-day Clearwater County and a portion of present-day Shoshone County.

This new boundary alignment left the existing settlement at Pierce and the new settlement of Orofino as the county's only settlements. The county's population dwindled as prospectors abandoned Pierce for gold prospects at Elk City and Florence. Idaho Territory was created in 1863 and the first census of the territory in that year enumerated only 574 residents in Shoshone County. The county boundaries were expanded to include the Silver Valley by the legislative assembly of Idaho Territory when it officially created Shoshone County on February 4, 1864. The expanded territory contained no population at the second census of Idaho Territory in 1864. All of the county's 276 residents were located at Pierce and Orofino. In the 1870 national census, 65% of the population were Chinese.

Until 1904, Shoshone County included present-day Clearwater County to the south. That portion was annexed by Nez Perce County for several years and then was established as a new county in 1911. When the Silver Valley population rose dramatically in the 1880s, the seat was moved to Murray in 1884 (and to Wallace in 1898) to better serve the majority of the county's population. The southern area's population increased with homesteading in the Weippe area in the late 1890s. The vast distance and time required for travel to Wallace from the Clearwater River area prompted the southern portion to move to Nez Perce County.

Hard rock miners in Shoshone County protested wage cuts with a strike in 1892. After several died in a shooting war provoked by discovery of a company spy, the U.S. Army forced an end to the strike. Hostilities erupted once again in 1899 when, in response to the company firing seventeen men for joining the union, the miners dynamited the Bunker Hill & Sullivan mill. Again, people died, and the U.S. Army intervened, requested by Governor Frank Steunenberg, as the Idaho National Guard troops were still stationed in the Philippines following the Spanish–American War. Steunenberg was assassinated outside his residence in Caldwell in 1905, nearly five years after leaving office, and the subsequent trials in Boise in 1907 made national headlines.

Much of the county was burned in the Great Fire of 1910, including parts of Wallace.

== Geography ==
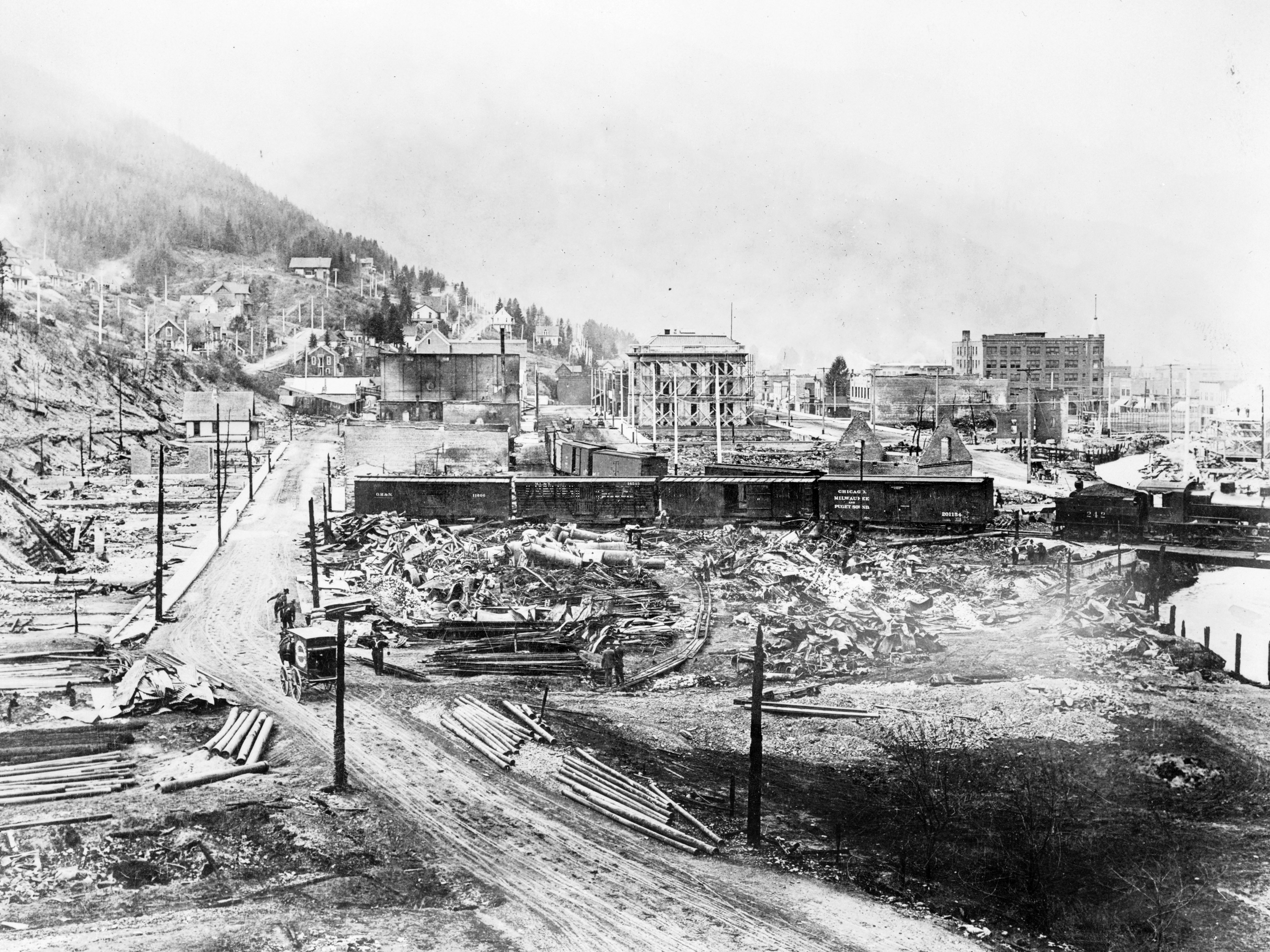
Wallace following the Great Fire of 1910

According to the U.S. Census Bureau, the county has an area of 2,635 square miles (6,820 km^{2}), of which 2,630 square miles (6,800 km^{2}) is land and 5.5 square miles (14 km^{2}) (0.2%) is water.

=== Adjacent counties ===
- Bonner County - north
- Sanders County, Montana - northeast/Mountain Time Border
- Mineral County, Montana - southeast/Mountain Time Border
- Clearwater County - south
- Latah County - southwest
- Benewah County - west
- Kootenai County - northwest

=== Major highways ===
- I-90
- I-90 BS
- SH-3
- SH-4

=== Transit ===
- Jefferson Lines

=== National protected areas ===
- Clearwater National Forest (part)
- Coeur d'Alene National Forest (part)
- St. Joe National Forest (part)

== Demographics ==
Historical population
Census	Pop.	Note	%±
1870	722		—
1880	469		−35.0%
1890	5,382		1,047.5%
1900	11,950		122.0%
1910	13,963		16.8%
1920	14,250		2.1%
1930	19,060		33.8%
1940	21,230		11.4%
1950	22,806		7.4%
1960	20,876		−8.5%
1970	19,718		−5.5%
1980	19,226		−2.5%
1990	13,931		−27.5%
2000	13,771		−1.1%
2010	12,765		−7.3%
2020	13,169		3.2%
2025 (est.)	14,130	▲	7.3%
U.S. Decennial Census; 1790–1960 1900–1990; 1990–2000 2010–2020 2020

=== Racial and ethnic composition ===
Shoshone County, Idaho – Racial and ethnic composition Note: the US Census treats Hispanic/Latino as an ethnic category. This table excludes Latinos from the racial categories and assigns them to a separate category. Hispanics/Latinos may be of any race.
Race / Ethnicity (NH = Non-Hispanic)	Pop 1980	Pop 1990	Pop 2000	Pop 2010	Pop 2020	% 1980	% 1990	% 2000	% 2010	% 2020
White alone (NH)	18,677	13,461	13,047	11,929	11,771	97.14%	96.63%	94.74%	93.45%	89.38%
Black or African American alone (NH)	6	14	15	20	15	0.03%	0.10%	0.11%	0.16%	0.11%
Native American or Alaska Native alone (NH)	213	171	185	177	145	1.11%	1.23%	1.34%	1.39%	1.10%
Asian alone (NH)	29	36	32	44	53	0.15%	0.26%	0.23%	0.34%	0.40%
Native Hawaiian or Pacific Islander alone (NH)	x	x	9	5	6	x	x	0.07%	0.04%	0.05%
Other race alone (NH)	4	2	1	6	83	0.02%	0.01%	0.01%	0.05%	0.63%
Mixed race or Multiracial (NH)	x	x	216	204	646	x	x	1.57%	1.60%	4.91%
Hispanic or Latino (any race)	297	247	266	380	450	1.54%	1.77%	1.93%	2.98%	3.42%
Total	19,226	13,931	13,771	12,765	13,169	100.00%	100.00%	100.00%	100.00%	100.00%

=== 2020 census ===
As of the 2020 census, the county had a population of 13,169. The median age was 48.2 years. 19.6% of residents were under the age of 18 and 25.2% of residents were 65 years of age or older. For every 100 females there were 101.5 males, and for every 100 females age 18 and over there were 100.4 males age 18 and over.

The racial makeup of the county was 91.0% White, 0.2% Black or African American, 1.2% American Indian and Alaska Native, 0.4% Asian, 0.0% Native Hawaiian and Pacific Islander, 1.1% from some other race, and 6.0% from two or more races. Hispanic or Latino residents of any race comprised 3.4% of the population.

0.0% of residents lived in urban areas, while 100.0% lived in rural areas.

There were 5,836 households in the county, of which 22.8% had children under the age of 18 living with them and 24.1% had a female householder with no spouse or partner present. About 33.6% of all households were made up of individuals and 17.4% had someone living alone who was 65 years of age or older. There were 6,990 housing units, of which 16.5% were vacant. Among occupied housing units, 71.8% were owner-occupied and 28.2% were renter-occupied. The homeowner vacancy rate was 1.9% and the rental vacancy rate was 6.0%.

=== 2010 census ===
As of the 2010 United States census, there were 12,765 people, 5,605 households, and 3,511 families living in the county. The population density was 4.9 inhabitants per square mile (1.9/km^{2}). There were 7,061 housing units at an average density of 2.7 units per square mile (1.0 units/km^{2}). The racial makeup of the county was 95.4% white, 1.4% American Indian, 0.4% Asian, 0.2% black or African American, 0.1% Pacific islander, 0.5% from other races, and 2.0% from two or more races. Those of Hispanic or Latino origin made up 3.0% of the population. In terms of ancestry, 32.2% were German, 17.6% were Irish, 13.5% were English, 6.4% were Norwegian, and 4.4% were American.

Of the 5,605 households, 25.4% had children under the age of 18 living with them, 48.5% were married couples living together, 8.7% had a female householder with no husband present, 37.4% were non-families, and 31.3% of all households were made up of individuals. The average household size was 2.25 and the average family size was 2.79. The median age was 46.2 years.

The median income for a household in the county was $36,654 and the median income for a family was $44,685. Males had a median income of $38,315 versus $25,273 for females. The per capita income for the county was $19,020. About 13.8% of families and 17.9% of the population were below the poverty line, including 22.5% of those under age 18 and 8.3% of those age 65 or over.

=== 2000 census ===
As of the census of 2000, there were 13,771 people, 5,906 households, and 3,856 families living in the county. The population density was 5 people per square mile (1.9 people/km^{2}). There were 7,057 housing units at an average density of 3 units per square mile (1.2 units/km^{2}). The racial makeup of the county was 95.84% White, 0.11% Black or African American, 1.52% Native American, 0.23% Asian, 0.07% Pacific Islander, 0.49% from other races, and 1.74% from two or more races. 1.93% of the population were Hispanic or Latino of any race. 22.1% were of German, 14.0% American, 11.3% English, 9.7% Irish and 5.9% Norwegian ancestry.

There were 5,906 households, out of which 26.70% had children under the age of 18 living with them, 52.70% were married couples living together, 8.10% had a female householder with no husband present, and 34.70% were non-families. 29.40% of all households were made up of individuals, and 13.60% had someone living alone who was 65 years of age or older. The average household size was 2.30 and the average family size was 2.82.

In the county, the population was spread out, with 22.90% under the age of 18, 6.70% from 18 to 24, 25.50% from 25 to 44, 27.40% from 45 to 64, and 17.40% who were 65 years of age or older. The median age was 42 years. For every 100 females there were 99.40 males. For every 100 females age 18 and over, there were 97.00 males.

The median income for a household in the county was $28,535, and the median income for a family was $35,694. Males had a median income of $30,439 versus $18,831 for females. The per capita income for the county was $15,934. About 12.40% of families and 16.40% of the population were below the poverty line, including 21.80% of those under age 18 and 10.00% of those age 65 or over.

== Politics ==
United States presidential election results for Shoshone County, Idaho
Year	Republican		Democratic		Third party(ies)	
Year	No.	%	No.	%	No.	%
1892	936	48.95%	0	0.00%	976	51.05%
1896	497	21.98%	1,760	77.84%	4	0.18%
1900	2,378	44.27%	2,994	55.73%	0	0.00%
1904	3,095	62.04%	1,116	22.37%	778	15.59%
1908	3,256	55.07%	2,109	35.67%	547	9.25%
1912	1,399	27.68%	1,634	32.33%	2,021	39.99%
1916	2,431	33.90%	4,239	59.11%	501	6.99%
1920	3,112	64.23%	1,733	35.77%	0	0.00%
1924	3,034	51.02%	835	14.04%	2,078	34.94%
1928	3,648	59.64%	2,430	39.73%	39	0.64%
1932	2,902	39.49%	4,347	59.15%	100	1.36%
1936	2,146	28.30%	5,377	70.92%	59	0.78%
1940	3,525	34.65%	6,565	64.54%	82	0.81%
1944	3,162	37.36%	5,290	62.51%	11	0.13%
1948	3,200	38.74%	4,472	54.13%	589	7.13%
1952	5,119	51.91%	4,684	47.50%	59	0.60%
1956	4,598	50.83%	4,448	49.17%	0	0.00%
1960	3,432	40.70%	5,001	59.30%	0	0.00%
1964	2,884	35.70%	5,194	64.30%	0	0.00%
1968	3,080	40.60%	3,850	50.74%	657	8.66%
1972	3,868	53.67%	3,020	41.90%	319	4.43%
1976	3,570	51.67%	3,216	46.55%	123	1.78%
1980	3,994	52.04%	3,102	40.42%	579	7.54%
1984	3,156	50.22%	3,033	48.27%	95	1.51%
1988	2,134	38.20%	3,379	60.49%	73	1.31%
1992	1,441	22.01%	3,182	48.59%	1,925	29.40%
1996	1,588	26.67%	2,981	50.07%	1,385	23.26%
2000	2,879	53.46%	2,225	41.32%	281	5.22%
2004	2,922	54.75%	2,331	43.68%	84	1.57%
2008	2,953	52.11%	2,521	44.49%	193	3.41%
2012	2,699	52.43%	2,277	44.23%	172	3.34%
2016	3,297	64.39%	1,384	27.03%	439	8.57%
2020	4,216	69.70%	1,693	27.99%	140	2.31%
2024	4,500	73.39%	1,472	24.01%	160	2.61%

Shoshone County was historically a Democratic-leaning county, owing to its unionized mining industry. In recent years the county has consistently voted for Republican presidential candidates, while favoring Democratic candidates locally and statewide.

== Communities ==
=== Cities ===
- Kellogg
- Mullan
- Osburn
- Pinehurst
- Smelterville
- Wallace
- Wardner

=== Census-designated place ===
- Silverton

=== Unincorporated communities ===
- Adair
- Avery
- Big Creek
- Calder
- Cataldo
- Clarkia
- Enaville
- Gold Creek
- Hoyt
- Kingston
- Murray
- Prichard

=== Ghost town ===
- Burke

== Ski areas ==
- Lookout Pass
- Silver Mountain

== Education ==
School districts include:

- Avery School District 394
- Kellogg Joint School District 391
- Mullan School District 392
- St. Maries Joint School District 41
- Wallace School District 393

It is in the catchment area, but not the taxation zone, for North Idaho College.

== See also ==
- Coeur d'Alene, Idaho labor confrontation of 1899
- National Register of Historic Places listings in Shoshone County, Idaho
