= Harrison, Idaho =

- City
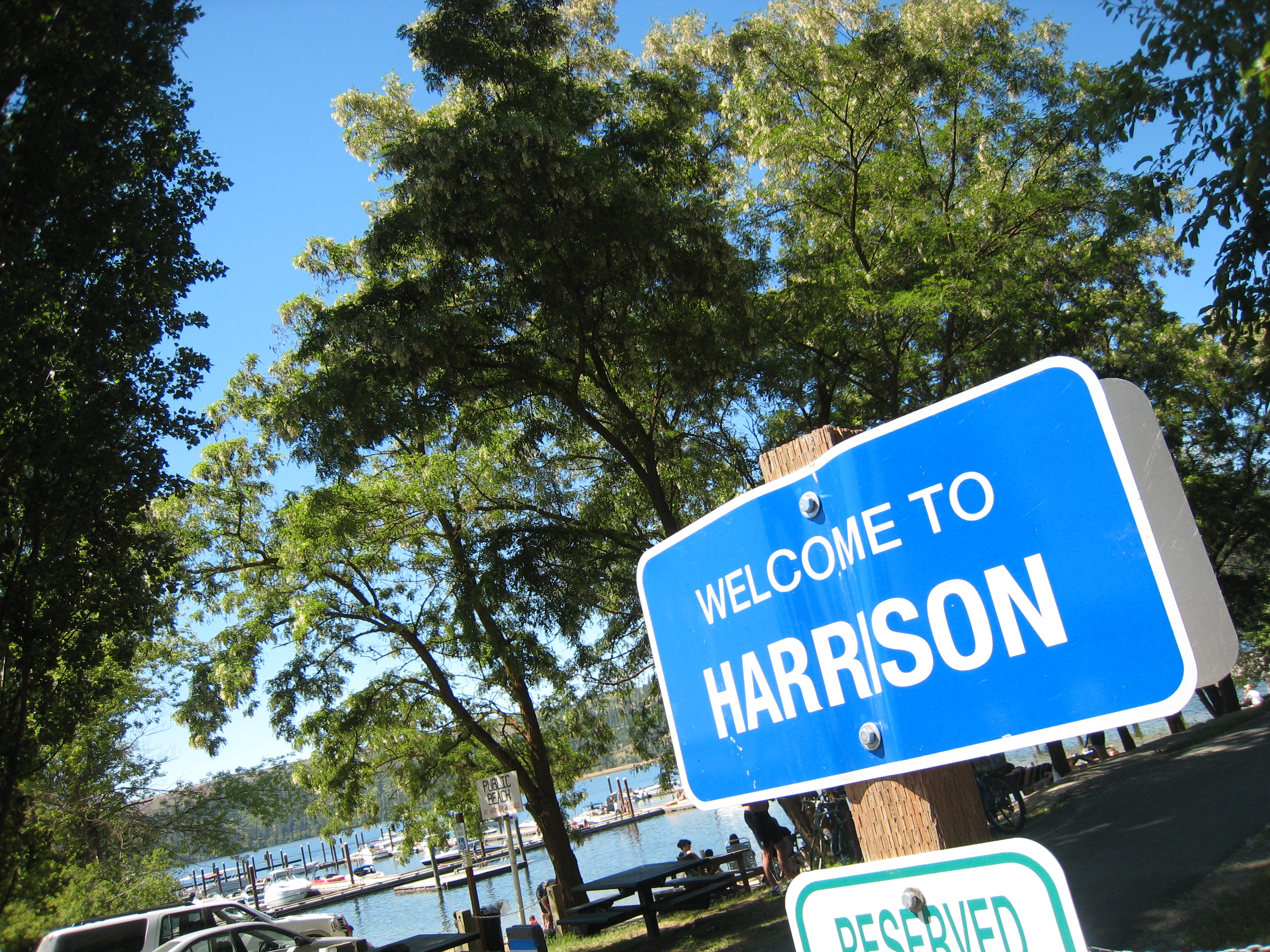
- Welcome sign in Harrison

- Location of Harrison in Kootenai County, Idaho.

- Location in the United States
- Coordinates: 47°28′03″N 116°48′12″W
- Country: United States
- State: Idaho
- County: Kootenai

Area
  - Total: 4.40 sq mi (11.40 km^{2})
  - Land: 3.56 sq mi (9.23 km^{2})
  - Water: 0.84 sq mi (2.18 km^{2})
- Elevation: 2,274 ft (693 m)

Population (2020)
  - Total: 233
  - Density: 60.6/sq mi (23.41/km^{2})
- Time zone: UTC-8 (Pacific (PST))
  - Summer (DST): UTC-7 (PDT)
- ZIP codes: 83833, 83842
- Area code: 208
- FIPS code: 16-35200
- GNIS feature ID: 2410708
- Website: www.cityofharrisonid.com

Harrison is a city in Kootenai County, Idaho, United States. The population was 233 at the 2020 census. Harrison is located on the eastern shore of Lake Coeur d'Alene, immediately south of where the Coeur d'Alene River flows into the lake.

== History ==
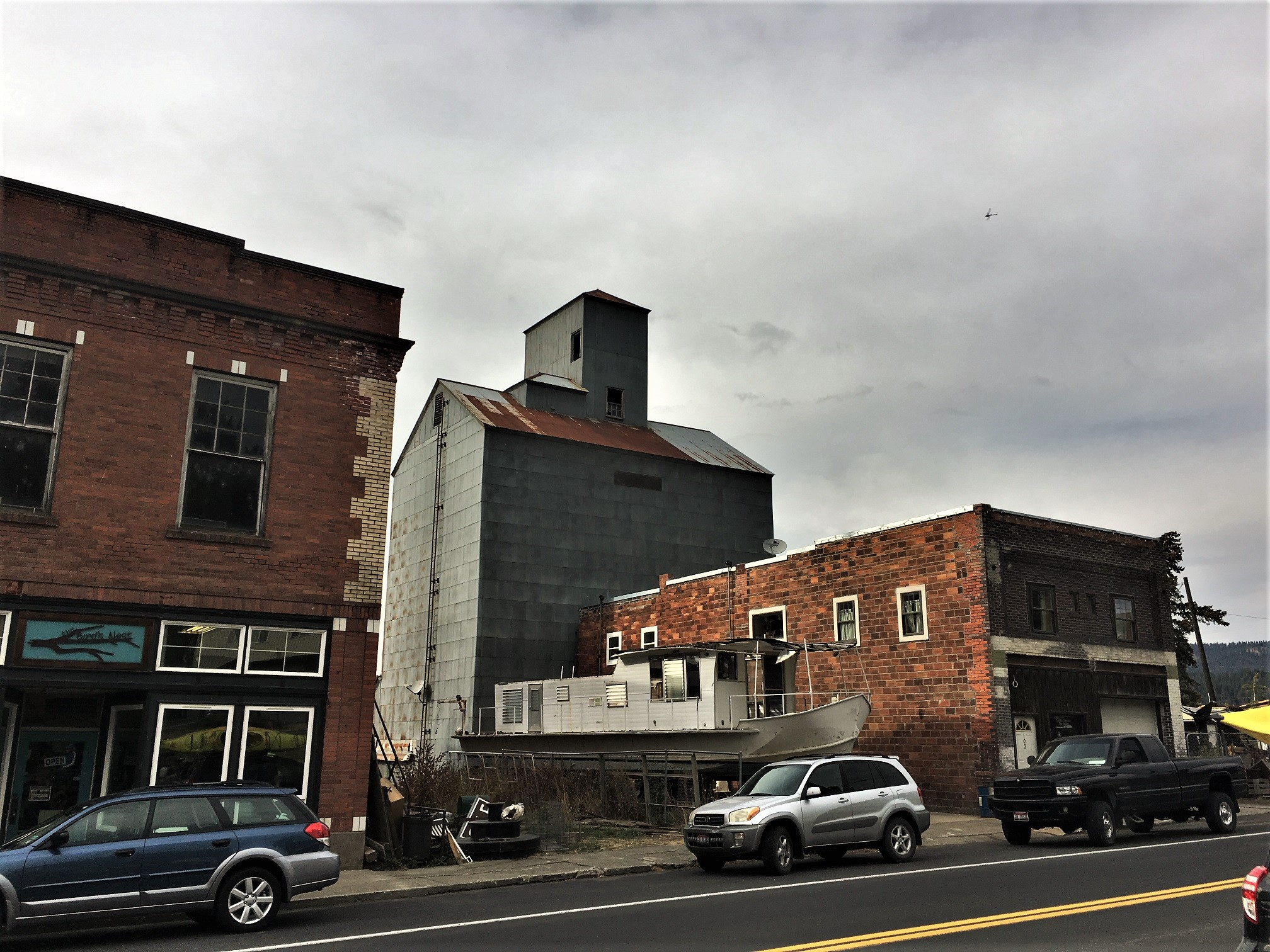
Harrison Commercial Historic District

Harrison was incorporated in 1899 and was once the largest city on Lake Coeur d'Alene. The community was named after President Benjamin Harrison.

Harrison developed from a squatters homestead to a thriving village in about twelve years. A branch of the O.R. & N. Railroad from Tekoa, Washington, to Harrison was completed in 1890 and was a prime factor in the development of Harrison.

In 1891, Silas W. Crane settled on a timbered tract which joins the present city on the south and east. He built the first house in Harrison which remained in the Crane family until 1936. The building is now used as the Crane House Museum. The same year Fred Grant purchased the Fisher Brothers Sawmill in St. Maries and moved it to Harrison. Known as Grants Mill, it had a capacity of 60 thousand feet per day.

In 1892, S.W. Crane opened a general store. The first post office was established in 1893, the name was chosen and W.E. Crane became the first postmaster. W.S. Bridgeman opened a Gen. Merc. in 1893, and another general store was opened in 1894 by W.A. Reiniger.

The first newspaper, The Signal, was established in 1895, later it was known as the Mountain Messenger and in 1900 became known as The Searchlight. A paper with that name is still published annually by the Oldtime Picnic Committee.

In 1895, a Methodist church was erected and School District #29 was formed. The first year of school was taught by Mr. Edelbute in the Methodist Church. The first school was erected in 1896 and by 1903 there were 59 students.

The original townsite was in the form of a triangle and covered approximately 23 acres (9.3 ha). The Village of Harrison was incorporated on July 21, 1899. The first meeting of the board of trustees for the Village of Harrison was held July 24, 1899. George W. Thompson was elected chairman.

In August 1905, a Spokane company was granted a franchise to put in a water system with a pumping plant at a cost of $20,000. An electric light plant was also installed in 1901 by Kimmel Brothers at a cost of $8,000.

The following year came the telephone, connecting Harrison with points up the Saint Joe and Coeur d'Alene rivers. Rocky Mountain Bell purchased the property later that year and Harrison was connected to the outside world.

The next few years saw the opening of the First National Bank of Harrison, the Opera House, various drug, grocery, hardware, furniture, clothing & jewelry stores along with tailoring, blacksmithing and shoemaker shops, and restaurants, hotels and a hospital. For a time around the turn of the century, Harrison was the largest town in Kootenai County; the city directory in 1911 reported a population of 1,250. Harrison's growth was a result of the development of eight or more sawmills & box factories. With the mills and woods jobs, approx. 280 men were employed with a combined monthly payroll around $25,000. Millions of board feet of timber were stored in the lake at Harrison. Lake Coeur d’Alene and the St. Joe and Coeur d’Alene rivers were the major transportation routes for timber coming out of the areas forests.

In 1917, the Grant Lumber Company caught fire and the ensuing blaze consumed about half of the residential area of Harrison and about half of the business district. Much of the town was never rebuilt. The easiest way to get to Harrison was by water. The OWR&N Company which absorbed the OR&N Railway, constructed a 600-passenger steamer called “The Harrison” for transportation. There were several other steamers such as the Georgie Oakes that carried passengers and freight making the depot a popular place for area children. Passenger service was discontinued in the early 1920s but they continued to haul freight until 1932 when the line was abandoned.

Many early day photos are on display at the Crane Historical Society Museum along with a lot of information about Harrison. Community spirit continues today with the Old Time Picnic, which is always held the last weekend in July.

Harrison's trail head for the Trail of the Coeur d'Alenes rail trail is a welcome addition to the area and helps to keep the town "alive" during the off season of lake traffic. The Trail is 72 miles (116 km) of easy riding and runs from Plummer to Mullan on the former right-of-way of the Union Pacific Railroad. In the mid-2010s, a Resort Condominiums International was constructed at Arrow Point on Lake Coeur d'Alene just north of town.

== Organizations ==
=== Churches ===
- Harrison Community Baptist Church
- Our Lady of Perpetual Help Catholic Church

=== Clubs ===
- Crane Historical Society
- Harrison Area Ball Fields Association
- Harrison Chamber of Commerce
- TOPS - Take Off Pounds Sensibly
- Harrison Grange #422
- Old Time Picnic Committee

== Geography ==
According to the United States Census Bureau, the city has a total area of 0.76 square miles (1.97 km^{2}), of which 0.69 square miles (1.79 km^{2}) is land and 0.07 square miles (0.18 km^{2}) is water.

Harrison is located 28 miles (45 km) south of Interstate 90 on the Lake Coeur d'Alene Scenic Byway, Highway 97.

The Coeur d'Alene River flows into Lake Coeur d'Alene on Harrison's northern edge. The lower reaches of the river's valley are filled with smaller lakes, and as such water dominates much of the local geography. The Saint Joe Mountains of the Bitterroot Range rise high above the flat lakes around Harrison.

== Demographics ==
Historical population
Census	Pop.	Note	%±
1900	702		—
1910	932		32.8%
1920	674		−27.7%
1930	493		−26.9%
1940	362		−26.6%
1950	322		−11.0%
1960	249		−22.7%
1970	249		0.0%
1980	260		4.4%
1990	226		−13.1%
2000	267		18.1%
2010	203		−24.0%
2020	233		14.8%
2019 (est.)	216		6.4%
U.S. Decennial Census

=== 2010 census ===
As of the census of 2010, there were 203 people, 100 households, and 54 families residing in the city. The population density was 294.2 inhabitants per square mile (113.6/km^{2}). There were 165 housing units at an average density of 239.1 units per square mile (92.3 units/km^{2}). The racial makeup of the city was 98.5% White and 1.5% Native American. Hispanic or Latino of any race were 2.0% of the population.

There were 100 households, of which 19.0% had children under the age of 18 living with them, 46.0% were married couples living together, 4.0% had a female householder with no husband present, 4.0% had a male householder with no wife present, and 46.0% were non-families. 37.0% of all households were made up of individuals, and 19% had someone living alone who was 65 years of age or older. The average household size was 2.03 and the average family size was 2.70.

The median age in the city was 52.6 years. 17.7% of residents were under the age of 18; 4.9% were between the ages of 18 and 24; 17.7% were from 25 to 44; 33.1% were from 45 to 64; and 26.6% were 65 years of age or older. The gender makeup of the city was 50.7% male and 49.3% female.

=== 2000 census ===
As of the census of 2000, there were 267 people, 124 households, and 77 families residing in the city. The population density was 646.4 inhabitants per square mile (249.6/km^{2}). There were 157 housing units at an average density of 380.1 units per square mile (146.8 units/km^{2}). The racial makeup of the city was 96.25% White, 0.75% Native American, 0.75% Asian, 0.37% from other races, and 1.87% from two or more races. Hispanic or Latino of any race were 1.12% of the population.

There were 124 households, out of which 21.0% had children under the age of 18 living with them, 51.6% were married couples living together, 8.9% had a female householder with no husband present, and 37.1% were non-families. 32.3% of all households were made up of individuals, and 17.7% had someone living alone who was 65 years of age or older. The average household size was 2.15 and the average family size was 2.71.

In the city, the population was spread out, with 21.7% under the age of 18, 3.7% from 18 to 24, 23.6% from 25 to 44, 31.5% from 45 to 64, and 19.5% who were 65 years of age or older. The median age was 46 years. For every 100 females, there were 93.5 males. For every 100 females age 18 and over, there were 85.0 males.

The median income for a household in the city was $35,750, and the median income for a family was $38,500. Males had a median income of $31,667 versus $26,563 for females. The per capita income for the city was $20,532. About 15.1% of families and 20.3% of the population were below the poverty line, including 53.4% of those under the age of eighteen and 17.0% of those 65 or over.
