= Coeur d'Alene River =

River in Idaho

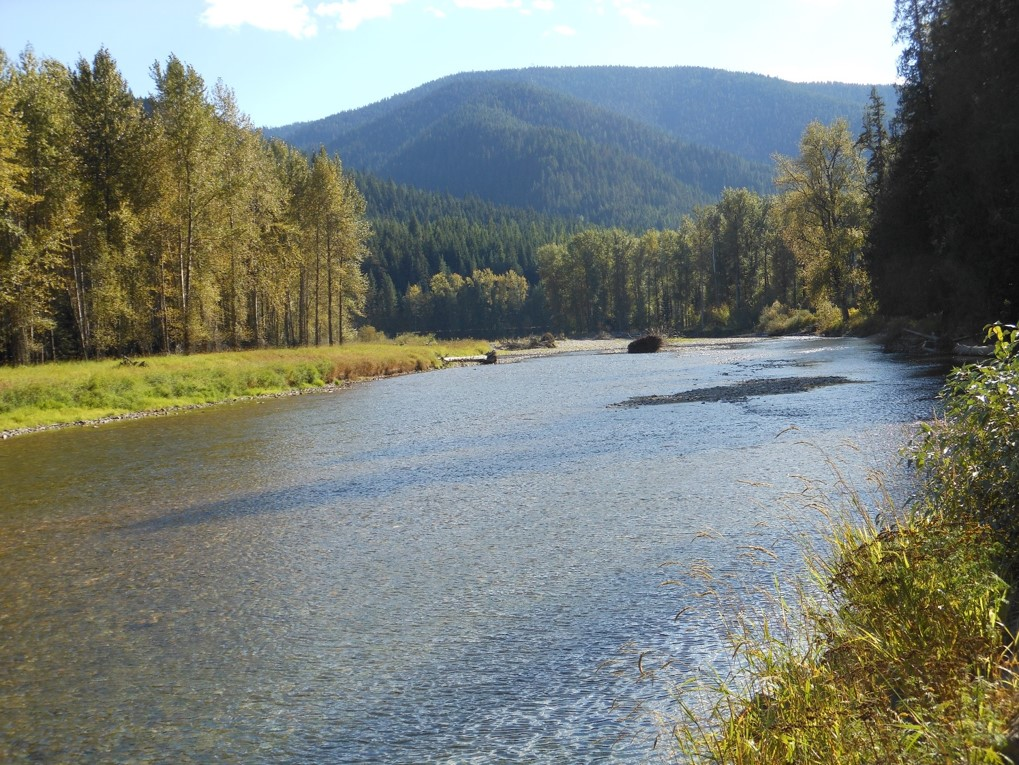
- The North Fork of the Coeur d'Alene River

- Location of the mouth of the Coeur d'Alene River in Idaho Coeur d'Alene River (the United States)

Location
- Country: United States
- State: Idaho

Physical characteristics
- Source: Confluence of North and South Forks
  - location: Pinehurst, Shoshone County
  - coordinates: 47°33′26″N 116°15′22″W
  - elevation: 2,172 ft (662 m)
- Mouth: Coeur d'Alene Lake
  - location: Harrison, Kootenai County
  - coordinates: 47°27′43″N 116°47′40″W
  - elevation: 2,129 ft (649 m)
- Length: 37 mi (60 km)
- Basin size: 1,453 sq mi (3,760 km^{2})
- Discharge
  - location: river mile 2.5 (RKM 4.0)
  - average: 2,521 cu ft/s (71.4 m^{3}/s)
  - minimum: 230 cu ft/s (6.5 m^{3}/s)
  - maximum: 27,300 cu ft/s (770 m^{3}/s)

Basin features
- Tributaries
  - left: South Fork Coeur d'Alene River, Latour Creek
  - right: North Fork Coeur d'Alene River

The Coeur d'Alene River flows 37 miles (60 km) from the Silver Valley into Lake Coeur d'Alene in the U.S. state of Idaho. The stream continues out of Lake Coeur d'Alene as the Spokane River.

Before the Bunker Hill Smelter in the Kellogg area, which mined lead and silver, was forced to adopt environmental controls in the 1970s, there was so much lead in the river in the Kellogg area the locals called the stream "Lead Creek".

Salmon levels continue to remain high in the area, and it is a popular destination for water-skiing, tubing, and swimming for locals.

All of the real bodies of water in the film Dante's Peak were either the Coeur d'Alene River or one of its tributaries, as Wallace, Idaho, where the movie was filmed, is in the Silver Valley.

Environmental concerns have come from upstream hard rock mining and smelting operations in the Silver Valley. The Coeur d'Alene Basin, including the Coeur d'Alene River, Lake Coeur d'Alene, and also the Spokane River is polluted with heavy metals such as lead and was designated a superfund site in 1983 that spans 1,500 square miles (3,884.98 km^{2}) and 166 miles (267 km) of the Coeur d'Alene River. The majority of the lake bed is covered in a layer of contaminated sediment and local health officials at the Panhandle Health District advise the lake's visitors to wash anything that has come into contact with potentially lead-laced soil or dust in the Coeur d'Alene River basin.

== See also ==
- List of tributaries of the Columbia River
- List of rivers of Idaho
