= Idaho State Highway 41 =

State highway in Idaho, United States

State Highway 41
- SH-41 highlighted in red

Route information
- Maintained by ITD and WSDOT
- Length: 39.058 mi (62.858 km) The Washington section is 0.41 mi (0.66 km) long
- Existed: 1931–present

Major junctions
- South end: I-90 in Post Falls, ID
- SH-53 in Rathdrum, ID; SH-54 in Spirit Lake, ID
- North end: US 2 in Oldtown, ID/Newport, WA

Location
- Country: United States
- States: Idaho, Washington
- Counties: ID: Kootenai, Bonner; WA: Pend Orielle

Highway system
- Idaho State Highway System; Interstate; US; State
← SH-40	→ SH-43
← SR 35	SR 41	→ I-82

State Highway 41 (SH-41) is a state highway mostly in the U.S. state of Idaho. It runs from Interstate 90 in Post Falls to U.S. Route 2 on the Washington state line. The northernmost 0.41 miles (0.66 km) of SH-41 run along State Street along the state line, with the southbound lane in the town of Newport, Washington, and the northbound lane in Oldtown, Idaho. The part of the highway in Washington is designated State Route 41 (SR 41).

== Route description ==
SH-41 begins at an interchange with I-90 in Post Falls, Idaho, with its southern ramps using East Seltice Way. The four-lane highway travels north through commercial and residential areas in the northeastern outskirts of Post Falls and reduces to two lanes beyond the city limits. SH-41 travels due north through the Rathdrum Prairie, a rural area with several farms, and crosses the Union Pacific Railroad's Spokane Subdivision via an overpass. The highway then enters the city of Rathdrum and turns northeast, passing residential neighborhoods and several schools. It then turns north to form a short concurrency with SH-53 and cross over the BNSF Railway's Kootenai River Subdivision on a four-lane overpass. SH-53 splits from the concurrency near a shopping center to travel west towards Spokane, Washington, while SH-41 turns northeast to leave Rathdrum.

The highway travels north towards Spirit Lake along Rathdrum Creek and the eastern shore of Twin Lakes on the outskirts of the Selkirk Mountains. Near the city's eponymous lake, SH-41 intersects SH-54, a connector highway that travels east to Athol and Lake Pend Oreille. The highway travels north through the city of Spirit Lake on 5th Avenue, where it passes a commercial district, and continues northwest into Bonner County. SH-41 turns west to follow Spirit Valley, which divides two arms of the Selkirk Mountains, and passes through the community of Blanchard at the head of another valley. The highway gradually turns north and passes several disconnected sections of the Kaniksu National Forest as it follows the Idaho–Washington state border.

SH-41 then turns northwest and descends into the city of Oldtown, Idaho, overlooking the Pend Oreille River. The highway turns north onto State Avenue and travels for several blocks on the Idaho–Washington state border with its northbound lanes in Oldtown, Idaho, and its southbound lanes in neighboring Newport, Washington, where it is designated as Washington State Route 41 (SR 41). SH-41/SR 41 travels over the Pend Oreille Valley Railroad and through an industrial area before it terminates at an intersection with US 2.

The highway is 39 miles (63 km) long and serves as a western alternative to US 95. The Idaho Transportation Department (ITD) maintains all of SH-41 within Idaho, while the Washington State Department of Transportation (WSDOT) maintains the southbound lanes of the 0.41-mile (0.66 km) section that lies in Washington. Both agencies conduct annual surveys of traffic on segments of the freeway, the results of which are expressed in terms of annual average daily traffic, a measure of traffic volume for any average day of the year. Average traffic volumes in 2019 ranged from a minimum of 2,800 vehicles between Blanchard and Oldtown to a maximum of 26,000 vehicles at the I-90 interchange in Post Falls. The section on the Idaho–Washington state border averaged between 4,400 and 5,000 vehicles in 2019.

== History ==
The Spirit Lake Highway was added to the Idaho state highway system on May 4, 1931, and designated as State Highway 41. The southernmost 6.4 miles (10.3 km) between Ross Point and Rathdrum were paved and oiled by the state government in 1932 with grants from the federal government.

The Post Falls–Coeur d'Alene section of I-90 opened in October 1970 and included an interchange with SH-41 adjacent to its existing terminus at US 10 (now Seltice Way) and Ross Point Road. The interchange was rebuilt in the late 1980s to route offramp traffic onto Seltice Way in response to collisions at the closely spaced intersections at the interchange. The state government also added several traffic signals to SH-41 between Seltice Way and Mullan Avenue in 1994 to address increased traffic.

The Washington side of State Avenue, which straddles the state border between Newport, Washington, and Oldtown, Idaho, was originally designated as part of US 2. A separate state highway was created in 1997 by the Washington state legislature and was numbered SR 41 to match the Idaho highway.

Local governments have proposed the expansion of SH-41 between Post Falls and Rathdrum to a four-lane divided highway since the 1990s, drawing opposition from nearby residents. Alternative plans, including upgrading parallel roads to handle higher-speed traffic, were considered by the Kootenai Metropolitan Planning Organization in the 2000s but later rejected. A 6-mile (9.7 km) section of the SH-41 corridor was later approved for widening in the late 2010s, with $121 million allocated for construction. Construction began in 2020 and the widened highway with new traffic signals, a wide median, and a railroad overpass is scheduled to fully open in 2022; a new offset single-point urban interchange with I-90 is also planned to begin construction in 2023. Funds to widen an additional section were part of a proposed vehicle registration fee increase that was rejected by Kootenai County voters in 2020.

== Major intersections ==
State	County	Location	mi	km	Destinations	Notes
Idaho	Kootenai	Post Falls	0.000	0.000	Seltice Way / Ross Point Road	Southern terminus; road continues as Ross Point Rd.
Idaho	Kootenai	Post Falls	0.030	0.048	I-90 – Coeur d'Alene, Spokane	Interchange
Idaho	Kootenai	Rathdrum	7.720	12.424	SH-53 east – Sandpoint	South end of SH-53 overlap
Idaho	Kootenai	Rathdrum	7.900	12.714	SH-53 west – Spokane	North end of SH-53 overlap
Idaho	Kootenai	Spirit Lake	18.134	29.184	SH-54 east – Athol	
Idaho–Washington line	Bonner–Pend Oreille county line	Oldtown–Newport line	38.660	62.217	State Avenue / SR 41 begins	Southern terminus of SR 41; south end of SR 41 overlap
Idaho–Washington line	Bonner–Pend Oreille county line	Oldtown–Newport line	39.058	62.858	SR 41 ends / US 2 west (Walnut Street) – Newport City Center US 2 east – Priest River, Sandpoint	Northern terminus; north end of SR 41 overlap; road continues as State Avenue
1.000 mi = 1.609 km; 1.000 km = 0.621 mi: Concurrency terminus
