= Timberlake High School =

Location
- 5303 West Highway 54; Spirit Lake, Idaho; United States; 47.954°N 116.865°W

Information
- Type: Public
- Founded: 1998
- School district: Lakeland J.S.D. (#272)
- NCES School ID: 160180000843
- Principal: Ryne Eberlin
- Staff: 31.00 (FTE)
- Grades: 9–12
- Enrollment: 530 (2023–2024)
- Student to teacher ratio: 17.10
- Colors: Navy Blue & Gold
- Athletics: IHSAA Class 3A
- Athletics conference: Intermountain League
- Mascot: Tiger
- Newspaper: Tiger Tales
- Elevation: 2,560 ft (780 m) AMSL
- Website: ths.sd272.org

Timberlake High School is a four-year public secondary school in Spirit Lake, Idaho. Opened in 1998 at the south end of town, it is the second high school in the Lakeland Joint School District #272 of northern Kootenai County and draws its students from Spirit Lake, Athol, Bayview, and Twin Lakes. The school colors are navy blue, gold, and white, and its mascot is the white tiger.

Timberlake originally was six grades and included grades 7 and 8; a separate junior high was built on the north end of the campus and opened in 2004.

== History ==
The Lakeland Joint School District was formed in 1948 by consolidating 13 smaller districts; In 1962, the high schools in Spirit Lake and Rathdrum were consolidated into the new Lakeland High School in Rathdrum. A new Lakeland campus was constructed in 1979 and high enrollment in the district in the 1990s led to the construction of Timberlake.

== Athletics ==
Timberlake competes in athletics in IHSAA Class 3A and is a member of the Intermountain League with Bonners Ferry, Priest River, and Kellogg.

=== State titles ===
==== Boys ====
- Basketball (1): (B) 1942 (as Spirit Lake H.S.)
- Track (3): (3A) 2004, 2006, 2007

==== Girls ====
- Cross Country (3): fall (3A) 2009, 2010, 2011
- Track (1): (3A) 2011
- Basketball (1): (3A) 2016

Individual

- Men’s Wrestling (285 lbs.): David Howard
- Men’s Wrestling (140 lbs.) David Hayes
- Men's Wrestling (285 lbs.): Dylan White
- Men's Wrestling (126 lbs.): Caleb Miller
- Men's Wrestling (182 lbs.): Joey Follini
