= Idaho State Highway 54 =

State highway in Kootenai County, Idaho, United States

State Highway 54
- SH-54 highlighted in red

Route information
- Maintained by ITD
- Length: 15.510 mi (24.961 km)

Major junctions
- West end: SH-41 in Spirit Lake
- US 95 near Athol
- East end: Hudson Bay Road in Bayview

Location
- Country: United States
- State: Idaho
- County: Kootenai

Highway system
- Idaho State Highway System; Interstate; US; State
← SH-53	→ SH-55

State Highway 54 (SH-54) is a 15.510-mile-long (24.961 km) state highway in Kootenai County, Idaho, United States, that connects Idaho State Highway 41 (SH-41) in Spirit Lake with Hudson Bay Road and North Main Avenue in Bayview.

== Route description ==
SH-54 begins at an intersection with SH-41 on the southern edge of Spirit Lake. The route travels east out of the city, passing by Timberlake High School. SH-54 passed through the city of Athol, with a diamond interchange with U.S. Route 95 immediately thereafter. At Smylie Boulevard, the road continues east, turning northeast at a circular intersection with Good Hope Road, where it enters Farragut State Park. SH-54 continues near Lake Pend Oreille, where it turns north into the town of Bayview. The road makes a brief turn to the east before terminating at Hudson Bay Road and North Main Avenue near the shores of Scenic Bay.

== Major intersections ==
The entire route is in Kootenai County.

Location	mi	km	Destinations	Notes
Spirit Lake	0.000	0.000	SH-41 – Rathdrum, Spirit Lake, Newport	Western terminus
	7.900	12.714	US 95 – Sandpoint, Coeur d'Alene	Interchange
Bayview	15.510	24.961	Hudson Bay Road south	Eastern terminus; continues as North Main Avenue
1.000 mi = 1.609 km; 1.000 km = 0.621 mi

== See also ==
- List of state highways in Idaho

== See also ==
Media related to Idaho State Highway 54 at Wikimedia Commons
