= U.S. Route 95 in Idaho =

Section of U.S. Highway in Idaho, United States

U.S. Highway 95
- North and South Highway
- US-95 highlighted in red

Route information
- Maintained by ITD
- Length: 538.562 mi (866.732 km)
- Existed: November 11, 1926–present
- Tourist routes: Part of the International Selkirk Loop

Major junctions
- South end: US 95 at the Oregon state line north of Jordan Valley, OR
- SH-55 west of Marsing; US 20 / US 26 from Parma to Nyssa, OR; I-84 / US 30 in Fruitland; SH-55 in New Meadows; US 12 east of Lewiston; US 195 north of Lewiston; I-90 in Coeur d'Alene; US 2 from Sandpoint to Bonners Ferry
- North end: Highway 95 at the Canadian border in Eastport

Location
- Country: United States
- State: Idaho
- Counties: Owyhee, Canyon, Payette, Washington, Adams, Idaho, Lewis, Nez Perce, Latah, Benewah, Kootenai, Bonner, Boundary

Highway system
- United States Numbered Highway System; List; Special; Divided; Idaho State Highway System; Interstate; US; State
| ← US 93 | → SH-97 |

In the U.S. state of Idaho, U.S. Route 95 (US 95) is a north–south highway near the western border of the state, stretching from Oregon to British Columbia for over 538 miles (866 km); it was earlier known in the state as the North and South Highway.

As indicated by its original name, it is the primary north–south highway in Idaho; US 95 connects the Boise metropolitan area in southwestern Idaho with the small cities of Fruitland, Payette, Weiser and New Meadows within the Mountain Time Zone portion of the state. North of the Salmon River where it enters the Pacific Time Zone, US 95 provides an important link to the cities of Grangeville (via SH 13), Lewiston (via US 12) and directly serves Moscow, Coeur d'Alene, Sandpoint and Bonners Ferry before reaching the Canadian border at its northern terminus and continuing into the province of British Columbia as Highway 95. It is also the only road to connect the Idaho Panhandle with the rest of the state.

== Route description ==
US 95 continues into Idaho from southeastern Oregon as an undivided two-lane highway for the majority of its length. As it is the state's primary north–south highway, Idaho is in the process of widening US 95 to an Interstate-style divided four-lane highway from the Oregon state line in the southwest to Eastport at the northern border with Canada at Kingsgate, British Columbia.

In Oregon, US 95 continues south, crosses into Nevada in McDermitt and meets Interstate 80 in Winnemucca.

=== Oregon border to New Meadows ===
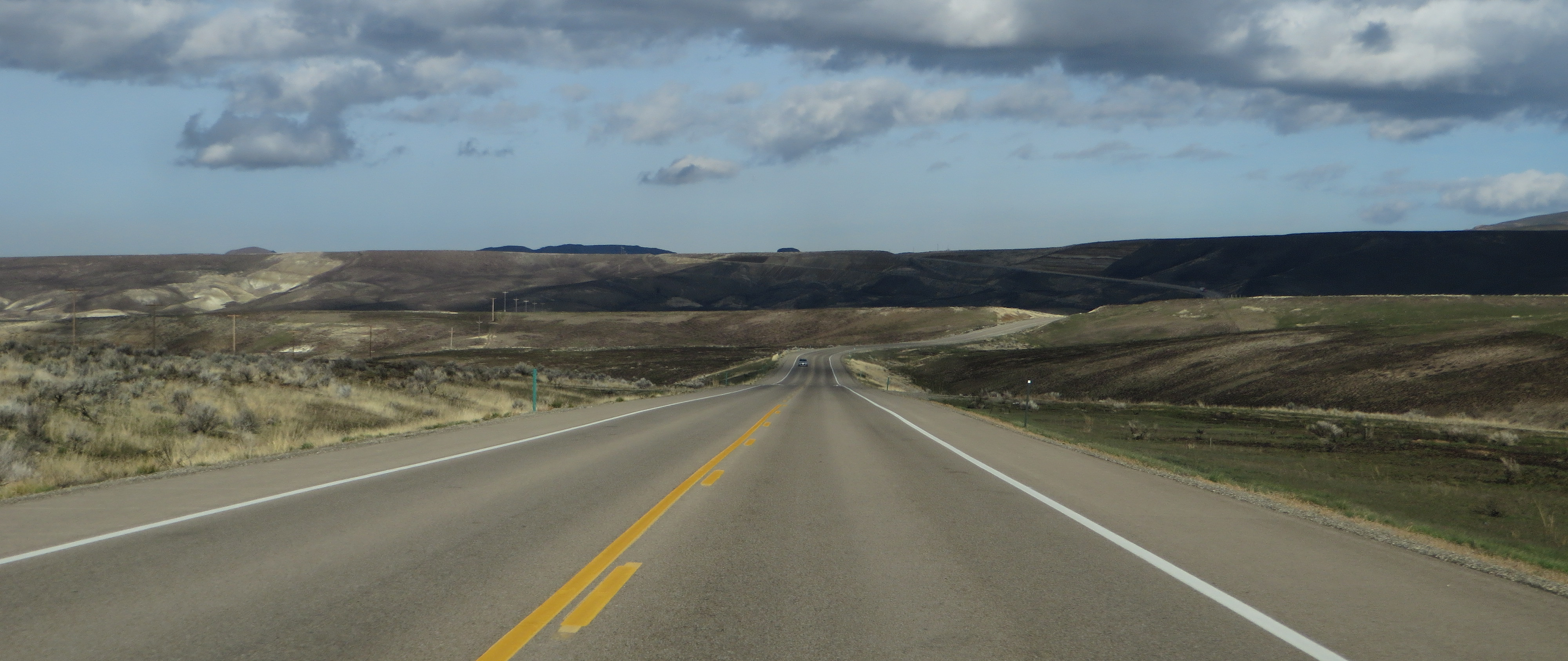
US 95 northbound between Jordan Valley, Oregon and Marsing, Idaho

US 95 departs Malheur County, Oregon and enters Idaho in the high desert of Owyhee County, about fifty miles (80 km) southwest of Boise. It progresses north-northeast to just west of Marsing where it meets with the southern terminus of State Highway 55. US 95 then turns briefly west, then north to Homedale and crosses the Snake River before a junction with concurrent US 20 and US 26 as it passes through Parma. US 95 runs north concurrent with US 20/26 for eight miles (13 km).

As it proceeds north near Idaho's western border, US 95 crosses Interstate 84 (exit 3) and US 30 before proceeding north through Payette and Weiser. It continues on to Midvale, Cambridge and Council then climbs into the Payette National Forest, passing the Tamarack sawmill site and turns east to New Meadows. Here, US 95 joins with Highway 55, the two-lane undivided route that connects to Boise through McCall, Cascade and Horseshoe Bend. The elevation at the junction in New Meadows is 3,865 feet (1,178 m) above sea level.

=== Meadows Valley to Lewiston ===
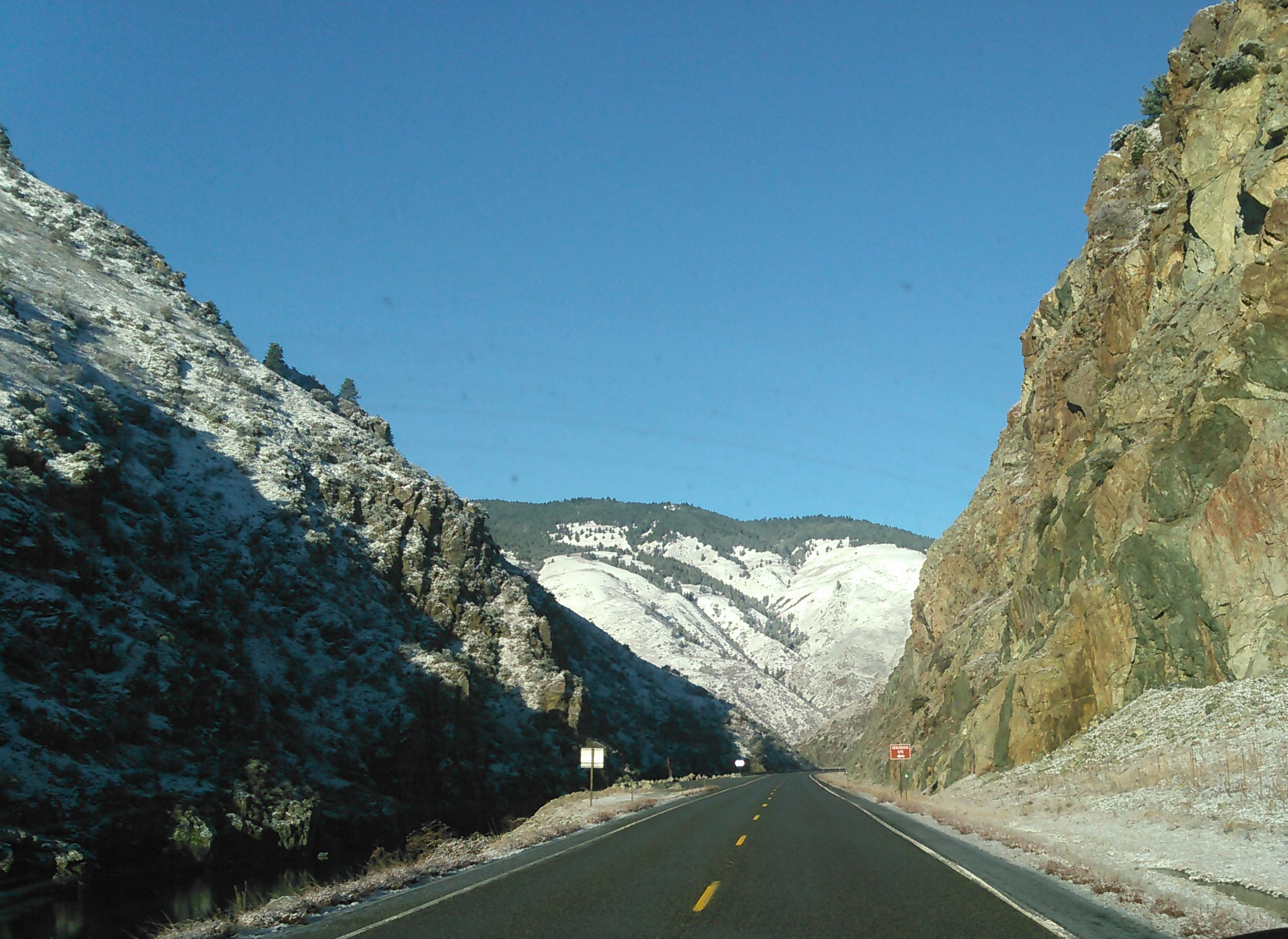
Geographical information site including Salmon River (left side) on US 95 northbound between Riggins and White Bird

US 95 continues north through Meadows Valley north of the junction, then descends 2,000 feet (610 m) with the Little Salmon River to Riggins, tree-sparse but surrounded by mile-high mountains (vertical drop). Immediately after Riggins, the highway crosses the main Salmon River, crossing from the Mountain Time Zone to the Pacific Time Zone; the current tied-arch Goff Bridge was completed in 1999, replacing the truss edition of 1936; the original bridge was built in 1911 and moved to Stites in 1936.

Northbound US 95 gradually descends with the widening river, crossing it two more times (re-entering the Mountain Time Zone and leaving it within a half-mile) until White Bird where it climbs 2,700 vertical feet (825 m) in seven miles (11 km) to the cut at the top of White Bird Hill, peaking at an elevation of 4,245 feet (1,294 m) with an average gradient of over 7%. The steeper, straighter and faster multi-lane grade was opened in 1975 after ten challenging years of construction. The two-lane road of 1921 to the east was first paved in 1938; it left the Salmon River at White Bird Creek following it up through the town of White Bird and then gradually climbed the grade in twice the distance with multiple switchback curves. The arcs, if combined, would form 37 full 360° circles, an average of 950° per mile (590° per km). Following the completion of the new steel bridge over White Bird Creek, the new routing opened in June 1975, ending a decade of construction. The new Lewiston grade to the north was finished in just over two years.

North of the summit, US 95 descends in a steep but relatively short descent to the Camas Prairie and Grangeville at 3,390 feet (1,030 m). The highway then travels northwest towards Cottonwood, whose bypass was finished in 1976, then enters the Nez Perce Indian Reservation. New route construction in the early 1990s bypassed the main streets of Ferdinand and Craigmont. The new routing is now above, rather than in, the curvy Lawyers Creek Canyon between the cities, crossing the canyon on an elevated 900-foot (270 m) bridge constructed in 1991. Lawyers Canyon is named after Chief Lawyer (c.1801–76) of the Nez Perce, nicknamed for his skill in dealing with the encroaching whites; he is buried in Kamiah. US 95 winds its way westward across the high prairie near the many timber railroad trestles of the Camas Prairie Railroad, to just east of Winchester. Here, at just under 4,000 feet (1,220 m), the highway turns northward and descends over 3,000 vertical feet (900 m), mostly in the Lapwai Canyon, passing Culdesac, Lapwai and Spalding at 807 feet (246 m).

Until 1960, US 95 was routed through Winchester and descended Culdesac Hill, considered the worst of the three major grades (White Bird, Lewiston), all of which were extremely twisty. The new route through Lapwai Canyon was built in three years and reduced the distance by over four miles (6 km) and saved 25 minutes of driving time. After Spalding, it then proceeds towards the bridge over the Clearwater River to join with US 12 and depart the reservation. The current bridge for US 12 upstream at Arrow replaced the old Spalding bridge in 1973; ice jams on the river a decade earlier shifted it.

After crossing the Clearwater on the new Spalding bridge (1962), US 95 joins with US 12 for seven miles (11 km) along its north bank, heading westward, adding lanes and gradually descending toward Lewiston. About midway along the co-sign, the reservation is departed; the highways split several miles later at Lewiston's northeast edge. US 12 briefly turns south to re-cross the river into the city center and then west to cross the Snake River into Clarkston, Washington.

=== Lewiston grade to Canada ===
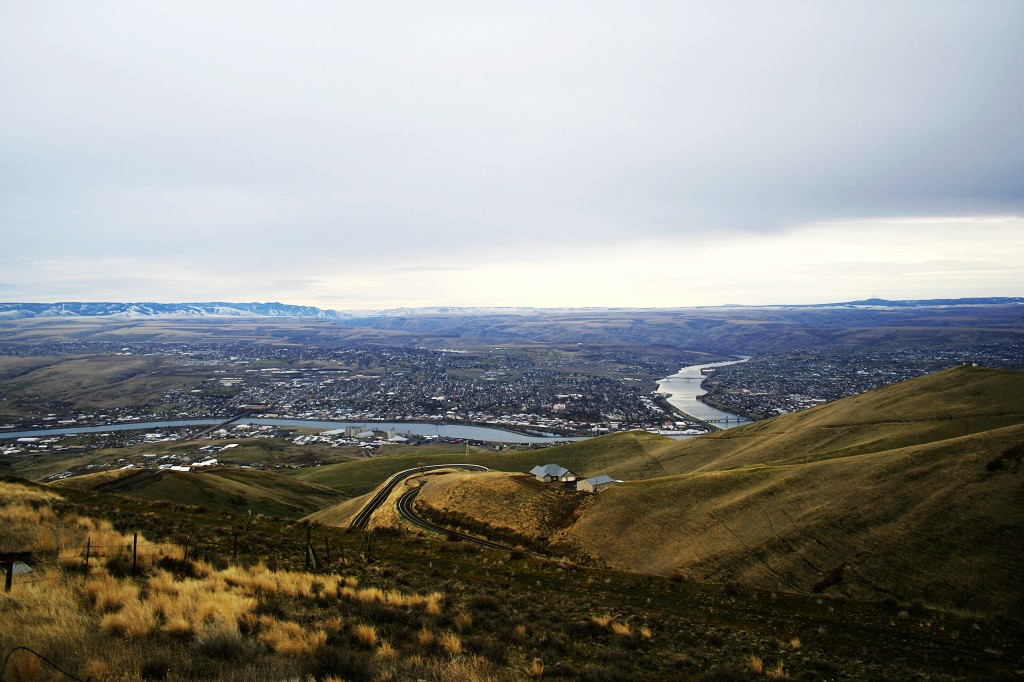
Lewiston and Clarkston, WA (old grade in foreground)

US 95 turns northeast, then westward to climb a steep grade, gaining over 1,900 feet (580 m) in five miles (8 km), ascending to the southern edge of the rolling Palouse region, referred to by many locals as the "Lewiston Hill". The multi-lane grade (averaging over 7%) was opened on October 28, 1977, after 27 months of construction and two decades of planning. It replaced the Lewiston Spiral Highway, a narrow and switchback-laden 1917 route to the west with 64 spiral curves and about twice the length; it is visible from a scenic overlook. Similar to the White Bird Hill grade, the descending southbound lanes on the new route have three "runaway truck ramps" to halt any vehicles that experience brake failure.

Just north of the Lewiston grade is a junction with US 195, which proceeds north in Washington to Pullman and Spokane. US 95 continues north in Idaho on the Palouse as a four-lane divided highway (roadcam), completed in October 2007 to Thorn Creek Road, midway between Genesee and Moscow. In October 2025, the remaining section of divided highway to Moscow, home of the University of Idaho, was completed. Scheduled to be completed first, the divided highway construction between Thorn Creek and Moscow was put on hold, due to new right-of-way and environmental impact concerns. The legacy portion from Thorn Creek to Moscow became Riesenauer Road.

In Moscow, US 95 is diverted a block to either side of Main Street onto multi-lane one-way arterials: northbound on Washington Street, southbound on Jackson Street. The original couplets of 1981 used existing streets and were later modified to eliminate sharp right angle turns which were difficult for large trucks to safely manage. The north end couplets were completed in the early 1990s, the south end in 2000. The construction on the northeast couplet forced the demolition of a noted Moscow watering hole's original west end in January 1991, after staving off its elimination for over a decade.

North of Moscow, US 95 resumes as an undivided two-lane highway. As it leaves Latah County, it gradually departs the Palouse and enters the lake country region of the north Panhandle. As it enters Benewah County, US 95 enters the Coeur d'Alene Indian Reservation. US 95 intersects State Highway 5 in Plummer. US 95 becomes a four-lane divided highway as it leaves Worley and has an interchange with State Highway 58. This recently completed section bypasses the tribal casino and its Circling Raven golf course. US 95 continues north as a divided highway until just south of the Spokane River, where US 95 enters downtown Coeur d'Alene.

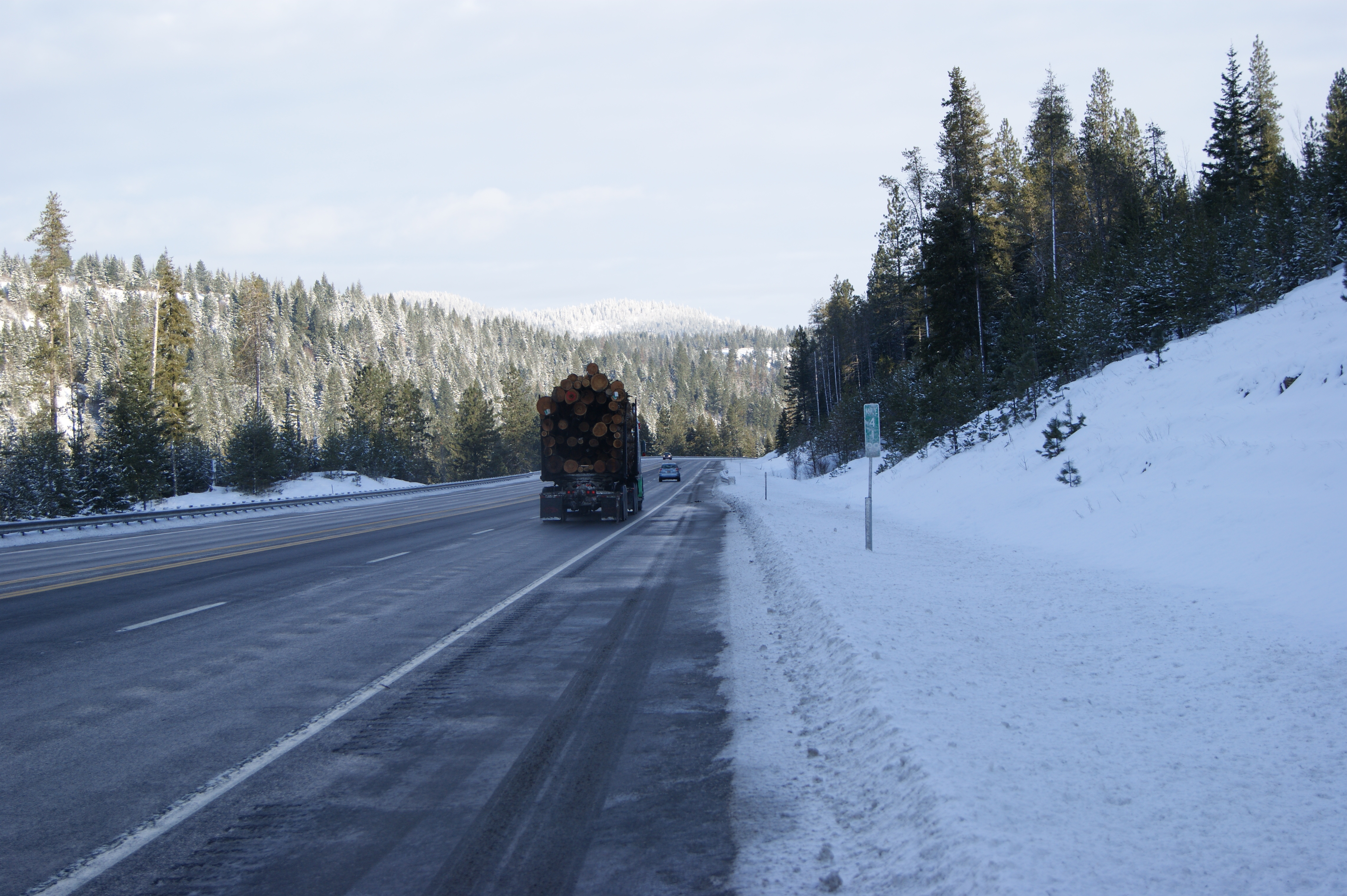
US 95 northbound at mile marker 419.9 south of Coeur d'Alene

US 95 becomes an arterial street and crosses over Interstate 90 Business (Northwest Boulevard) at an interchange. US 95 crosses Interstate 90 at exit 12 and becomes a divided highway north to Hayden, then as an undivided highway past State Highway 54 and Farragut State Park. After crossing Lake Pend Oreille on the 1.1-mile (1.8 km) Sandpoint Long Bridge, US 95 enters Sandpoint and has a junction with US 2. The two routes run concurrent for 35 miles (56 km), until a few miles after Bonners Ferry, where US 2 heads east into Montana and southeast to Libby, while US 95 continues north for 29 miles (47 km) to the Canadian border in Eastport. At the border, US 95 meets BC 95, which continues northeastward in British Columbia to Cranbrook.

In 2019, ITD had started a construction project at US 95's intersection with State Highway 53 to reconfigure the intersection, replaced the current signalized intersection with single-point urban interchange. The project straightened out SH-53 over the nearby train tracks, removed an intersection with Garwood Road with a new bridge and extended the frontage road on the east side to Garwood Road.

== History ==
US 95 was established on November 11, 1926 as one of the original routes in the American Association of State Highway and Transportation Officials (AASHTO) system of national highways. It originally terminated at U.S. Route 30 north of Parma near the Oregon state line and was wholly located within Idaho except for a small segment in Washington state northwest of Lewiston. Prior to the designation, the north–south highway was part of State Highway 24 (the number has since re-purposed for another highway).

An auxiliary route, numbered US 95E, was established in 1927 between Potlatch and Coeur d'Alene and later replaced by US 95 Alternate. A proposal to extend US 95 south was considered by AASHTO in 1937, but deferred until January 1, 1940, while routes in Oregon were improved. US 95 then was extended through Oregon and Nevada to California, terminating in Blythe.

Since the 1990s, sections of the highway between Coeur d'Alene and Sandpoint have been widened to four lanes and gained limited-access grade separation.

== Future ==

A proposal to expand the freeway sections of US 95 into a full-fledged Interstate Highway which would be numbered as Interstate 11 is considered by both federal and state government officials since 1987.

== Major intersections ==
| County | Location | mi | km | Exit | Destinations | Notes |
|---|---|---|---|---|---|---|
| Owyhee | | 0.000 | 0.000 | | US 95 south – Jordan Valley | Continuation into Oregon |
| Owyhee | | 26.266 | 42.271 | | SH-55 north – Boise, Nampa | |
| Owyhee | Homedale | 34.166 | 54.985 | | SH-19 west | |
| Canyon | Wilder | 38.429 | 61.845 | | SH-19 east to I-84 – Caldwell | |
| Canyon | | 45.509 | 73.240 | | US 20 east / US 26 east – Boise | Southern end of US 20 / US 26 concurrency |
| Canyon | | 53.557 | 86.192 | | US 20 west / US 26 west – Nyssa, Ontario | Northern end of US 20 / US 26 concurrency |
| Payette | | 60.815– 60.874 | 97.872– 97.967 | | I-84 – Boise, Ontario, Portland | Interchange; I-84 exit 3 |
| Payette | | 61.078 | 98.296 | | US 30 east – Boise | Southern end of US 30 concurrency |
| Payette | Fruitland | 65.035 | 104.664 | | US 30 west to I-84 – Ontario, Portland | Northern end of US 30 concurrency |
| Payette | Payette | 67.242 | 108.216 | | Main Street (US 95 Spur north) to SH-52 west | Former alignment of US 95 |
| Payette | Payette | 68.372 | 110.034 | | SH-52 – Emmett | |
| Washington | Weiser | 81.752 | 131.567 | | E. Main Street (US 95 Spur) | |
| Washington | Cambridge | 113.300 | 182.339 | | SH-71 north (Hells Canyon Scenic Byway) – Brownlee Dam | |
| Adams | New Meadows | 160.934 | 258.998 | | SH-55 south (Payette River Scenic Byway) – Cascade Dam | Mountain Time Zone |
| Idaho | Grangeville | 239.782 | 385.892 | | SH-13 north – Kooskia | Crosses the time zone boundary three times in Idaho County (between Riggins and White Bird); Grangeville is in Pacific Time Zone |
| Nez Perce | | 304.388– 304.535 | 489.865– 490.102 | — | US 12 east – Orofino, Missoula | Interchange; southern end of US 12 concurrency |
| Nez Perce | Lewiston | 312.219– 312.266 | 502.468– 502.543 | — | US 12 west – Lewiston, Walla Walla | Interchange; northern end of US 12 concurrency |
| Nez Perce | | 318.661– 319.112 | 512.835– 513.561 | — | US 195 north – Pullman, Spokane | Interchange; northbound exit and southbound entrance; former US 95 north |
| Nez Perce | | 319.605 | 514.354 | | US 95 Spur to US 195 – Pullman, Spokane, Uniontown | US 95 Spur unsigned; former US 95 south |
| Latah | Moscow | 344.885 | 555.039 | | SH-8 east – Troy | Southern end of SH-8 concurrency |
| Latah | Moscow | 345.349 | 555.785 | | SH-8 west – Pullman | Northern end of SH-8 concurrency |
| Latah | | 354.634 | 570.728 | | SH-66 west – Palouse | |
| Latah | | 360.554 | 580.255 | | SH-6 west – Palouse | Southern end of SH-6 concurrency |
| Latah | | 361.724 | 582.138 | | SH-6 east – Potlatch | Northern end of SH-6 concurrency |
| Benewah | | 387.502 | 623.624 | | SH-60 west – Willard, Tekoa | |
| Benewah | Plummer | 395.877 | 637.102 | | SH-5 south to SH-3 – St. Maries | |
| Kootenai | | 406.764– 407.259 | 654.623– 655.420 | — | SH-58 west – Spokane, CDA Casino and Resort | Interchange |
| Kootenai | Coeur d'Alene | 429.612– 429.748 | 691.393– 691.612 | | I-90 BL – Downtown Coeur d'Alene | Interchange, former US 10 |
| Kootenai | Coeur d'Alene | 430.558– 430.660 | 692.916– 693.080 | | I-90 – Spokane, Kellogg | Interchange; I-90 exit 12 |
| Kootenai | | 438.880 | 706.309 | 439 | SH-53 south – Rathdrum, Garwood | Interchange |
| Kootenai | | 441.529– 442.283 | 710.572– 711.785 | 442 | Chilco Road / Ohio Match Road | Interchange |
| Kootenai | | 445.873 | 717.563 | 446 | Brunner Road / Bunco Road — Silverwood | Interchange |
| Kootenai | Athol | 448.692– 449.408 | 722.100– 723.252 | 449 | SH-54 west – Athol, Bayview, Farragut State Park | Interchange |
| Bonner | Sandpoint | 473.589– 474.127 | 762.168– 763.033 | 473 | Sandpoint | Interchange; no northbound entrance |
| Bonner | Ponderay | 475.026– 475.325 | 764.480– 764.961 | — | US 2 west / SH-200 east (Pend Oreille Scenic Byway) – Kootenai, Clark Fork, Sandpoint | Interchange; southern end of US 2 concurrency |
| Boundary | | 510.370 | 821.361 | | US 2 east – Kalispell, Glacier National Park | Northern end of US 2 concurrency |
| Boundary | | 521.862 | 839.855 | | SH-1 north – Porthill, Creston | |
| Boundary | Eastport | 538.562 | 866.732 | Eastport–Kingsgate Border Crossing at the Canada–United States border | | |
| Boundary | Eastport | 538.562 | 866.732 | | Highway 95 north – Cranbrook | Continuation into British Columbia |
1.000 mi = 1.609 km; 1.000 km = 0.621 mi: Concurrency terminus; Incomplete access

== See also ==
=== Special routes ===
- U.S. Route 95 Alternate: current state highways 6, 3 and 97 from Coeur d'Alene to Potlatch
- U.S. Route 95 Spur (Weiser, Idaho)
- U.S. Route 95 Spur (Payette, Idaho)

=== Related routes ===
- U.S. Route 195
- U.S. Route 95E
- U.S. Route 95W

U.S. Route 95
| Previous state: Oregon | Idaho | Next state: Terminus |
