= Idaho State Highway 53 =

State highway serving Kootenai County in the U.S. state of Idaho

State Highway 53
- SH-53 highlighted in red

Route information
- Maintained by ITD
- Length: 14.240 mi (22.917 km)
- Existed: 1953–present

Major junctions
- West end: SR 290 at Washington state border
- SH-41 in Rathdrum
- East end: US 95 near Hayden

Location
- Country: United States
- State: Idaho
- Counties: Kootenai

Highway system
- Idaho State Highway System; Interstate; US; State
← SH-52	→ SH-54

State Highway 53 (SH-53) is a 14.240-mile-long (22.917 km) state highway serving Kootenai County in the U.S. state of Idaho. SH-53 travels northeast from Washington State Route 290 (SR 290) at the Washington state border near Hauser to a short concurrency with SH-41 in Rathdrum. From Rathdrum, the highway continues east to end at U.S. Route 95 (US-95) north of Hayden. The Hauser to Rathdrum segment first appeared on a map in 1926, while the continuation of the route to the Hayden area appeared in 1937, completing an unnumbered state highway. SH-53 was designated in 1953 after all unnumbered state highways were assigned numbers.

== Route description ==
SH-53 begins at the Washington state border southwest of Hauser at the eastern terminus of Washington State Route 290, which serves Spokane, Washington. Trent Road travels northeast, paralleling the Burlington Northern Santa Fe railroad through farmland and several small suburban communities towards Rathdrum. The highway serves the northern area of the city, passing strip malls and businesses, to an intersection with SH-41. At the intersection, SH-53 turns southeast and begins a short concurrency with SH-41 to cross the railroad via an overpass. The highway splits from SH-41 near Lakeland High School and travels due east through a commercial district. From the commercial district, the roadway travels towards farmland and sharply turns north before cutting back southeast over a UPRR railroad line. After the overpass, SH-53 ends at a signalized intersection with US-95 north of Hayden. The Idaho Transportation Department has plans to straighten the east end of the highway and replace the signalized intersection with an interchange by the end of 2020.

== History ==
SH-53 first appeared as a roadway from Hauser to Rathdrum in a 1926 map of Idaho. By 1937, the road was extended east to US-95 north of Hayden and became an unnumbered state highway. The highway was officially designated as SH-53 after a meeting of the Idaho Board of Highway Directors on July 25, 1953 that approved a number for all unnumbered state highways.

== Major intersections ==
The entire route is in Kootenai County.

Location	mi	km	Destinations	Notes
	0.000	0.000	SR 290 west (Trent Avenue) – Spokane	Washington state border
Rathdrum	9.460	15.224	SH-41 north – Oldtown	West end of SH-41 overlap
Rathdrum	9.660	15.546	SH-41 south – Post Falls	East end of SH-41 overlap
	14.240	22.917	US 95 – Coeur d'Alene, Sandpoint	Interchange
1.000 mi = 1.609 km; 1.000 km = 0.621 mi: Concurrency terminus
