= Lakeland High School (Idaho) =

Location
- 7006 West Highway 53; Rathdrum, Idaho; United States
- 47°48′58″N 116°52′44″W

Information
- Type: Public high school
- Established: 1961, 1979
- School district: Lakeland Joint School District (#272)
- NCES School ID: 160180000311
- Principal: Jimmy Hoffman
- Teaching staff: 43.24 (FTE)
- Grades: 9–12
- Enrollment: 846 (2023–2024)
- Student to teacher ratio: 19.57
- Colors: Kelly Green & Greenbay Gold
- Athletics: IHSAA Class 5A
- Athletics conference: Inland Empire League
- Mascot: Hawk
- Rivals: Moscow, Lewiston, Sandpoint
- Yearbook: The Hawk
- Feeder schools: Lakeland Junior High
- Website: lhs.sd272.org

Lakeland High School is a four-year public secondary school in Rathdrum, Idaho, one of two traditional high schools in the Lakeland Joint School District #272 of northern Kootenai County. The current campus opened in 1979 as a senior high school(grades 10–12); The two high schools of Rathdrum and Spirit Lake camp together to form Lakeland High School in the fall of 1961. The campus located at the now Lakeland Middle School was built in 1962 and was moved into as soon as it was completed. In 1979, that building became the junior high school. The school colors are green and gold and the mascot is a hawk. Even though Rathdrum is a small city, many people attend Lakeland High School.

As of January 2008, the school enrolled about 800 students in grades 9–12. It serves students from the Rathdrum, Hauser Lake, Twin Lakes, Spirit Lake and Garwood communities, and other nearby areas. The Lakeland Joint School District was formed in 1948 by consolidating 13 smaller districts; the existing high schools in Rathdrum and Spirit Lake to the north operated until the first Lakeland High School opened in 1961. It took 13 years and 14 elections until the funding for LHS was approved by voters in June 1961. The initial Lakeland High School site on Main Street was deemed inadequate and the present site, now the junior high, was finished in 1962. The district's second high school, Timberlake, opened its doors in 1998 in Spirit Lake.

The two high schools from Spirit Lake and Rathdrum came together in the fall of 1961 to create Lakeland High School. The original site of Lakeland High School was in the Rathdrum High School, now Mountain View High School, on Main Street in Rathdrum.

== Athletics ==
Lakeland competes in athletics in IHSAA Class 5A, in the Inland Empire League (5A) with Sandpoint to the north and Moscow, about 100 miles (160 km) south.

=== State titles ===
==== Boys ====
- Football (2): fall (A-2, now 4A) 1988, 1989 (official with introduction of playoffs, A-2 in fall 1978)
  - (unofficial poll titles - 0) (poll introduced in 1963, through 1977)
- Basketball (1): (B) 1942 (as Spirit Lake H.S.)
- Wrestling (2): (A-2) 1988, 1989

==== Girls ====
- Basketball (3): (A-2) 1989, 2001; (3A) 2002 (introduced in 1976)
- Softball (2): (A-2) 2001; (3A) 2002 (introduced in 1997)
- Track (1): (3A) 2002 (introduced in 1971)
- Volleyball (4A) 2020
- Baseball (2) 1996, 1997

== Notable alumni ==
- Josh Phelps, former professional baseball player, class of 1996.
- Matthew Inman, author and illustrator, creator of The Oatmeal, class of 2000.
