= Hauser, Idaho =

- City
- Location of Hauser in Kootenai County, Idaho

- Location in the United States
- Coordinates: 47°45′20″N 117°00′25″W
- Country: United States
- State: Idaho
- County: Kootenai
- Established: May 12, 1981.

Area
  - Total: 0.99 sq mi (2.56 km^{2})
  - Land: 0.99 sq mi (2.56 km^{2})
  - Water: 0 sq mi (0.00 km^{2})
- Elevation: 2,205 ft (672 m)

Population (2020)
  - Total: 761
  - Density: 747.3/sq mi (288.53/km^{2})
- Time zone: UTC-8 (Pacific (PST))
  - Summer (DST): UTC-7 (PDT)
- ZIP code: 83854
- Area code: 208
- FIPS code: 16-35830
- GNIS feature ID: 2410714
- Website: www.cityofhauser.us

Hauser is a city in Kootenai County, Idaho, United States. As of the 2020 census, Hauser had a population of 761. The city is located on the southern end of Hauser Lake.

== Geography ==
The Washington-Idaho state line lies just to the west of Hauser. Idaho State Highway 53 runs along the southern edge of the city, providing transportation east to Rathdrum and west into Spokane metropolitan area. Hauser is part of the larger Spokane–Coeur d'Alene combined statistical area.

According to the United States Census Bureau, the city has a total area of 0.94 square miles (2.43 km^{2}), all land.

=== Hauser Lake ===
Hauser Lake is a freshwater lake just above Hauser. It covers 625 acres of land has an average depth of 21 feet. It originally went by a couple different names like, Sucker lake and Mud Lake until the lake was renamed Hauser Lake in honor of Samuel Thomas Hauser who was a governor of Montana Territory and good friend of Daniel Chase Corbin, the baron of the Spokane Falls and Northern Railway.

== Demographics ==
Historical population
Census	Pop.	Note	%±
1950	70		—
1960	127		81.4%
1970	349		174.8%
1980	305		−12.6%
1990	380		24.6%
2000	668		75.8%
2010	678		1.5%
2020	761		12.2%
U.S. Decennial Census

=== 2010 census ===
As of the census of 2010, there were 678 people, 302 households, and 190 families living in the city. The population density was 721.3 inhabitants per square mile (278.5/km^{2}). There were 326 housing units at an average density of 346.8 units per square mile (133.9 units/km^{2}). The racial makeup of the city was 94.5% White, 0.3% African American, 1.0% Native American, 0.4% Asian, 0.1% Pacific Islander, 0.3% from other races, and 3.2% from two or more races. Hispanic or Latino of any race were 2.1% of the population.

There were 302 households, of which 26.5% had children under the age of 18 living with them, 48.7% were married couples living together, 9.9% had a female householder with no husband present, 4.3% had a male householder with no wife present, and 37.1% were non-families. 28.1% of all households were made up of individuals, and 6.6% had someone living alone who was 65 years of age or older. The average household size was 2.25 and the average family size was 2.72.

The median age in the city was 44.2 years. 19.8% of residents were under the age of 18; 6.5% were between the ages of 18 and 24; 25.4% were from 25 to 44; 35.8% were from 45 to 64; and 12.5% were 65 years of age or older. The gender makeup of the city was 49.1% male and 50.9% female.

=== 2000 census ===
As of the census of 2000, there were 668 people, 273 households, and 197 families living in the city. The population density was 753.4 inhabitants per square mile (290.9/km^{2}). There were 296 housing units at an average density of 333.8 units per square mile (128.9 units/km^{2}). The racial makeup of the city was 95.36% White, 1.20% Native American, 0.30% Asian, and 3.14% from two or more races. Hispanic or Latino of any race were 2.25% of the population.

There were 273 households, out of which 32.6% had children under the age of 18 living with them, 57.9% were married couples living together, 9.5% had a female householder with no husband present, and 27.8% were non-families. 20.5% of all households were made up of individuals, and 5.1% had someone living alone who was 65 years of age or older. The average household size was 2.45 and the average family size was 2.83.

In the city, the population was spread out, with 24.3% under the age of 18, 8.1% from 18 to 24, 31.6% from 25 to 44, 27.2% from 45 to 64, and 8.8% who were 65 years of age or older. The median age was 36 years. For every 100 females, there were 95.3 males. For every 100 females age 18 and over, there were 94.6 males.

The median income for a household in the city was $30,268, and the median income for a family was $32,344. Males had a median income of $30,000 versus $21,125 for females. The per capita income for the city was $15,085. About 10.3% of families and 10.6% of the population were below the poverty line, including 13.0% of those under age 18 and 12.5% of those age 65 or over.

== See also ==
- Hauser Refueling Facility
