= Blanchard, Idaho =

Census-designated place in Bonner County, Idaho, United States

- Census-designated place
- Location of Blanchard in Bonner County, Idaho.

- Location within Idaho
- Coordinates: 48°00′46″N 117°00′00″W
- Country: United States
- State: Idaho
- County: Bonner

Area
  - Total: 1.530 sq mi (3.96 km^{2})
  - Land: 1.484 sq mi (3.84 km^{2})
  - Water: 0.046 sq mi (0.12 km^{2})
- Elevation: 2,267 ft (691 m)

Population (2020)
  - Total: 379
  - Density: 255/sq mi (98.6/km^{2})
- Time zone: UTC-8 (Pacific (PST))
  - Summer (DST): UTC-7 (PDT)
- ZIP code: 83804
- Area codes: 208, 986
- GNIS feature ID: 2585568

Blanchard is a census-designated place in Bonner County, Idaho, United States. Blanchard is located on Idaho State Highway 41 6.5 miles (10.5 km) northwest of Spirit Lake. Blanchard has a post office with ZIP code 83804. As of the 2020 census, Blanchard had a population of 379.

== History ==
A post office called White was established in 1903, but in 1908, the name was changed to Blanchard. The present name honors John Blanchard, a pioneer settler.

== Demographics ==
Historical population
Census	Pop.	Note	%±
2010	261		—
2020	379		45.2%
U.S. Decennial Census

Blanchard's population was estimated at 100 in 1960.

== Notable person ==
- Heather Scott, member of the Idaho House of Representatives.

== See also ==
- List of census-designated places in Idaho
