= Washington State Route 290 =

State highway in Spokane County, Washington, US

State Route 290
- Hamilton Street, Trent Avenue

Route information
- Maintained by WSDOT
- Length: 18.33 mi (29.50 km)
- Existed: 1964–present

Major junctions
- West end: I-90 in Spokane
- SR 27 in Spokane Valley
- East end: SH-53 at Idaho state border

Location
- Country: United States
- State: Washington
- Counties: Spokane

Highway system
- State highways in Washington; Interstate; US; State; Scenic; Pre-1964; 1964 renumbering; Former
← SR 285	→ SR 291

State Route 290 (SR 290), named Hamilton Street and Trent Avenue, is an 18-mile (29 km) long state highway serving Spokane County in the U.S. state of Washington. SR 290 travels parallel to a Union Pacific railroad from Interstate 90 (I-90) in Spokane through Millwood and across the Spokane River thrice towards Spokane Valley, where the highway intersects SR 27. From Spokane Valley, the roadway continues to the Idaho state border, where it becomes Idaho State Highway 53.

The current route of SR 290 was formerly county roads between 1901 and 1937 when it became Secondary State Highway 2H (SSH 2H). The highway ran from U.S. Route 2 (US 2) and US 395 in Downtown Spokane to Idaho until a 1964 renumbering of state highways, which re-designated SSH 2H as SR 290. A short spur route connecting the main highway to I-90 was also added during the renumbering, but SR 290 was realigned to replace the route in 2005.

== Route description ==
SR 290 begins as a short freeway at a directional T-interchange with Interstate 90 (I-90) east of downtown Spokane. This interchange was originally built for a planned North Spokane Corridor in the 1970s. The freeway continues north to an interchange with 2nd Avenue that only allows eastbound traffic to enter and westbound traffic to exit the freeway. The highway is named Hamilton Street and travels north over Sprague Avenue, BNSF Railway tracks, and the Spokane River before intersecting Trent Avenue, the former route of the roadway prior to 2005. At the intersection, located near Gonzaga University, SR 290 turns east and becomes Trent Avenue before crossing the Spokane River again. Trent Avenue travels northeast through an industrial district, paralleling the Spokane International branch of the Union Pacific Railroad, through Millwood before intersecting SR 27, locally named Pines Road. The highway crosses the Spokane River a third time and enters the Trentwood neighborhood of Spokane Valley, where it intersects Sullivan Road by way of a diamond interchange. From Spokane Valley, the roadway travels northeast through farmland to Newman Lake, where it crosses into Idaho and becomes Idaho State Highway 53, which continues east to Rathdrum as Trent Road.

SR 290 is maintained by the Washington State Department of Transportation (WSDOT), which conducts an annual survey on state highways to measure traffic volume in terms of annual average daily traffic. Average traffic volumes on the highway in 2016 ranged from a minimum of 7,000 vehicles at Havana Street in eastern Spokane to a maximum of 35,000 vehicles at the intersection of Hamilton Street and Trent Avenue. One of the main uses for SR 290 is to connect Interstate 90 to Spokane's University District, which includes the campuses of Gonzaga University, Washington State University, and Eastern Washington University.

== History ==
SR 290 was SSH 2H prior to 1964.

A road following the Great Northern Railway and Northern Pacific Railway line from Spokane to the Idaho state border at Newman Lake has existed since 1901. In 1937, the road became Secondary State Highway 2H (SSH 2H) and ran from Primary State Highway 2 in Spokane to Wellesley Avenue at the Idaho state border. SSH 2H was scheduled to be designated SR 290 in 1970 after a highway renumbering in 1964. The new designation was made to align with the sign route, now state route, system. In 1967, the eastern terminus of SSH 2H was shifted north to align with Idaho State Highway 53 (ID 53). In 1970, the state route system came into effect and SR 290 was formally established.

The state legislature established a spur route of SR 290 in 1977 to connect it with I-90, using a recently built interchange at Liberty Park that was intended for the cancelled north–south freeway project. The spur would require a new crossing of the Spokane River, named the James E. Keefe Bridge, and funding for its construction was delayed several times due to other needs in the state. The bridge's construction was plagued with issues, including a survey error that resulted in several misplaced piers, and an audit was conducted by the state after it was completed in November 1984. In 2005, the western terminus of SR 290 was moved southeast to an exit with I-90, replacing the spur route.

Until its closure in 2020, the highway crossed the Spokane River on the East Trent Bridge, which was constructed in 1910 by the Spokane city government. The concrete arch bridge was demolished and replaced over a three-year period at a cost of $25 million. The new bridge at the location, which incorporated similar design features but also includes bicycle lanes and wider walkways, opened to traffic in July 2023.

== Major intersections ==
The entire highway is in Spokane County.

Location	mi	km	Destinations	Notes
Spokane	0.00	0.00	I-90 – Seattle, Coeur d'Alene	Western terminus; directional T-interchange
Spokane	0.15	0.24	2nd Avenue	Eastbound entrance and westbound exit
Spokane			East end of freeway	
Spokane	0.67	1.08	Trent Avenue / Spokane Falls Boulevard / Hamilton Street – Downtown Spokane	Former SR 290; Former SR 290 Spur
Spokane Valley	8.36	13.45	SR 27 (Pines Road) – Pullman	
Spokane Valley	10.46	16.83	Sullivan Road	Diamond interchange
Spokane Valley	12.59	20.26	Wellesley Avenue / Barker Road – Otis Orchards	Former SSH 2H
	18.33	29.50	SH-53 (West Trent Road) – Rathdrum	Eastern terminus; Idaho state border
1.000 mi = 1.609 km; 1.000 km = 0.621 mi

== Spur route ==
State Route 290 Spur
- Location: Spokane, Washington
- Length: 0.67 mi (1,080 m)
- Existed: 1977–2005

Washington State Route 290 Spur was a 0.67-mile (1.08 km) long spur route of SR 290 prior to 2005. The spur route served as a short connector to Interstate 90 (I-90) east of downtown Spokane and ran from SR 290 at the intersection of Trent Avenue and Hamilton Street near Gonzaga University to a directional T-interchange with I-90, via a bridge over the Spokane River. The highway was originally established in 1977 to connect I-90 with SR 290, which went east from U.S. Route 2 (US 2) and U.S. Route 395 (US 395) in downtown Spokane to Idaho. This spur route followed a portion of the cancelled North/South Freeway, which was intended to bypass Downtown Spokane and the Division Street corridor. The western terminus of SR 290 was realigned in 2005, ending at I-90 along the former route of SR 290 Spur.

Major intersections

The entire highway was in Spokane, Spokane County.

mi	km	Destinations	Notes
0.00	0.00	SR 290 – Spokane, Spokane Valley, Rathdrum	Northern terminus; at-grade intersection
0.55	0.89	2nd Avenue	Northbound entrance and southbound exit
0.67	1.08	I-90 – Seattle, Coeur d'Alene	Southern terminus; directional T-interchange
1.000 mi = 1.609 km; 1.000 km = 0.621 mi
