= Kootenai County Courthouse =

- U.S. National Register of Historic Places
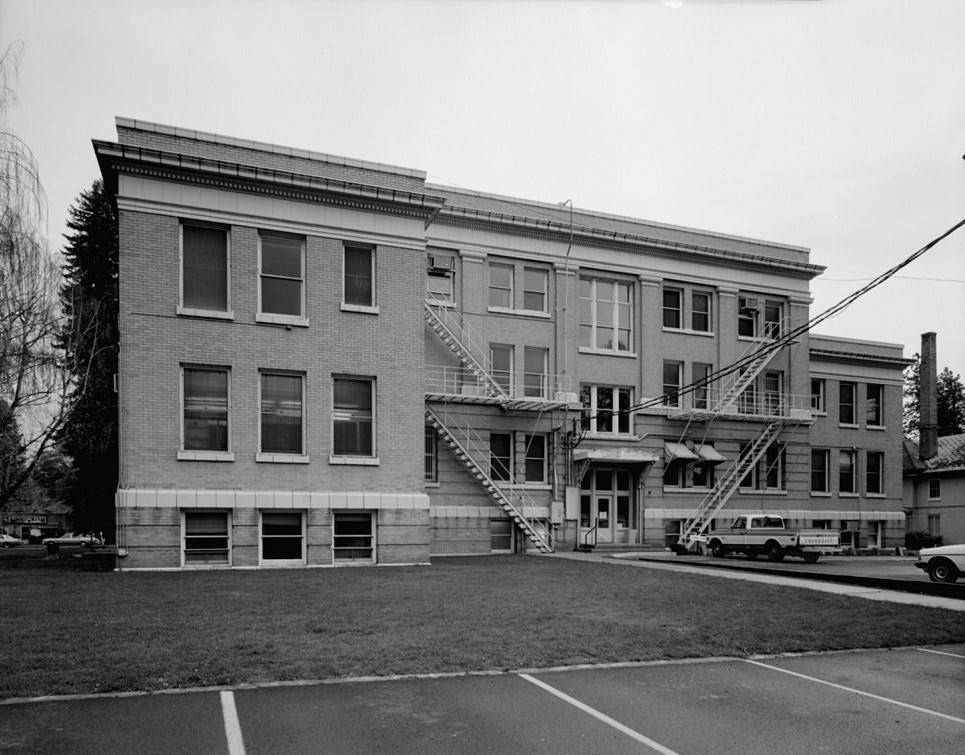

- Location within Idaho Location within the United States
- Interactive map showing the location of Kootenai County Courthouse
- Location: 501 Government Way, Coeur d'Alene, Idaho
- Coordinates: 47°40′38″N 116°47′12″W
- Area: less than one acre
- Built: 1925-26
- Architect: Zittle, Julius A.
- Architectural style: Georgian Revival
- NRHP reference No.: 77000462
- Added to NRHP: December 23, 1977

The Kootenai County Courthouse, located at 501 Government Way in Coeur d'Alene, is the county courthouse serving Kootenai County, Idaho. The courthouse was built in 1925–26. Spokane architect Julius A. Zittle designed the Georgian Revival building. A portico at the entrance features an entablature, frieze, and balcony supported by two Doric columns. The second-floor front windows are arched and have terra cotta ornamentation; brick pilasters separate the windows. The building is topped by a cornice and a brick parapet; a decorative Idaho state seal is located on the parapet above the entrance.

The courthouse was added to the National Register of Historic Places on December 23, 1977.
