= Idaho State Highway 19 =

State highway in Idaho, United States

State Highway 19
- SH-19 highlighted in red

Route information
- Maintained by ITD
- Length: 20.855 mi (33.563 km)

Major junctions
- West end: OR 201 near Homedale
- US 95 in Wilder
- East end: I-84 / US 30 in Caldwell

Location
- Country: United States
- State: Idaho
- Counties: Canyon, Owyhee

Highway system
- Idaho State Highway System; Interstate; US; State
← SH-16	→ US 20

State Highway 19 (SH-19) is a state highway in Idaho from the Oregon state line to Interstate 84 (I-84) and U.S. Route 30 (US 30) in Caldwell. SH-19 is signed as an east–west highway.

== Route description ==
Its western terminus is at the Oregon state line; the highway continues west then north as Oregon 201. After passing through Homedale, it is concurrent with US 95 to Wilder. SH-19 then turns east, passing through Greenleaf before ending at I-84 in Caldwell.

== History ==
SH-19 was extended through downtown Caldwell to an interchange with I-84 in 2022 as part of a long-term relinquishment of I-84 Business to the city government.

== Major intersections ==
County	Location	mi	km	Destinations	Notes
Owyhee		0.000	0.000	OR 201	
Owyhee	Homedale	4.827 34.195	7.768 55.032	Main Street / Idaho Avenue	Old alignment of US 95
Owyhee	Homedale	34.572	55.638	US 95 Conn.	
Owyhee	Homedale	34.638	55.744	US 95 south – Marsing, Jordan Valley	West end of US 95 overlap
Canyon	Wilder	38.429 9.070	61.845 14.597	US 95 north – Wilder, Payette	East end of US 95 overlap
Canyon	Caldwell	19.830	31.913	SH-19 Conn. to I-84 BL – Nampa	
Canyon	Caldwell	19.915	32.050	I-84 BL east – Nampa	West end of I-84 Bus. overlap
Canyon	Caldwell	20.855	33.563	I-84 / US 30 – Ontario, Nampa, Boise	East end of I-84 Bus. overlap
1.000 mi = 1.609 km; 1.000 km = 0.621 mi

== Connector route ==
State Highway 19 Connector
- Location: Caldwell
- Length: 0.045 mi (72 m)

State Highway 19 Connector is a short one-way route connecting SH-19 and I-84 Bus.

== See also ==
- List of state highways in Idaho
- List of highways numbered 19
