= Clarksville, Idaho =

Unincorporated community in the state of Idaho, United States

- Unincorporated community
- Location within Idaho Location within the United States
- Coordinates: 47°45′14″N 116°43′59″W
- Country: United States
- State: Idaho
- County: Kootenai
- Elevation: 2,333 ft (711 m)
- Time zone: UTC-8 (Pacific (PST))
  - Summer (DST): UTC-7 (PDT)
- Area codes: 208, 986
- GNIS feature ID: 396295

Clarksville is an unincorporated community in Kootenai County, Idaho, United States. Clarksville is located on the south shore of Lake Hayden, 6 miles (9.7 km) north-northeast of Coeur d'Alene.

== History ==
Clarksville's population was 44 persons in 1960.
