= Squeatah Creek =

Stream in the state of Idaho

Coordinates: 47°24′27″N 116°46′18″W

Squeatah Creek is a stream in the Coeur d'Alene Reservation in Kootenai County, Idaho, in the United States. It is a tributary of the Saint Joe River.

Formerly Squaw Creek, the stream was renamed in 2007 to remove the ethnic slur at the request of the Coeur d'Alene tribe. Squeatah was the name of a Spokane Indian woman relocated to the Coeur d'Alene Reservation.

== See also ==
- List of rivers of Idaho
