= Fernan Lake Village, Idaho =

- City
- Location of Fernan Lake Village in Kootenai County, Idaho.

- Location in the United States
- Coordinates: 47°40′18″N 116°44′55″W
- Country: United States
- State: Idaho
- County: Kootenai
- Incorporated: July 15, 1957

Area
  - Total: 0.077 sq mi (0.20 km^{2})
  - Land: 0.077 sq mi (0.20 km^{2})
  - Water: 0 sq mi (0.00 km^{2})
- Elevation: 2,149 ft (655 m)

Population (2020)
  - Total: 164
  - Density: 2,241.0/sq mi (865.27/km^{2})
- Time zone: UTC-8 (Pacific (PST))
  - Summer (DST): UTC-7 (PDT)
- Area code: 208
- FIPS code: 16-27550
- GNIS feature ID: 2410496
- Website: www.fernanvillage.org

Fernan Lake Village is a city in Kootenai County, Idaho, United States. As of the 2020 census, Fernan Lake Village had a population of 164. It borders Fernan Lake to the east, in which the town gets its name.

== Geography ==
According to the United States Census Bureau, the city has a total area of 0.07 square miles (0.18 km^{2}), all land.

== History ==
Fernan Lake Village was occupied by several settlers in the early 20th century. The owner of many estates in Fernan Lake Village, Sam Theis, tried to get his lots annexed into the city of Coeur d'Alene but it never went through. On May 20, 1957, 32 residents petitioned for the incorporation of the “Village of Fernan Lake" and was signed by the Idaho Supreme Court on July 15, 1957. The lake gets its name from John Fernan, a soldier stationed at Fort Sherman who homesteaded the area.

== Demographics ==
Historical population
Census	Pop.	Note	%±
1960	134		—
1970	179		33.6%
1980	178		−0.6%
1990	170		−4.5%
2000	186		9.4%
2010	169		−9.1%
2020	164		−3.0%
2019 (est.)	171		1.2%
U.S. Decennial Census

=== 2010 census ===
As of the census of 2010, there were 169 people, 72 households, and 51 families residing in the city. The population density was 2,414.3 inhabitants per square mile (932.2/km^{2}). There were 77 housing units at an average density of 1,100.0 units per square mile (424.7 units/km^{2}). The racial makeup of the city was 96.4% White, 0.6% African American, 1.2% Native American, and 1.8% Asian. Hispanic or Latino of any race were 4.7% of the population.

There were 72 households, of which 22.2% had children under the age of 18 living with them, 68.1% were married couples living together, 1.4% had a female householder with no husband present, 1.4% had a male householder with no wife present, and 29.2% were non-families. 19.4% of all households were made up of individuals, and 11.1% had someone living alone who was 65 years of age or older. The average household size was 2.35 and the average family size was 2.73.

The median age in the city was 54.3 years. 16.6% of residents were under the age of 18; 5.3% were between the ages of 18 and 24; 17.8% were from 25 to 44; 36.1% were from 45 to 64; and 24.3% were 65 years of age or older. The gender makeup of the city was 53.8% male and 46.2% female.

=== 2000 census ===
As of the census of 2000, there were 186 people, 70 households, and 52 families residing in the city. The population density was 2,069.0 inhabitants per square mile (798.8/km^{2}). There were 71 housing units at an average density of 789.8 units per square mile (304.9 units/km^{2}). The racial makeup of the city was 95.16% White, 0.54% Native American, 2.15% Asian, 0.54% from other races, and 1.61% from two or more races. Hispanic or Latino of any race were 1.61% of the population.

There were 70 households, out of which 44.3% had children under the age of 18 living with them, 65.7% were married couples living together, 2.9% had a female householder with no husband present, and 25.7% were non-families. 22.9% of all households were made up of individuals, and 14.3% had someone living alone who was 65 years of age or older. The average household size was 2.66 and the average family size was 3.15.

In the city, the population was spread out, with 30.1% under the age of 18, 3.2% from 18 to 24, 17.2% from 25 to 44, 28.5% from 45 to 64, and 21.0% who were 65 years of age or older. The median age was 45 years. For every 100 females, there were 104.4 males. For every 100 females age 18 and over, there were 91.2 males.

The median income for a household in the city was $68,125, and the median income for a family was $73,125. Males had a median income of $80,393 versus $43,125 for females. The per capita income for the city was $35,384. About 9.3% of families and 14.6% of the population were below the poverty line, including 28.3% of those under the age of eighteen and none of those 65 or over.
