= Spirit Lake (Idaho) =

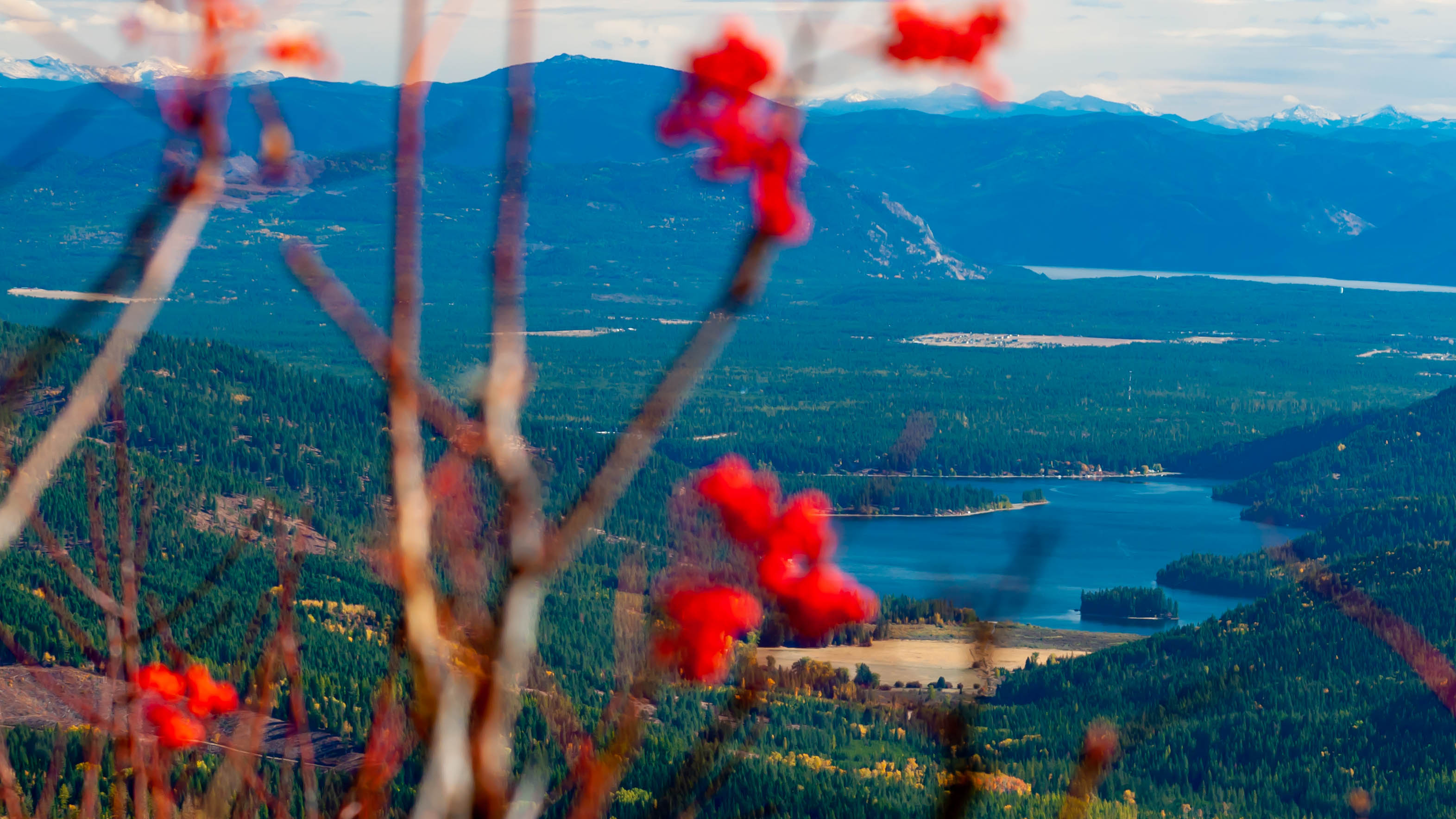

- Location within Idaho
- Location: Kootenai County, Idaho
- Coordinates: 47°56′N 116°54′W
- Type: lake
- Surface elevation: 2,440 ft (740 m)

Spirit Lake is a lake in the western United States, located in Kootenai County in northern Idaho.

According to tradition, Spirit Lake received its name from the spirit of a heartbroken Native American woman whose drowning in the lake was intentional. Its surface elevation is 2,440 feet (740 m) above sea level. The lake is about 16 miles (26 km) north-northwest of the city of Coeur d'Alene.

The city of Spirit Lake is on a narrow arm of the lake, on its northeast shore.

== See also ==
- List of lakes of Idaho
- List of dams and reservoirs in Idaho
