= Bayview, Idaho =

Unincorporated community in the state of Idaho, United States

- Unincorporated community
- Location within Idaho Location within the United States
- Coordinates: 47°58′49″N 116°33′37″W
- Country: United States
- State: Idaho
- County: Kootenai
- Elevation: 2,096 ft (639 m)
- Time zone: UTC-8 (Pacific (PST))
  - Summer (DST): UTC-7 (PDT)
- ZIP code: 83803
- Area codes: 208, 986
- GNIS feature ID: 396083

Bayview is an unincorporated community in the northwest United States, located in Kootenai County, Idaho, north of Coeur d'Alene. On the southwest shore of Lake Pend Oreille, Bayview is seven miles (11 km) east-northeast of Athol. The community is served by State Highway 54 and a post office with ZIP code 83803; its approximate elevation is 2,100 feet (640 m) above sea level. Nearby is Farragut State Park, formerly the Farragut Naval Training Station, a major training facility during World War II.

The U.S. Navy's Acoustic Research Detachment operates from Bayview, testing new submarine and surface ship shapes and subsystems. It is a remote facility of the Naval Surface Warfare Center

== History ==
Bayview's population was 75 in 1909, and was 250 in 1960.

== Climate ==
Climate data for Bayview, Idaho (Bayview Model Basin), 1991–2020 normals, extremes 1947–present
Month	Jan	Feb	Mar	Apr	May	Jun	Jul	Aug	Sep	Oct	Nov	Dec	Year
Record high °F (°C)	55 (13)	62 (17)	73 (23)	81 (27)	94 (34)	98 (37)	101 (38)	101 (38)	97 (36)	82 (28)	69 (21)	59 (15)	101 (38)
Mean maximum °F (°C)	48.5 (9.2)	50.1 (10.1)	59.1 (15.1)	70.6 (21.4)	81.3 (27.4)	86.6 (30.3)	93.2 (34.0)	94.4 (34.7)	84.8 (29.3)	71.3 (21.8)	56.1 (13.4)	48.0 (8.9)	95.4 (35.2)
Mean daily maximum °F (°C)	34.7 (1.5)	38.0 (3.3)	45.3 (7.4)	54.1 (12.3)	64.0 (17.8)	70.5 (21.4)	80.2 (26.8)	79.5 (26.4)	68.9 (20.5)	54.1 (12.3)	41.6 (5.3)	34.4 (1.3)	55.4 (13.0)
Daily mean °F (°C)	28.7 (−1.8)	30.7 (−0.7)	36.5 (2.5)	43.4 (6.3)	51.6 (10.9)	57.9 (14.4)	64.9 (18.3)	64.2 (17.9)	55.5 (13.1)	43.6 (6.4)	34.5 (1.4)	28.4 (−2.0)	45.0 (7.2)
Mean daily minimum °F (°C)	22.6 (−5.2)	23.3 (−4.8)	27.7 (−2.4)	32.8 (0.4)	39.1 (3.9)	45.2 (7.3)	49.7 (9.8)	49.0 (9.4)	42.2 (5.7)	33.2 (0.7)	27.4 (−2.6)	22.3 (−5.4)	34.5 (1.4)
Mean minimum °F (°C)	5.6 (−14.7)	8.1 (−13.3)	14.2 (−9.9)	23.4 (−4.8)	26.8 (−2.9)	34.6 (1.4)	39.4 (4.1)	36.9 (2.7)	28.6 (−1.9)	19.7 (−6.8)	12.0 (−11.1)	6.9 (−13.9)	−1.9 (−18.8)
Record low °F (°C)	−29 (−34)	−30 (−34)	−12 (−24)	15 (−9)	19 (−7)	28 (−2)	32 (0)	27 (−3)	17 (−8)	0 (−18)	−14 (−26)	−28 (−33)	−30 (−34)
Average precipitation inches (mm)	2.38 (60)	1.83 (46)	2.50 (64)	2.06 (52)	2.33 (59)	1.93 (49)	0.91 (23)	0.92 (23)	0.99 (25)	2.16 (55)	3.06 (78)	3.58 (91)	24.65 (625)
Average snowfall inches (cm)	8.7 (22)	3.2 (8.1)	1.8 (4.6)	0.0 (0.0)	0.0 (0.0)	0.0 (0.0)	0.0 (0.0)	0.0 (0.0)	0.0 (0.0)	0.0 (0.0)	1.4 (3.6)	12.1 (31)	27.2 (69.3)
Average precipitation days (≥ 0.01 in)	12.9	9.6	12.2	11.1	10.0	9.2	4.2	3.6	5.4	10.4	13.3	13.6	115.5
Average snowy days (≥ 0.1 in)	4.3	2.7	1.4	0.1	0.0	0.0	0.0	0.0	0.0	0.2	1.6	5.4	15.7
Source 1: NOAA
Source 2: National Weather Service

== Parks and recreation ==
=== Farragut State Park ===
Approximately four miles (6.5 km) west of Bayview, Farragut State Park is sited on the grounds of the former Farragut Naval Training Station at the foot of the Coeur d'Alene Mountains in the Bitterroot Range. At 4,000 acres (6.3 mi^{2}; 16 km^{2}), it is one of Idaho's largest state parks and borders Lake Pend Oreille. The park features a small beach, a trail network connected to Bayview, and disc golf courses. An excellent wildlife viewing area, Farragut is home to mountain goats, whitetail deer, badgers, black bears, coyotes, bobcats, and an occasional elk.

== Events and activities ==
Bayview Daze is the annual summer celebration for the town, usually held in early July.

Bayview is the home location for the Lake Pend Oreille Yacht Club. Lake Pend Oreille Yacht Club is a non-profit organization which promotes racing, cruising and educational activities on Lake Pend Oreille for sailors and people interested in sailing.

Lake Pend Oreille offers over two hundred miles (320 km) of alpine fresh water shoreline and stretches over 42 miles (68 km) from Bayview to Sandpoint. Water sports include fishing, boating, water skiing, and swimming. Other attractions are camping, hiking and exploring, biking, with great hunting in the fall.

The club began in 1977 by Keith Sheckler and others to promote sailing in Sandpoint, Idaho. The club's active racing program attracted sailors from all around the Inland Northwest. As its membership grew, its demographics shifted south, as more and more of its members were from Coeur d’Alene and Spokane. Racing at the south end of the lake grew and eventually the Club migrated south too, from Sandpoint to Bayview. To fill the void in the north, Keith Sheckler spearheaded the creation of the Sandpoint Sailing Association (SSA) which cooperates with LPOYC to provide many racing and cruising opportunities on Lake Pend Oreille.
