= Oldtown, Idaho =

- City
- Location of Oldtown in Bonner County, Idaho.
- Coordinates: 48°10′57″N 117°00′18″W
- Country: United States
- State: Idaho
- County: Bonner

Area
  - Total: 0.84 sq mi (2.18 km^{2})
  - Land: 0.82 sq mi (2.12 km^{2})
  - Water: 0.023 sq mi (0.06 km^{2})
- Elevation: 2,070 ft (630 m)

Population (2020)
  - Total: 221
  - Density: 270/sq mi (104/km^{2})
- Time zone: UTC-8 (Pacific (PST))
  - Summer (DST): UTC-7 (PDT)
- ZIP code: 83822
- Area codes: 208, 986
- FIPS code: 16-58600
- GNIS feature ID: 2411314

Oldtown is a city in Bonner County, Idaho and suburb of Newport, Washington, with a population of 221 at the 2020 census. It is located on the Pend Oreille River, just east of Newport. There are no natural or physical barriers, and it is strictly a political division, separated by the straight-line state boundary. Oldtown is squeezed between this boundary to the west and the river to the east, leaving the main business district on U.S. Route 2 with only 700 feet (210 meters) of space in which to operate on the Idaho side. Many homes are located in the south end on the other side of the railroad, as the Pend Oreille is somewhat further away here.

== History ==
The community that became Oldtown developed as an extension of Newport, Washington, during the rapid growth of the Pend Oreille River valley in the late nineteenth century. Following the arrival of the Great Northern Railway in the region during the 1890s, commerce and settlement expanded on both sides of the Idaho–Washington border. Lumber mills, river transportation, and railroad activity became central to the local economy, with timber harvested from surrounding forests shipped throughout the Inland Northwest.

Before adopting its current name, the Idaho-side settlement was commonly referred to as “Newport, Idaho.” The community initially served as a port and supply point for settlers in the Pend Oreille Valley, with a general store, post office, hotel, and other businesses. The proximity of the two communities led to confusion over postal services and commercial activity. As settlement expanded on the Washington side, the post office was moved there, and the original Idaho settlement gradually declined. In April 1947, the former settlement was incorporated under the name Oldtown.

The timber industry remained an important influence on Oldtown and the surrounding region throughout the twentieth century. Logging, sawmilling, and the processing of cedar products provided employment and supported related businesses in both Oldtown and Newport. The Pend Oreille River and regional rail connections facilitated the transportation of timber and other goods. As the regional economy changed, industrial properties continued to occupy a significant place in the area's commercial landscape.

Because of its location directly along the Idaho–Washington border, Oldtown developed as part of a closely connected interstate community with Newport. The two cities share a continuous built-up area, and residents have historically crossed the state line for employment, shopping, education, and other services. U.S. Route 2 became an important commercial and transportation corridor through the area, linking local businesses with communities elsewhere in northern Idaho and eastern Washington.

In October 2003, the Stateline Tavern shooting in Oldtown received national media attention after four people were killed before the gunman died by suicide. The incident was one of the most serious criminal events in the history of the surrounding community.

During the early twenty-first century, Oldtown continued to function as a residential and commercial community connected economically to Newport and the wider region. Commercial development along U.S. Route 2 and new housing projects contributed to changes in the city's built environment. The former Tri-Pro Cedar Products mill property became the focus of a proposed phased redevelopment intended to introduce residential and commercial uses while transforming part of the area's historic industrial landscape. In September 2025, an Idaho Transportation Department board packet described discussions with Oldtown officials about the proposed mill-site redevelopment, including the possibility of future highway improvements as development progressed.

== Development ==
Plans for redevelopment of the former mill property in Oldtown, Idaho, emerged alongside efforts to accommodate future growth in the city. In July 2009, the Spokane Journal of Business reported that the Oldtown City Council had approved a request to annex approximately 400 acres, including riverfront property owned by Steve Linton and his family. Linton was associated with Tri-Pro Cedar Products, a local timber business.

Residential development in Oldtown has also included Cedar Park, a housing community developed by Monogram Homes. The development comprises 34 homesites arranged across three blocks and offers newly constructed single-family homes, with floor plans including three- and four-bedroom options.

The former mill property was subsequently proposed for redevelopment as Old Mill, a mixed-use development planned for the banks of the Pend Oreille River. The approximately 180-acre project is associated with property owners Steve and Jill Linton and architect Glen Lanker of ARTIOS, Inc. Plans include residential neighborhoods, commercial space, open areas, and the reuse of historic mill buildings. The development is intended to proceed in phases, with a range of housing types and commercial uses incorporated into the site plan.

In September 2025, an Idaho Transportation Department board packet described the proposed redevelopment of the Tri-Pro Cedar mill site as a phased project expected to extend over 10 to 20 years. The document anticipated that mill operations would continue for approximately five years and discussed potential improvements to U.S. Route 2, including turn lanes and a traffic signal if warranted by future traffic conditions.

By 2026, residential lots associated with the initial phase of the Old Mill development, designated Phase 1A, were being marketed. The broader development plan includes additional residential and commercial components intended to be built in subsequent phases.

== Geography ==
According to the United States Census Bureau, the city has a total area of 0.83 square miles (2.15 km^{2}), of which, 0.82 square miles (2.12 km^{2}) is land and 0.01 square miles (0.03 km^{2}) is water.

== Demographics ==
Historical population
Census	Pop.	Note	%±
1950	358		—
1960	211		−41.1%
1970	161		−23.7%
1980	257		59.6%
1990	151		−41.2%
2000	190		25.8%
2010	184		−3.2%
2020	221		20.1%
U.S. Decennial Census

=== 2010 census ===
At the 2010 census there were 184 people in 80 households, including 47 families, in the city. The population density was 224.4 inhabitants per square mile (86.6/km^{2}). There were 109 housing units at an average density of 132.9 per square mile (51.3/km^{2}). The racial makup of the city was 98.4% White, 0.5% African American, 0.5% from other races, and 0.5% from two or more races. Hispanic or Latino of any race were 2.7%.

Of the 80 households 35.0% had children under the age of 18 living with them, 32.5% were married couples living together, 18.8% had a female householder with no husband present, 7.5% had a male householder with no wife present, and 41.3% were non-families. 35.0% of households were one person and 10% were one person aged 65 or older. The average household size was 2.30 and the average family size was 2.87.

The median age was 41.1 years. 25% of residents were under the age of 18; 3.8% were between the ages of 18 and 24; 25.4% were from 25 to 44; 30.4% were from 45 to 64; and 15.2% were 65 or older. The gender makeup of the city was 49.5% male and 50.5% female.

=== 2000 census ===
At the 2000 census there were 190 people in 81 households, including 46 families, in the city. The population density was 819.4 inhabitants per square mile (316.4/km^{2}). There were 100 housing units at an average density of 431.2 per square mile (166.5/km^{2}). The racial makup of the city was 93.68% White, 3.16% Native American, and 3.16% from two or more races. Hispanic or Latino of any race were 2.11%.

Of the 81 households 27.2% had children under the age of 18 living with them, 42.0% were married couples living together, 12.3% had a female householder with no husband present, and 42.0% were non-families. 34.6% of households were one person and 12.3% were one person aged 65 or older. The average household size was 2.35 and the average family size was 3.00.

The age distribution was 26.8% under the age of 18, 8.9% from 18 to 24, 30.0% from 25 to 44, 18.9% from 45 to 64, and 15.3% 65 or older. The median age was 38 years. For every 100 females, there were 91.9 males. For every 100 females age 18 and over, there were 80.5 males.

The median household income was $23,542 and the median family income was $23,125. Males had a median income of $26,250 versus $10,625 for females. The per capita income for the city was $11,893. About 21.6% of families and 22.4% of the population were below the poverty line, including 23.5% of those under the age of eighteen and 6.3% of those sixty five or over.

== See also ==
- List of cities in Idaho
