= Kootenai County, Idaho =

County in Idaho, United States

- County
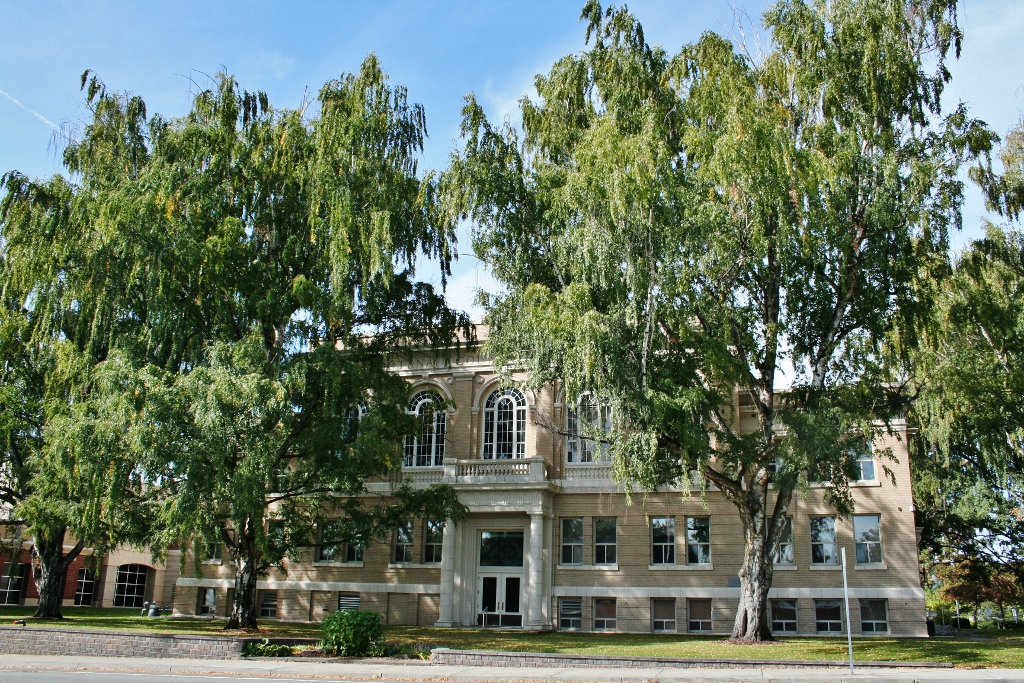
- Kootenai County Courthouse

- Seal

- Location within the U.S. state of Idaho
- Coordinates: 47°41′N 116°42′W
- Country: United States
- State: Idaho
- Founded: December 22, 1864
- Named for: Kootenai tribe
- Seat: Coeur d'Alene
- Largest city: Coeur d'Alene

Area
  - Total: 1,316 sq mi (3,410 km^{2})
  - Land: 1,244 sq mi (3,220 km^{2})
  - Water: 71 sq mi (180 km^{2}) 5.4%

Population (2020)
  - Total: 171,362
  - Estimate (2025): 191,864 ▲
  - Density: 137.8/sq mi (53.19/km^{2})
- Time zone: UTC−8 (Pacific)
  - Summer (DST): UTC−7 (PDT)
- Congressional district: 1st
- Website: www.kcgov.us

Kootenai County (/ˈkuːtniː/ KOOT-nee) is located in the U.S. state of Idaho. As of the 2020 census, its population was 171,362, making it the third-most populous county in Idaho and the largest in North Idaho, the county accounting for 45.4% of the region's total population. The county seat and largest city is Coeur d'Alene. The county was established in 1864 and named after the Kootenai tribe. Kootenai County is coterminous with the Coeur d'Alene metropolitan area, which along with the Spokane metropolitan area comprises the Spokane–Coeur d'Alene combined statistical area.

== History ==
=== Natives and early European activity ===
The Coeur d'Alene region takes its name from that given the local natives by French fur trappers. The tribe initially consisted of three bands that inhabited the areas surrounding Coeur d'Alene Lake and the Coeur d'Alene River. Canadian fur trade came to the region starting in 1809, marking the tribe's first contact with Europeans. Christian missionaries would follow with the first Christian meeting officiated by Father Nicolas Pointe on the north bank of Coeur d'Alene Lake at its junction with the Spokane River on December 2, 1842. The St. Joseph mission was initially established northwest of St. Maries in 1844 before being renamed Mission of the Sacred Heart at its relocation to the Cataldo site in 1846. Construction of Idaho's oldest structure commenced with construction of the mission church being completed by 1855. The mission headquarters was moved to DeSmet in 1877.

The Mullan Road was constructed through the area in 1859 with the route originally running on the southern side of Coeur d'Alene Lake. A route on the northern side of Coeur D'Alene Lake commenced in 1861. Mullan's men celebrated Independence Day of 1861 at Fourth of July Canyon east of Coeur d'Alene.

=== Kootenai County settled, fails to organize ===
The Idaho Territorial Legislature created Kootenai County on December 22, 1864. A county government was not immediately organized as a result of lack of significant settlement in the region. Kootenai County contained 81 residents at the 1864 Census of Idaho Territory. Rathdrum was the first of the present incorporated cities to experience settlement starting in 1861. It became a stagecoach stop and later the Kootenai County seat. At the 1870 census, the region was reported under Nez Perce County as the Kootenai District with 31 residents. Post Falls was settled in 1871 while Camp Coeur d'Alene was established in 1878. The camp became a Fort in 1879 and the town of Coeur d'Alene grew up around the fort. Dalton Gardens, Hayden, and Hayden Lake were also settled around this time.

=== Kootenai County organized ===
After almost 17 years of existence, Kootenai County finally organized on July 9, 1881. The county's importance grew as a result of completion of the Northern Pacific Railway in 1882 to Rathdrum as well as discovery of gold on the Coeur d'Alene River in neighboring Shoshone County in 1883. Existing settlements grew and new ones were established as a result. Settlement commenced on the railroad at Athol in 1882 and Harrison in 1890.

=== Development of cities ===
Continued population growth led to the development of cities. In 1899, Harrison was the county's first city to incorporate. Coeur d'Alene, Spirit Lake, and Athol followed in 1906, 1908, and 1909. Incorporation of Rathdrum Post Falls, and Worley occurred prior to 1920. Clarksville, Hayden Lake, Huetter, State Line, and Eddiville were all incorporated in 1947. Hayden, Dalton Gardens, and Fernan Lake incorporated after 1950. Eddiville and Clarksville were dis-incorporated prior to 1970.

=== County boundary history ===
At the time of the Coeur d'Alene Mission's establishment, the territory of Kootenai County was claimed by both the United States and Britain. The government of Oregon Country established four districts on July 5, 1843, and Kootenai's territory was within the boundary of the Clackamas District that later became Clackamas County under Oregon Territory. Washington Territory was established March 2, 1853. Kootenai's territory fell under Walla Walla County starting 1864, followed by Spokane County in 1858. Idaho Territory was established March 3, 1863, resulting in Kootenai County's territory not falling under any county's jurisdiction. On February 2, 1864, it was attached jurisdictionally to Nez Perce County, but remained outside of that county's boundary. The Counties of Kootenai and Lah-Toh were created on December 22, 1864, with Lah-Toh covering Kootenai's present territory. Both counties failed to organize and by 1867, Lah-Toh was abolished and its territory transferred to Kootenai County. Bonner was partitioned off in 1907 and Benewah partitioned in 1915 to give Kootenai its present boundary. In 1905, the legislature attempted to abolish Kootenai County and create the counties of Lewis and Clark in its place. The act was declared unconstitutional by the Idaho Supreme Court.

== Geography ==
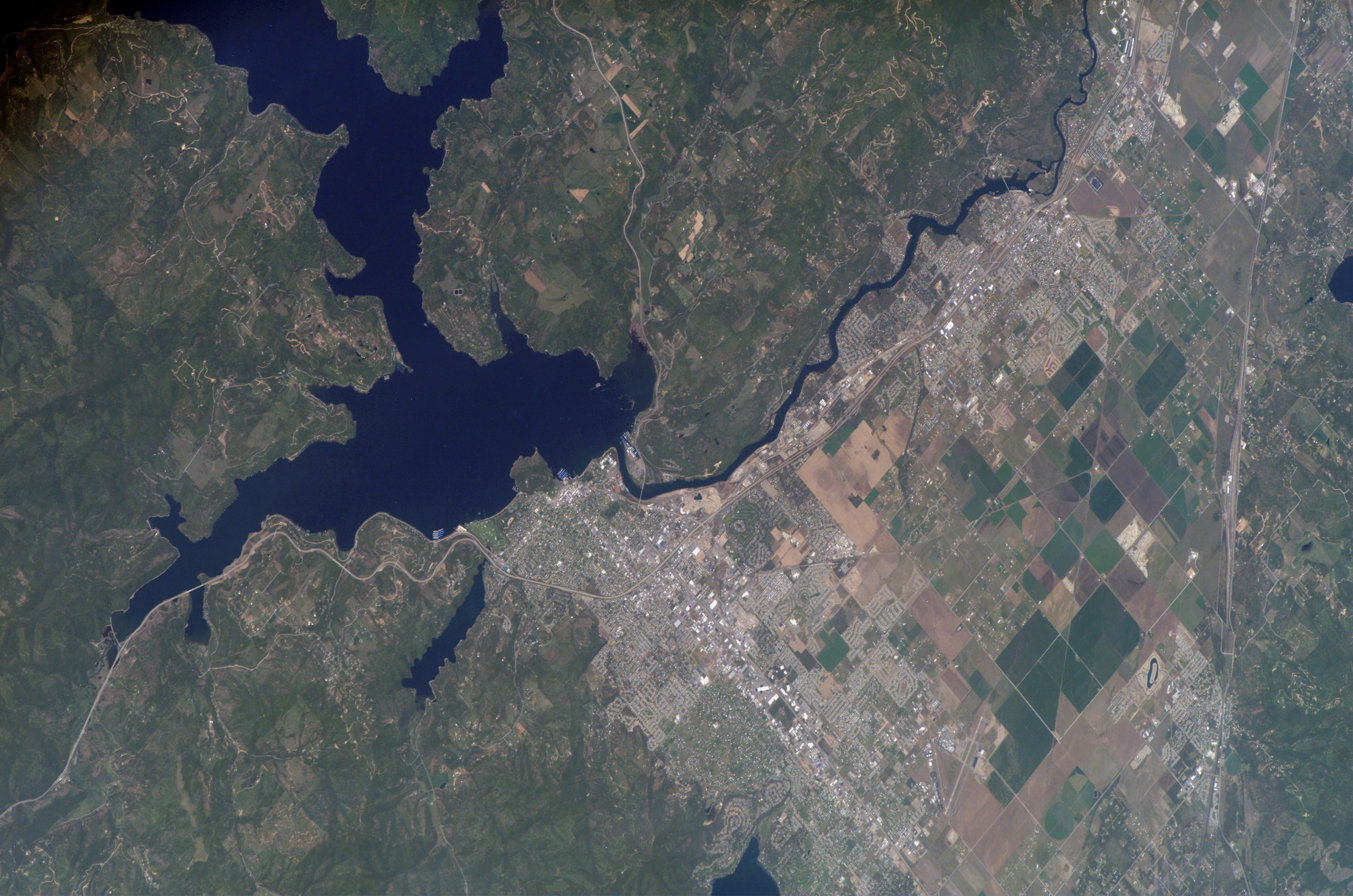
The Coeur d'Alene Metropolitan Area from space

According to the United States Census Bureau, the county has a total area of 1,316 square miles (3,410 km^{2}), of which 1,244 square miles (3,220 km^{2}) is land and 71 square miles (180 km^{2}) (5.4%) is water. The county water area includes Lake Coeur d'Alene and the southernmost portion of Lake Pend Oreille. Kootenai County is part of the Inland Empire in the Idaho Panhandle. Streems in Kootenai county include Squeatah Creek and Steamchet Creek.

=== Adjacent counties ===
- Bonner County – north
- Shoshone County – east
- Benewah County – south
- Spokane County, Washington – west

=== National protected areas ===
- Coeur d'Alene National Forest (part)
- Kaniksu National Forest (part)

=== Major highways ===
- I-90
- I-90 BL
- US 95
- SH-3
- SH-41
- SH-53
- SH-54
- SH-58
- SH-97

=== Transit ===
- Citylink
- Jefferson Lines

== Demographics ==
Historical population
Census	Pop.	Note	%±
1870	31		—
1880	518		1,571.0%
1890	4,108		693.1%
1900	10,216		148.7%
1910	22,747		122.7%
1920	17,878		−21.4%
1930	19,469		8.9%
1940	22,283		14.5%
1950	24,947		12.0%
1960	29,556		18.5%
1970	35,332		19.5%
1980	59,770		69.2%
1990	69,795		16.8%
2000	108,685		55.7%
2010	138,494		27.4%
2020	171,362		23.7%
2025 (est.)	191,864	▲	12.0%
U.S. Decennial Census; 1790–1960 1900–1990; 1990–2000 2010–2020

=== Racial and ethnic composition ===
Kootenai County, Idaho – Racial and ethnic composition Note: the US Census treats Hispanic/Latino as an ethnic category. This table excludes Latinos from the racial categories and assigns them to a separate category. Hispanics/Latinos may be of any race.
Race / Ethnicity (NH = Non-Hispanic)	Pop 1980	Pop 1990	Pop 2000	Pop 2010	Pop 2020	% 1980	% 1990	% 2000	% 2010	% 2020
White alone (NH)	58,227	67,717	102,570	127,454	149,107	97.42%	97.02%	94.37%	92.03%	87.01%
Black or African American alone (NH)	39	91	176	381	463	0.07%	0.13%	0.16%	0.28%	0.27%
Native American or Alaska Native alone (NH)	467	614	1,260	1,570	1,715	0.78%	0.88%	1.16%	1.13%	1.00%
Asian alone (NH)	197	310	527	925	1,371	0.33%	0.44%	0.48%	0.67%	0.80%
Native Hawaiian or Pacific Islander alone (NH)	x	x	64	117	195	x	x	0.06%	0.08%	0.11%
Other race alone (NH)	87	11	70	117	927	0.15%	0.02%	0.06%	0.08%	0.54%
Mixed race or Multiracial (NH)	x	x	1,490	2,662	8,828	x	x	1.37%	1.92%	5.15%
Hispanic or Latino (any race)	753	1,052	2,528	5,268	8,756	1.26%	1.51%	2.33%	3.80%	5.11%
Total	59,770	69,795	108,685	138,494	171,362	100.00%	100.00%	100.00%	100.00%	100.00%

=== 2020 census ===
As of the 2020 census, the county had a population of 171,362. The median age was 41.2 years, 22.9% of residents were under the age of 18, and 20.5% were 65 years of age or older. For every 100 females there were 97.7 males, and for every 100 females age 18 and over there were 95.5 males.

The racial makeup of the county was 89.0% White, 0.3% Black or African American, 1.1% American Indian and Alaska Native, 0.8% Asian, 0.1% Native Hawaiian and Pacific Islander, 1.4% from some other race, and 7.3% from two or more races. Hispanic or Latino residents of any race comprised 5.1% of the population.

76.5% of residents lived in urban areas, while 23.5% lived in rural areas.

There were 67,278 households in the county, of which 29.6% had children under the age of 18 living with them and 22.9% had a female householder with no spouse or partner present. About 24.4% of all households were made up of individuals and 11.8% had someone living alone who was 65 years of age or older.

There were 74,736 housing units, of which 10.0% were vacant. Among occupied housing units, 71.0% were owner-occupied and 29.0% were renter-occupied. The homeowner vacancy rate was 0.8% and the rental vacancy rate was 4.9%.

=== 2010 census ===
As of the 2010 census, there were 138,494 people, 54,200 households, and 37,316 families living in the county. The population density was 111.3 inhabitants per square mile (43.0/km^{2}). There were 63,177 housing units at an average density of 50.8 units per square mile (19.6 units/km^{2}). The racial makeup of the county was 94.5% white, 1.3% American Indian, 0.7% Asian, 0.3% black or African American, 0.1% Pacific islander, 0.8% from other races, and 2.4% from two or more races. Those of Hispanic or Latino origin made up 3.8% of the population. In terms of ancestry, 25.9% were German, 15.2% were Irish, 13.9% were English, 12.5% were American, and 6.7% were Norwegian.

Of the 54,200 households, 32.8% had children under the age of 18 living with them, 53.9% were married couples living together, 10.0% had a female householder with no husband present, 31.2% were non-families, and 24.3% of all households were made up of individuals. The average household size was 2.53 and the average family size was 2.99. The median age was 38.9 years.

The median income for a household in the county was $46,336 and the median income for a family was $55,840. Males had a median income of $43,503 versus $29,950 for females. The per capita income for the county was $24,418. About 8.8% of families and 11.9% of the population were below the poverty line, including 15.3% of those under age 18 and 7.7% of those age 65 or over.

=== 2000 census ===
As of the 2000 census, there were 108,685 people, 41,308 households, and 29,659 families living in the county. The population density was 87 people per square mile (34 people/km^{2}). There were 46,607 housing units at an average density of 37 units per square mile (14 units/km^{2}). The racial makeup of the county was 95.84% White, 0.17% Black or African American, 1.23% Native American, 0.50% Asian, 0.07% Pacific Islander, 0.59% from other races, and 1.60% from two or more races. 2.33% of the population were Hispanic or Latino of any race. 23.2% were of German, 11.9% English, 10.9% Irish, 9.4% American and 6.1% Norwegian ancestry. 96.6% spoke English and 1.7% Spanish as their first language.

There were 41,308 households, out of which 34.90% had children under the age of 18 living with them, 58.60% were married couples living together, 9.20% had a female householder with no husband present, and 28.20% were non-families. 21.90% of all households were made up of individuals, and 8.30% had someone living alone who was 65 years of age or older. The average household size was 2.60 and the average family size was 3.03.

In the county, the population was spread out, with 27.10% under the age of 18, 8.70% from 18 to 24, 28.00% from 25 to 44, 23.90% from 45 to 64, and 12.30% who were 65 years of age or older. The median age was 36 years. For every 100 females there were 98.10 males. For every 100 females age 18 and over, there were 94.90 males.

The median income for a household in the county was $37,754, and the median income for a family was $42,905. Males had a median income of $33,661 versus $22,113 for females. The per capita income for the county was $18,430. About 7.70% of families and 10.50% of the population were below the poverty line, including 12.90% of those under age 18 and 7.30% of those age 65 or over.

== Politics ==
Kootenai County, like the state of Idaho as a whole, is known for its conservative politics. Kootenai County votes reliably conservative, and races at the federal and state level are often noncompetitive; local county and city partisan races are sometimes even uncontested. The changing demographics of the county and region have altered the political landscape of the community and can be viewed as part of a nationwide ideological polarization trend. North Idaho had once been made up of largely progressive districts populated by a significant proportion of union laborers who worked the mines in the Silver Valley; these districts moderated, particularly in the 1980s, after mine and mill closures and union busting, and they had more competitive elections until the late 20th century. Coeur d'Alene is among a small group of cities in the United States that has elected a socialist mayor; they elected John T. Wood, a Socialist Party of America member, to office in 1911 on a campaign platform of clean water, better health and sanitation standards, and anti-corruption. Since the high-growth period beginning in the 1990s, continuing outmigration of conservatives from the west coast states has made elections in the two-party system less competitive over time as the newer residents see the city as a place that represents their social and political values, which are sometimes more conservative than the city as a whole. Many of the new migrants to the state of Idaho came from California, which accounted for over half the net in-migration between 1992 and 2000 and three of the top four counties that had out-migration to Kootenai County were from the birthplace of modern American conservatism in southern California–San Diego, Los Angeles, and Orange. While Kootenai was relatively competitive as late as the 1990s, it has raced to the right since despite its rapid population growth, with Republican candidate Donald Trump achieving nearly 75% of the vote, by far the best performance for the Republican Party in the county’s history.

United States presidential election results for Kootenai County, Idaho
Year	Republican		Democratic		Third party(ies)	
Year	No.	%	No.	%	No.	%
1892	713	47.95%	0	0.00%	774	52.05%
1896	334	18.77%	1,432	80.49%	13	0.73%
1900	1,472	44.03%	1,871	55.97%	0	0.00%
1904	4,165	67.55%	1,178	19.10%	823	13.35%
1908	4,407	55.03%	2,206	27.54%	1,396	17.43%
1912	1,690	23.47%	2,506	34.81%	3,004	41.72%
1916	2,741	42.68%	2,855	44.46%	826	12.86%
1920	3,518	65.93%	1,818	34.07%	0	0.00%
1924	3,289	44.84%	3,256	44.39%	790	10.77%
1928	4,973	69.90%	2,020	28.39%	121	1.70%
1932	2,813	34.05%	4,743	57.41%	706	8.55%
1936	2,586	28.74%	5,752	63.92%	661	7.35%
1940	4,333	41.42%	5,997	57.32%	132	1.26%
1944	4,388	42.93%	5,792	56.66%	42	0.41%
1948	4,265	41.56%	5,284	51.49%	713	6.95%
1952	7,272	56.93%	5,414	42.38%	88	0.69%
1956	7,330	54.38%	6,149	45.62%	0	0.00%
1960	6,704	46.40%	7,744	53.60%	0	0.00%
1964	6,096	42.60%	8,215	57.40%	0	0.00%
1968	7,092	48.01%	6,207	42.02%	1,472	9.97%
1972	9,958	61.33%	5,162	31.79%	1,118	6.89%
1976	10,493	57.78%	7,225	39.79%	441	2.43%
1980	17,022	63.25%	7,521	27.95%	2,369	8.80%
1984	17,330	64.93%	9,004	33.74%	355	1.33%
1988	15,093	55.63%	11,621	42.83%	416	1.53%
1992	13,065	35.96%	11,553	31.80%	11,710	32.23%
1996	18,740	47.82%	13,627	34.78%	6,819	17.40%
2000	28,162	64.28%	13,488	30.79%	2,162	4.93%
2004	36,173	66.25%	17,584	32.20%	846	1.55%
2008	38,387	61.38%	22,120	35.37%	2,028	3.24%
2012	39,381	65.09%	18,851	31.16%	2,273	3.76%
2016	44,449	67.03%	16,264	24.53%	5,597	8.44%
2020	62,837	69.91%	24,312	27.05%	2,729	3.04%
2024	72,059	74.40%	22,113	22.83%	2,676	2.76%

== Communities ==
=== Cities ===
- Athol
- Coeur d'Alene
- Dalton Gardens
- Fernan Lake Village
- Harrison
- Hauser
- Hayden
- Hayden Lake
- Huetter
- Post Falls
- Rathdrum
- Spirit Lake
- Stateline
- Worley

=== Census-designated places ===
- Conkling Park
- Rockford Bay

=== Unincorporated communities ===
- Bayview
- Cataldo
- Clarksville
- Garwood
- Lane
- Medimont
- North Pole

== Education ==
School districts include:

- Coeur d'Alene School District 271
- Kellogg Joint School District 391
- Kootenai Joint School District 274
- Lakeland Joint School District 272
- Plummer-Worley Joint School District 44
- Post Falls School District 273

It is in the catchment area, for North Idaho College; it is also the sole county in that community college district's taxation area.

== See also ==
- National Register of Historic Places listings in Kootenai County, Idaho
- Kootenai County Sheriff, Robert Norris
