= Spirit Lake, Idaho =

- City
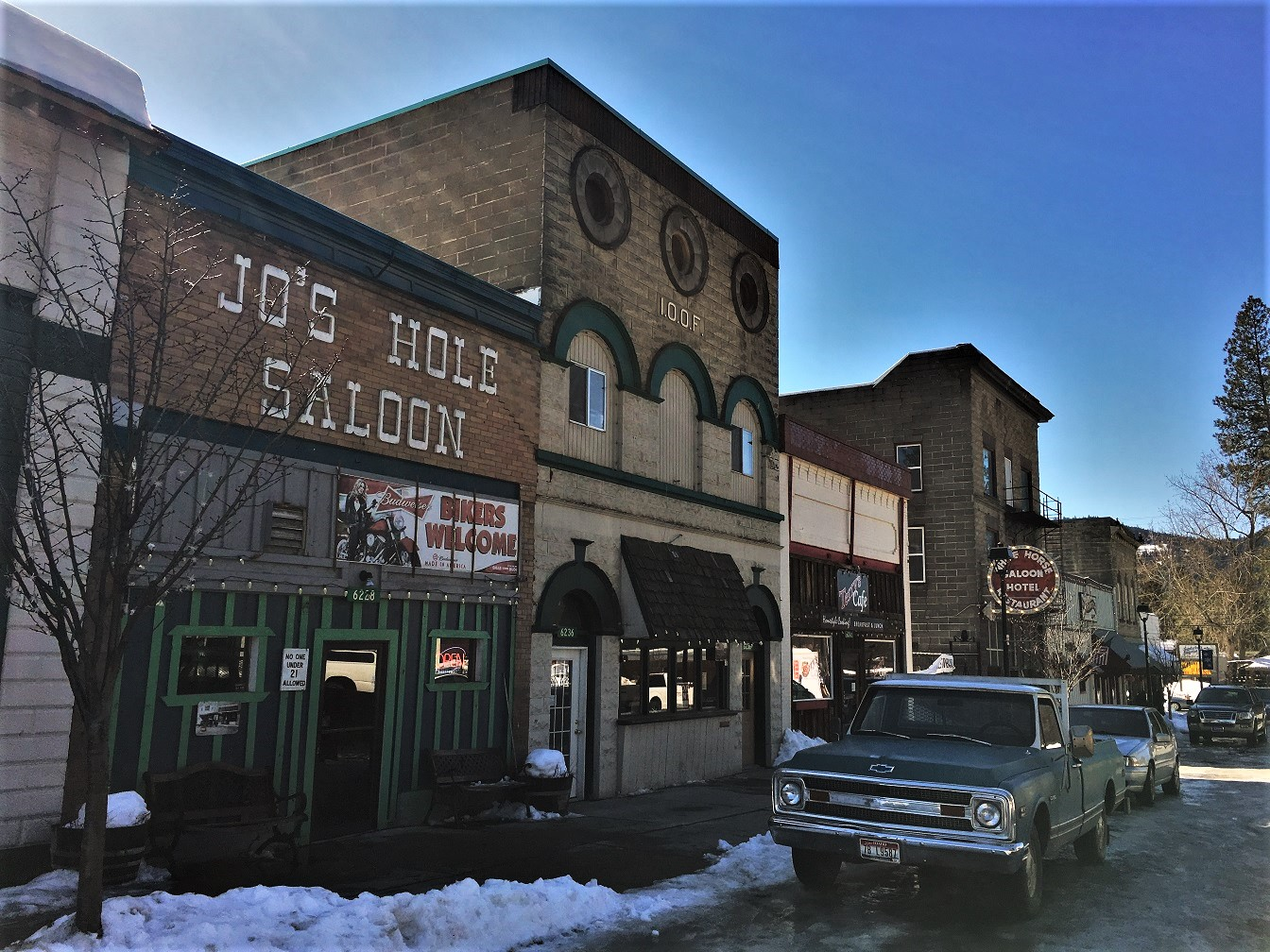
- Spirit Lake Historic District, March 2019

- Location of Spirit Lake in Kootenai County, Idaho.

- Location in the United States
- Coordinates: 47°57′56″N 116°52′45″W
- Country: United States
- State: Idaho
- County: Kootenai

Area
  - Total: 2.46 sq mi (6.36 km^{2})
  - Land: 2.46 sq mi (6.36 km^{2})
  - Water: 0 sq mi (0.00 km^{2})
- Elevation: 2,566 ft (782 m)

Population (2020)
  - Total: 2,337
  - Density: 1,031.3/sq mi (398.19/km^{2})
- Time zone: UTC-8 (Pacific (PST))
  - Summer (DST): UTC-7 (PDT)
- ZIP code: 83869
- Area code: 208
- FIPS code: 16-76060
- GNIS feature ID: 2411953
- Website: www.spiritlakeid.gov

Spirit Lake is a city in Kootenai County, Idaho. As of the 2020 census, Spirit Lake had a population of 2,337. It is part of the Coeur d'Alene Metropolitan Statistical Area, which includes the entire county.

== History ==
A post office called Spirit Lake has been in operation since 1903. The city took its name from nearby Spirit Lake.

== Geography ==
According to the United States Census Bureau, the city has a total area of 2.29 square miles (5.93 km^{2}), all land.

== Demographics ==
Historical population
| Census | Pop. | Note | %± |
|---|---|---|---|
| 1910 | 907 | | — |
| 1920 | 940 | | 3.6% |
| 1930 | 1,241 | | 32.0% |
| 1940 | 1,006 | | −18.9% |
| 1950 | 823 | | −18.2% |
| 1960 | 693 | | −15.8% |
| 1970 | 622 | | −10.2% |
| 1980 | 834 | | 34.1% |
| 1990 | 790 | | −5.3% |
| 2000 | 1,376 | | 74.2% |
| 2010 | 1,945 | | 41.4% |
| 2020 | 2,337 | | 20.2% |
| 2019 (est.) | 2,533 | | 30.2% |
U.S. Decennial Census

=== 2020 census ===
As of the 2020 census, Spirit Lake had a population of 2,337. The median age was 40.4 years. 24.6% of residents were under the age of 18 and 16.7% of residents were 65 years of age or older. For every 100 females there were 102.3 males, and for every 100 females age 18 and over there were 102.3 males age 18 and over.

0.0% of residents lived in urban areas, while 100.0% lived in rural areas.

There were 898 households in Spirit Lake, of which 32.5% had children under the age of 18 living in them. Of all households, 53.7% were married-couple households, 17.9% were households with a male householder and no spouse or partner present, and 20.6% were households with a female householder and no spouse or partner present. About 23.1% of all households were made up of individuals and 9.6% had someone living alone who was 65 years of age or older.

There were 973 housing units, of which 7.7% were vacant. The homeowner vacancy rate was 1.7% and the rental vacancy rate was 11.8%.

Racial composition as of the 2020 census
| Race | Number | Percent |
|---|---|---|
| White | 2,119 | 90.7% |
| Black or African American | 6 | 0.3% |
| American Indian and Alaska Native | 12 | 0.5% |
| Asian | 8 | 0.3% |
| Native Hawaiian and Other Pacific Islander | 1 | 0.0% |
| Some other race | 18 | 0.8% |
| Two or more races | 173 | 7.4% |
| Hispanic or Latino (of any race) | 129 | 5.5% |

=== 2010 census ===
As of the census of 2010, there were 1,945 people, 739 households, and 530 families living in the city. The population density was 849.3 inhabitants per square mile (327.9/km^{2}). There were 797 housing units at an average density of 348.0 per square mile (134.4/km^{2}). The racial makeup of the city was 96.3% White, 0.2% African American, 0.5% Native American, 0.4% Asian, 0.1% Pacific Islander, 0.6% from other races, and 1.9% from two or more races. Hispanic or Latino of any race were 2.8% of the population.

There were 739 households, of which 38.0% had children under the age of 18 living with them, 53.9% were married couples living together, 11.4% had a female householder with no husband present, 6.5% had a male householder with no wife present, and 28.3% were non-families. 22.6% of all households were made up of individuals, and 7.4% had someone living alone who was 65 years of age or older. The average household size was 2.63 and the average family size was 3.06.

The median age in the city was 37.8 years. 27.7% of residents were under the age of 18; 6.6% were between the ages of 18 and 24; 24.4% were from 25 to 44; 29.4% were from 45 to 64; and 11.9% were 65 years of age or older. The gender makeup of the city was 50.3% male and 49.7% female.

=== 2000 census ===
As of the census of 2000, there were 1,376 people, 517 households, and 369 families living in the city. The population density was 723.8 inhabitants per square mile (279.5/km^{2}). There were 587 housing units at an average density of 308.8 per square mile (119.2/km^{2}). The racial makeup of the city was 95.57% White, 0.15% African American, 0.65% Native American, 0.15% Asian, 0.07% Pacific Islander, 1.45% from other races, and 1.96% from two or more races. Hispanic or Latino of any race were 2.40% of the population.

There were 517 households, out of which 37.9% had children under the age of 18 living with them, 55.7% were married couples living together, 10.4% had a female householder with no husband present, and 28.6% were non-families. 22.8% of all households were made up of individuals, and 7.4% had someone living alone who was 65 years of age or older. The average household size was 2.66 and the average family size was 3.07.

In the city, the population was spread out, with 29.9% under the age of 18, 5.7% from 18 to 24, 30.1% from 25 to 44, 24.2% from 45 to 64, and 10.1% who were 65 years of age or older. The median age was 36 years. For every 100 females, there were 94.6 males. For every 100 females age 18 and over, there were 98.8 males.

The median income for a household in the city was $28,854, and the median income for a family was $32,337. Males had a median income of $25,875 versus $18,092 for females. The per capita income for the city was $13,592. About 11.6% of families and 16.4% of the population were below the poverty line, including 20.8% of those under age 18 and 6.3% of those age 65 or over.

== Education ==
- Timberlake High School
- Timberlake Junior High School
- Spirit Lake Elementary School

== Notable residents ==
- Bobby Jenks, MLB pitcher

== See also ==
- List of cities in Idaho
