= Athol, Idaho =

City in Kootenai County, Idaho, United States

- City
- Location of Athol in Kootenai County, Idaho.

- Location in the United States
- Coordinates: 47°56′49″N 116°42′28″W
- Country: United States
- State: Idaho
- County: Kootenai
- Incorporated: 1909

Area
  - Total: 0.89 sq mi (2.30 km^{2})
  - Land: 0.89 sq mi (2.30 km^{2})
  - Water: 0 sq mi (0.00 km^{2})
- Elevation: 2,392 ft (729 m)

Population (2020)
  - Total: 709
  - Density: 796.6/sq mi (307.58/km^{2})
- Time zone: UTC-8 (Pacific (PST))
  - Summer (DST): UTC-7 (PDT)
- ZIP code: 83801
- Area code: 208
- FIPS code: 16-03700
- GNIS feature ID: 2409748
- Website: cityofathol.us

Athol (/ˈæ θəl/ AH-thol) is a city in Kootenai County, Idaho, United States. The population was 709 at the 2020 census, up from 692 in the 2010 census. It is part of the Coeur d'Alene Metropolitan Statistical Area, which includes the entire county. Its main attraction is Silverwood Theme Park.

== Description ==
Athol contains the Silverwood Theme Park. Several miles east of the city is the historic Farragut State Park, located at the southern end of Lake Pend Oreille. In March 2022, Dollar General opened its first storefront in the state of Idaho in Athol.

== History ==
The Athol Post Office has been in operation since 1895. The city may be named after the Duke of Atholl.

The City of Athol website details a brief history as follows:

Until the early 1800s, when explorers/trappers began coming into the area, Native American tribes, primarily of the Coeur d’Alene and Spokane Tribes, had exclusive use of the land as they migrated through the region en route to their encampments near the area's many lakes and streams.

All this changed when the Northern Pacific Railroad station was built in Athol in 1882, and settlers hoped for a vast agricultural paradise. The depot was established in Athol on its line between Hauser Junction and Sandpoint. In 1895, town residents, consisting mostly of railroad employees and homesteaders, successfully petitioned postal authorities for a post office.

The white pine forest first attracted early settlers to Athol, and logging, milling, and agriculture created prosperity. However, the location of the new community was on state lands. In 1903, lots in Athol were auctioned by the state. State surveyors platted the new township, but apparently did not record the change in ownership. For many years, the town's residents did not have title to their land. Eventually, the state corrected the problem.

Athol was first known as Colton; the town was renamed Athol by a settler who came from Athol, Massachusetts, which was named after a town in Scotland named for the Duke of Atholl. No one knows for sure if Athol, Idaho, was named by a descendant of the same family or if the name was just brought west during the 19th century.

In 1900, the Methodist congregation built a church that also served as a school until 1902, when school patrons built their first school building. In December 1902, Hackett & Wilson opened a sawmill near the city. The mill became the city's largest employer and had the capacity to produce 25,000 board feet of lumber per day. By 1903, there were many businesses open, including the Pacific Hotel, a drugstore, a smithy, a jewelry store, restaurants, a mercantile company, and a saloon.

Athol's first water well was dug by hand by Joe Pricsha and his crew. It was over 350 feet deep. They dug into a large boulder, so they had to dig around it, which made a curve in the shaft. A 5 hp pump motor was installed, which supplied the town with water. Later, another shaft with a larger pump was installed in the same hand-dug hole.

== Geography ==
According to the United States Census Bureau, the city has a total area of 0.79 square miles (2.05 km^{2}), all of it being land.

== Demographics ==
Historical population
Census	Pop.	Note	%±
1910	281		—
1920	180		−35.9%
1930	116		−35.6%
1940	120		3.4%
1950	226		88.3%
1960	214		−5.3%
1970	190		−11.2%
1980	312		64.2%
1990	346		10.9%
2000	676		95.4%
2010	692		2.4%
2020	709		2.5%
U.S. Decennial Census

As of 2000, the median income for a household in the city was $30,595, and the median income for a family was $31,875. Males had a median income of $28,438 versus $17,813 for females. The per capita income for the city was $13,632. About 11.0% of families and 14.5% of the population were below the poverty line, including 10.3% of those under age 18 and 23.7% of those age 65 or over.

=== 2010 census ===
As of the census of 2010, there were 692 people, 282 households, and 176 families residing in the city. The population density was 875.9 inhabitants per square mile (338.2/km^{2}). There were 305 housing units at an average density of 386.1 per square mile (149.1/km^{2}). The racial makeup of the city was 97.0% White, 0.9% Native American, and 2.2% from two or more races. Hispanic or Latino of any race were 0.3% of the population.

There were 282 households, of which 29.4% had children under the age of 18 living with them, 47.9% were married couples living together, 8.9% had a female householder with no husband present, 5.7% had a male householder with no wife present, and 37.6% were non-families. 28.0% of all households were made up of individuals, and 10.3% had someone living alone who was 65 years of age or older. The average household size was 2.45, and the average family size was 3.05.

The median age in the city was 41.8 years. 23.7% of residents were under the age of 18; 6.7% were between the ages of 18 and 24; 23.2% were from 25 to 44; 30.8% were from 45 to 64; and 15.6% were 65 years of age or older. The gender makeup of the city was 52.2% male and 47.8% female.

== Notable person ==
- Hattie Johnson, Olympic shooter, resident of Athol

== See also ==
- List of cities in Idaho
- Duke of Atholl
- Athol, Massachusetts
