= Rathdrum, Idaho =

- City
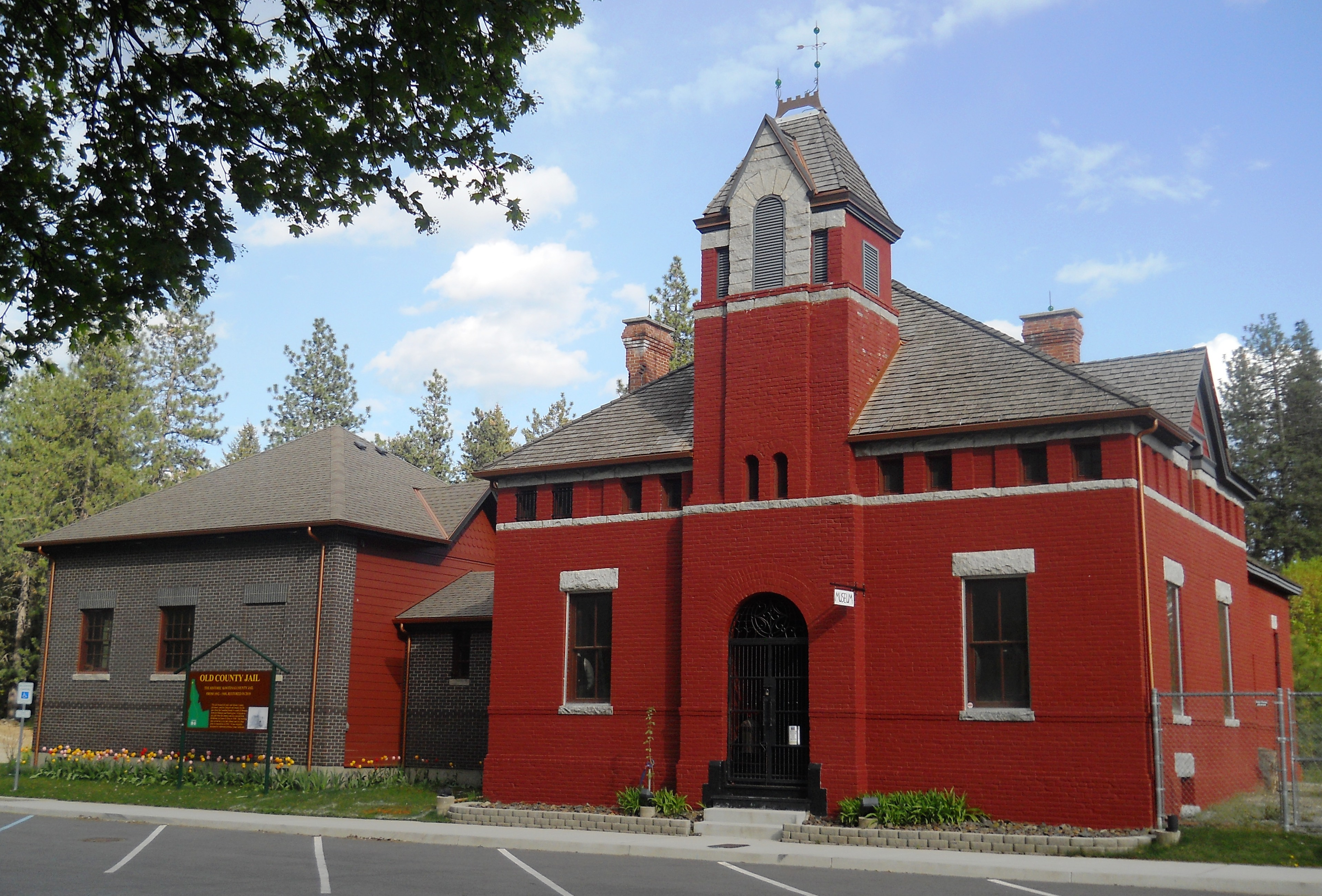
- Old County Jail Museum

- Location of Rathdrum in Kootenai County, Idaho.

- Location in the United States
- Coordinates: 47°48′30″N 116°53′35″W
- Country: United States
- State: Idaho
- County: Kootenai

Area
  - Land: 6.54 sq mi (16.9 km^{2})
- Elevation: 2,215 ft (675 m)

Population (2020)
  - Total: 9,211
  - Estimate (2025): 13,227
  - Density: 1,408.4/sq mi (543.8/km^{2})
- Time zone: UTC-8 (Pacific (PST))
  - Summer (DST): UTC-7 (PDT)
- ZIP code: 83858
- Area code: 208
- FIPS code: 16-66340
- GNIS feature ID: 2411521
- Website: www.rathdrum.gov

Rathdrum is a city in Kootenai County, Idaho, United States. The population was 9,211 at the 2020 census, up from 6,826 in 2010. It is part of the Coeur d'Alene Metropolitan Statistical Area, which includes the entire county. It is named after Rathdrum, a village in County Wicklow, Ireland.

According to the United States Census Bureau, the city has a total area of 6.54 square miles (16.94 km^{2}), all land.

Rathdrum is situated at the base of Rathdrum Mountain, which is part of the Selkirk Mountain Range.

== History ==
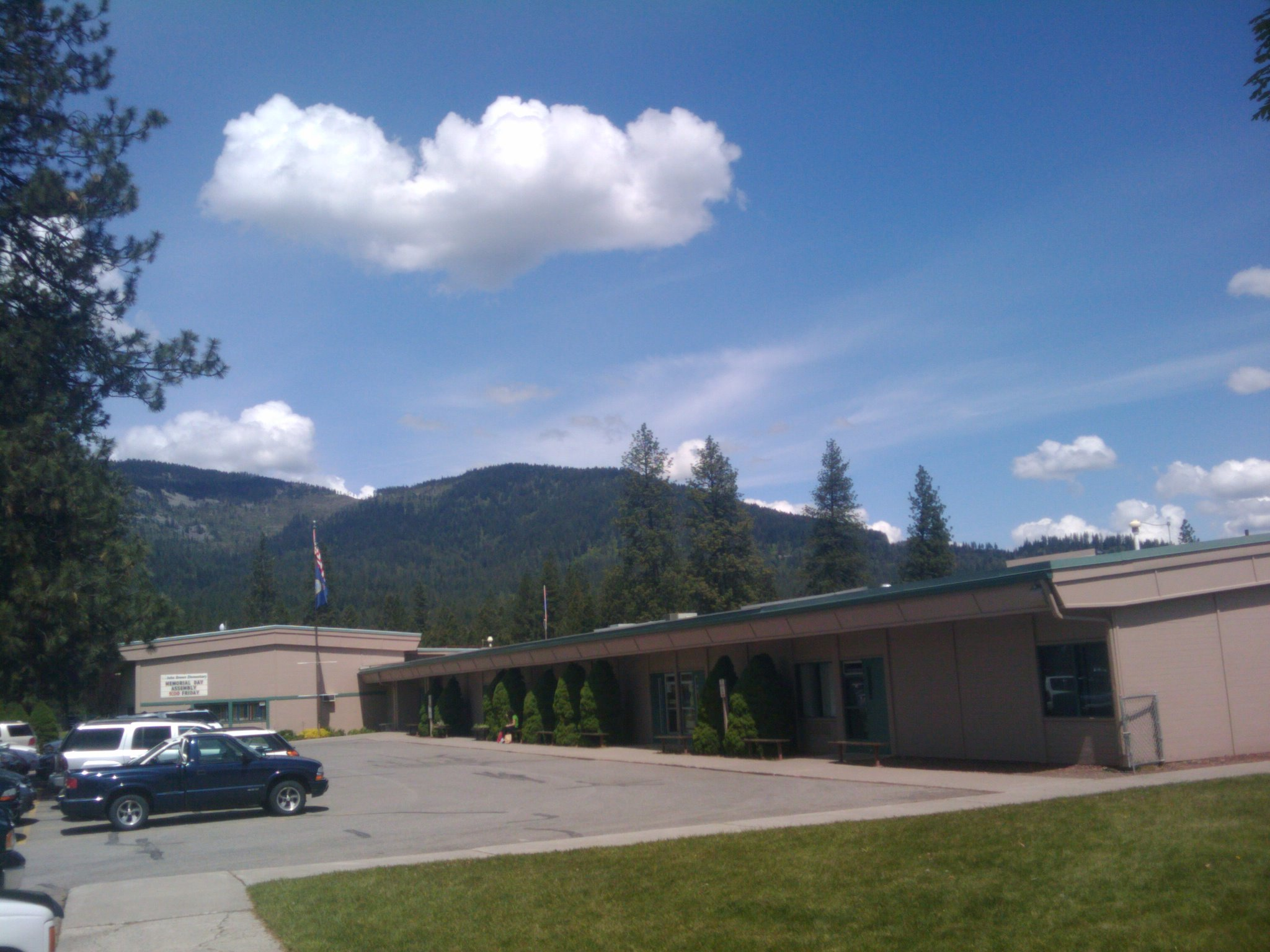
The intermediate grade wing of Rathdrum's elementary school, John Brown

In the 1800s the town was initially called Westwood in honor of one of the founders of the town, a Pony Express rider and rancher, Charles Wesley Wood, also known as "Wes." But in 1881 the postmaster in the town was informed by the federal government that the town would need to change its name since it was already taken by another town in the territory. A local businessman, Michael M. Cowley, recommended the name "Rathdrum" from County Wicklow in Ireland, his place of birth.

Near the end of the 19th century, the Northern Pacific Railway built its line westwards to Spokane and Rathdrum started to grow slowly. Until today, Rathdrum remains on the only regular railway line in Idaho, now owned by BNSF Railway; the Empire Builder of Amtrak travels through Rathdrum without stopping there.

== Demographics ==
Historical population
Census	Pop.	Note	%±
1890	218		—
1900	407		86.7%
1910	725		78.1%
1920	509		−29.8%
1930	496		−2.6%
1940	511		3.0%
1950	610		19.4%
1960	710		16.4%
1970	741		4.4%
1980	1,369		84.8%
1990	2,000		46.1%
2000	4,816		140.8%
2010	6,826		41.7%
2020	9,211		34.9%
2025 (est.)	13,227		43.6%
U.S. Decennial Census

=== 2020 census ===
As of the 2020 census, Rathdrum had a population of 9,211. The population density was 1,408.4 inhabitants per square mile (543.8/km^{2}). The median age was 35.9 years. 27.2% of residents were under the age of 18 and 16.3% of residents were 65 years of age or older. For every 100 females there were 96.1 males, and for every 100 females age 18 and over there were 96.1 males age 18 and over.

99.4% of residents lived in urban areas, while 0.6% lived in rural areas.

There were 3,356 households in Rathdrum, of which 37.9% had children under the age of 18 living in them. Of all households, 56.3% were married-couple households, 15.5% were households with a male householder and no spouse or partner present, and 21.1% were households with a female householder and no spouse or partner present. About 20.1% of all households were made up of individuals and 9.8% had someone living alone who was 65 years of age or older.

There were 3,454 housing units, of which 2.8% were vacant. The homeowner vacancy rate was 0.8% and the rental vacancy rate was 3.2%.

Racial composition as of the 2020 census
Race	Number	Percent
White	8,174	88.7%
Black or African American	18	0.2%
American Indian and Alaska Native	94	1.0%
Asian	53	0.6%
Native Hawaiian and Other Pacific Islander	13	0.1%
Some other race	118	1.3%
Two or more races	741	8.0%
Hispanic or Latino (of any race)	442	4.8%

== See also ==
- Lakeland High School
- Hauser Refueling Facility
