= National Register of Historic Places listings in Kootenai County, Idaho =

Location of Kootenai County in Idaho

This is a list of the National Register of Historic Places listings in Kootenai County, Idaho.

This is intended to be a complete list of the properties and districts on the National Register of Historic Places in Kootenai County, Idaho, United States. Latitude and longitude coordinates are provided for many National Register properties and districts; these locations may be seen together in a map.

There are 46 properties and districts listed on the National Register in the county, including 1 National Historic Landmark. More may be added; properties and districts nationwide are added to the Register weekly.

This National Park Service list is complete through NPS recent listings posted November 6, 2026.

== Current listings ==
	Name on the Register	Image	Date listed	Location	City or town	Description
1	Bayview School II	Bayview School II	September 12, 1985 (#85002090)	Careywood Rd. 47°59′02″N 116°33′46″W	Bayview	
2	Bellgrove School II	Bellgrove School II	September 12, 1985 (#85002091)	Hamaker Rd. 47°31′53″N 116°54′54″W	Rockford Bay	
3	Carousel Arabian Ranch		November 12, 2026 (#100013592)	4175 West Cougar Gulch Road; 47°39′39″N 116°50′28″W	Coeur d'Alene vicinity	
4	Cataldo Mission	Cataldo Mission	October 15, 1966 (#66000312)	Off Interstate 90; 47°32′55″N 116°21′30″W	Cataldo	
5	Cave Lake School	Cave Lake School	September 12, 1985 (#85002092)	State Highway 3; 47°25′20″N 116°36′32″W	Medimont	
6	Cedar Mountain School	Cedar Mountain School	September 12, 1985 (#85002093)	Parks and Lewellyn Creek Rd. 47°55′34″N 116°38′06″W	Athol	
7	Clark House	Clark House	December 12, 1978 (#78001070)	On Hayden Lake; 47°45′22″N 116°43′34″W	Clarksville	
8	Coeur d'Alene City Hall	Coeur d'Alene City Hall	August 3, 1979 (#79000792)	5th and Sherman Sts. 47°40′23″N 116°46′48″W	Coeur d'Alene	
9	Coeur d'Alene Federal Building	Coeur d'Alene Federal Building	December 16, 1977 (#77000461)	4th and Lakeside; 47°40′28″N 116°46′53″W	Coeur d'Alene	
10	Coeur d'Alene Garden District Historic District	Coeur d'Alene Garden District Historic District	April 15, 2025 (#100010923)	Roughly bounded by N. 11th St., Montana Ave., N. 5th St. and Lakeside Ave; 47°40′42″N 116°46′31″W	Coeur d'Alene	
11	Coeur d'Alene Masonic Temple	Coeur d'Alene Masonic Temple	May 22, 1978 (#78001071)	525 Sherman Ave. 47°40′23″N 116°46′43″W	Coeur d'Alene	
12	Cougar Gulch School III	Cougar Gulch School III	September 12, 1985 (#85002094)	Cougar Gulch Rd. 47°38′12″N 116°55′20″W	Post Falls	
13	Silas W. and Elizabeth Crane House	Silas W. and Elizabeth Crane House	December 9, 1999 (#99001476)	201 S. Coeur d'Alene Ave. 47°27′12″N 116°47′09″W	Harrison	
14	Harvey M. Davey House	Harvey M. Davey House	May 23, 1985 (#85001126)	315 Wallace Ave. 47°40′37″N 116°46′54″W	Coeur d'Alene	
15	East Hayden Lake School II	East Hayden Lake School II	September 12, 1985 (#85002095)	Hayden Lake Rd. 47°47′11″N 116°40′32″W	Camp Mivoden	
16	John A. Finch Caretaker's House	John A. Finch Caretaker's House	September 14, 1987 (#87001562)	2160 Finch Rd. 47°45′30″N 116°45′23″W	Hayden Lake	
17	First United Methodist Church	First United Methodist Church	June 18, 1979 (#79000793)	618 Wallace Ave. 47°40′35″N 116°46′37″W	Coeur d'Alene	
18	Fort Sherman Buildings	Fort Sherman Buildings	October 25, 1979 (#79000794)	North Idaho College campus 47°40′38″N 116°47′51″W	Coeur d'Alene	
19	John P. and Stella Gray House	John P. and Stella Gray House	March 31, 1988 (#88000272)	521 S. 13th St. 47°40′08″N 116°46′06″W	Coeur d'Alene	
20	Boyd and Alta Hamilton House	Boyd and Alta Hamilton House	October 28, 2021 (#100007118)	627 North Government Way; 47°40′42″N 116°47′11″W	Coeur d'Alene	
21	Harrison Commercial Historic District	Harrison Commercial Historic District	December 20, 1996 (#96001505)	Roughly bounded by N. Lake Ave., W. Harrison St., N. Coeur d'Alene., and Pine St. 47°27′15″N 116°47′11″W	Harrison	
22	Indian Springs School II	Indian Springs School II	September 12, 1985 (#85002096)	State Highway 3; 47°25′20″N 116°37′23″W	Medimont	
23	Inland Empire Electric Railway Substation	Inland Empire Electric Railway Substation	June 27, 1975 (#75000633)	Mullan Rd. and Northwest Boulevard; 47°40′32″N 116°47′19″W	Coeur d'Alene	
24	Kootenai County Courthouse	Kootenai County Courthouse	December 23, 1977 (#77000462)	501 Government Way; 47°40′38″N 116°47′12″W	Coeur d'Alene	
25	Kootenai County Jail	Kootenai County Jail	August 10, 2001 (#01000834)	802 2nd St. 47°48′40″N 116°53′40″W	Rathdrum	
26	Lane School II	Lane School II	September 12, 1985 (#85002097)	Lanz Rd. 47°30′25″N 116°32′05″W	Lane	
27	McGuires School	McGuires School	September 12, 1985 (#85002098)	Corbin Rd. and Old Highway 10; 47°43′01″N 116°59′29″W	McGuire	Destroyed by fire in 1987.
28	Mooney–Dahlberg Farmstead	Mooney–Dahlberg Farmstead	December 30, 2009 (#09001163)	5803 Riverview Dr. 47°41′23″N 116°50′59″W	Coeur d'Alene	
29	Mullan Road	Mullan Road	April 5, 1990 (#90000548)	3 segments: between Alder Creek and Cedar Creek; Fourth of July Pass between Interstate 80 and old U.S. Route 10; Heyburn State Park; 47°37′10″N 116°31′06″W	Coeur d'Alene	Extends into Benewah County
30	Pen d'Oreille City	Pen d'Oreille City	November 19, 2019 (#100004674)	Address Restricted	Athol	
31	Pleasant View School II	Pleasant View School II	September 12, 1985 (#85002099)	Pleasant View Rd. 47°41′27″N 117°00′09″W	Pleasant View	
32	Post Falls Community United Presbyterian Church	Post Falls Community United Presbyterian Church	September 7, 1984 (#84003851)	4th and William Sts. 47°42′41″N 116°56′43″W	Post Falls	
33	Prairie School II	Prairie School II	September 12, 1985 (#85002100)	Prairie Ave. 47°44′40″N 116°51′33″W	Coeur d'Alene	
34	Rathdrum State Bank	Rathdrum State Bank	November 8, 1974 (#74000742)	Main and Mill Sts. 47°48′41″N 116°53′49″W	Rathdrum	Building no longer exists.
35	Roosevelt School	Roosevelt School	July 30, 1976 (#76000676)	1st and Wallace Sts. 47°40′38″N 116°47′06″W	Coeur d'Alene	
36	Rose Lake School II	Rose Lake School II	September 12, 1985 (#85002101)	Queen St. and State Highway 3; 47°32′19″N 116°28′25″W	Rose Lake	
37	St. Stanislaus Kostka Mission	St. Stanislaus Kostka Mission	November 17, 1977 (#77000464)	McCartney and 2nd Sts. 47°48′38″N 116°53′43″W	Rathdrum	
38	St. Thomas Catholic Church	St. Thomas Catholic Church	October 5, 1977 (#77000463)	919 Indiana Ave. 47°40′34″N 116°46′25″W	Coeur d'Alene	
39	Sherman Park Addition	Sherman Park Addition	April 27, 1992 (#92000418)	Bounded by Garden Ave., Hubbard St., Lakeshore Dr., and Park Dr. 47°40′33″N 116°47′36″W	Coeur d'Alene	
40	Spirit Lake Historic District	Spirit Lake Historic District	February 8, 1979 (#79000795)	Maine St. 47°57′55″N 116°52′13″W	Spirit Lake	
41	Spokane Valley Land and Water Company Canal	Spokane Valley Land and Water Company Canal	March 20, 2003 (#03000124)	Diverts in Falls Park, 4th St. 47°42′44″N 116°57′20″W	Post Falls	
42	Jacob and Cristina Thunborg House		September 12, 1985 (#85002156)	Chicken Point; 47°46′51″N 116°40′59″W	Hayden Lake	
43	Treaty Rock	Treaty Rock	April 30, 1992 (#92000420)	North of Interstate 90, northeast of the Spokane River falls 47°42′48″N 116°57′06″W	Post Falls	
44	Upper Twin Lakes School	Upper Twin Lakes School	September 12, 1985 (#85002102)	Twin Lakes Rd. 47°53′40″N 116°54′43″W	Silver Sands Beach	
45	Washington Water Power Bridges	Washington Water Power Bridges	December 20, 1996 (#96001507)	0.5 miles west of the junction of Spokane and 4th Sts. 47°42′40″N 116°57′12″W; 47°42′41″N 116°57′22″W	Post Falls	
46	Samuel and Ann Young House	Samuel and Ann Young House	July 9, 1997 (#97000765)	120 4th Ave. 47°42′39″N 116°56′49″W	Post Falls	

== See also ==
- List of National Historic Landmarks in Idaho
- National Register of Historic Places listings in Idaho
