= Jacob and Cristina Thunborg House =

- U.S. National Register of Historic Places
- Location within Idaho Location within the United States
- Nearest city: Hayden Lake, Idaho
- Coordinates: 47°46′51″N 116°40′59″W
- Area: 0.5 acres (0.20 ha)
- Built: 1893
- Built by: Jacob Thunborg
- Architectural style: Log pen
- NRHP reference No.: 85002156
- Added to NRHP: September 12, 1985

The Jacob and Cristina Thunborg House is a historic log cabin located at Chicken Point in Hayden Lake, Idaho. It was built in 1893-1902 by Jacob Thunborg and his wife Cristina, two Swedish immigrants who became homesteaders in Idaho. The Thunborgs lived here with their son, Frank, and their daughter, Lena. It was inherited by their daughter-in-law, Frances Thunborg, who lived here until 1960. The house has been listed on the National Register of Historic Places since September 12, 1985.
