= John A. Finch Caretaker's House =

- Finch, John A., Caretaker's House
- U.S. National Register of Historic Places
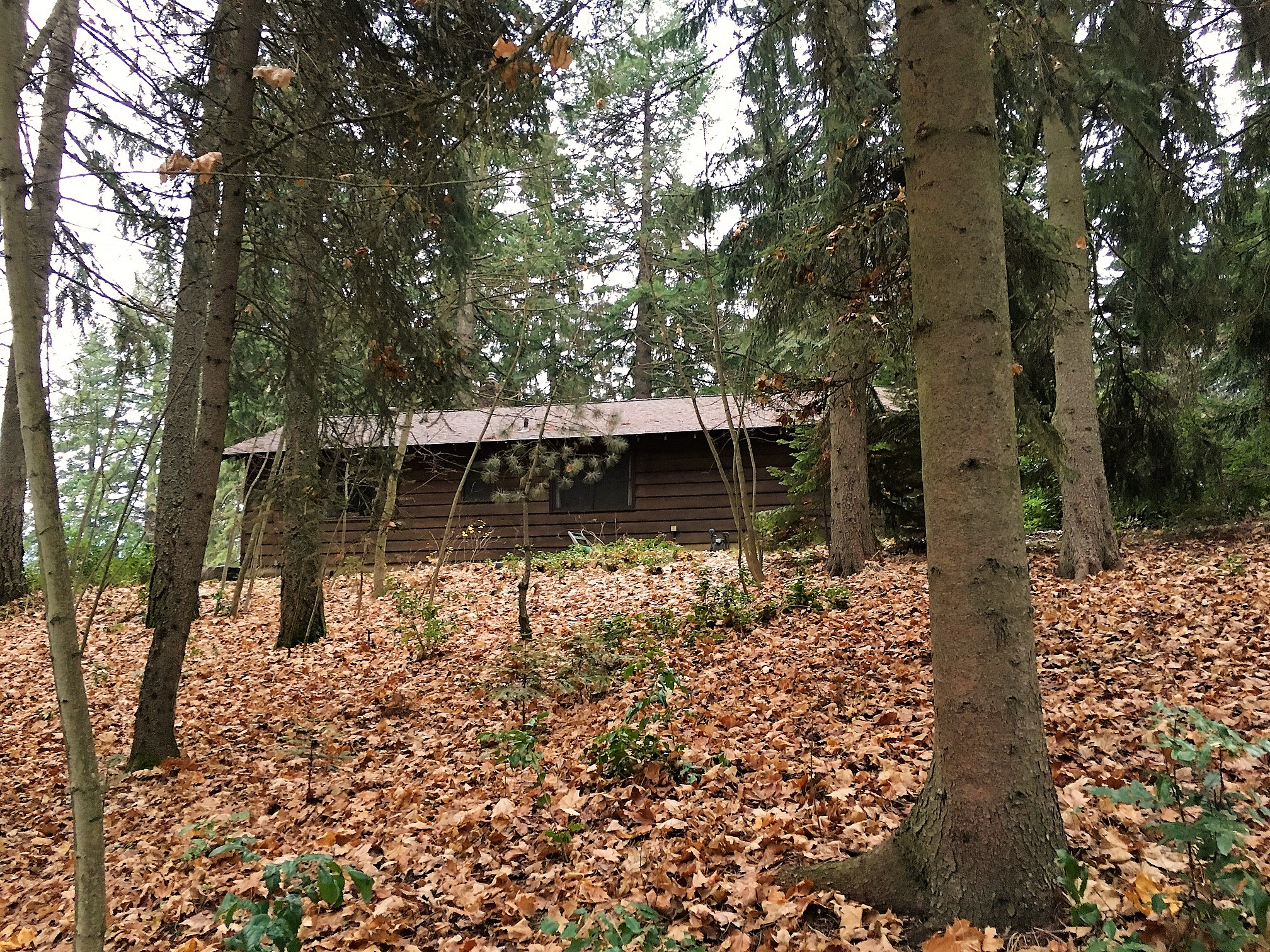
- The house in 2016

- Location within Idaho Location within the United States
- Location: 2160 Finch Road, Hayden Lake, Idaho
- Coordinates: 47°45′30″N 116°45′23″W
- Area: 0.7 acres (0.28 ha)
- Built: 1903
- Architect: Kirtland Cutter
- Architectural style: Swiss Chalet
- NRHP reference No.: 87001562
- Added to NRHP: September 14, 1987

The John A. Finch Caretaker's House is a historic house in Hayden Lake, Idaho. It was built in 1903 for John A. Finch, a significant investor in Coeur d'Alene's mines. It was designed in the Swiss Chalet style by architect Kirtland Cutter. It has been listed on the National Register of Historic Places since September 14, 1987.
