= Clark House (Clarksville, Idaho) =

- U.S. National Register of Historic Places
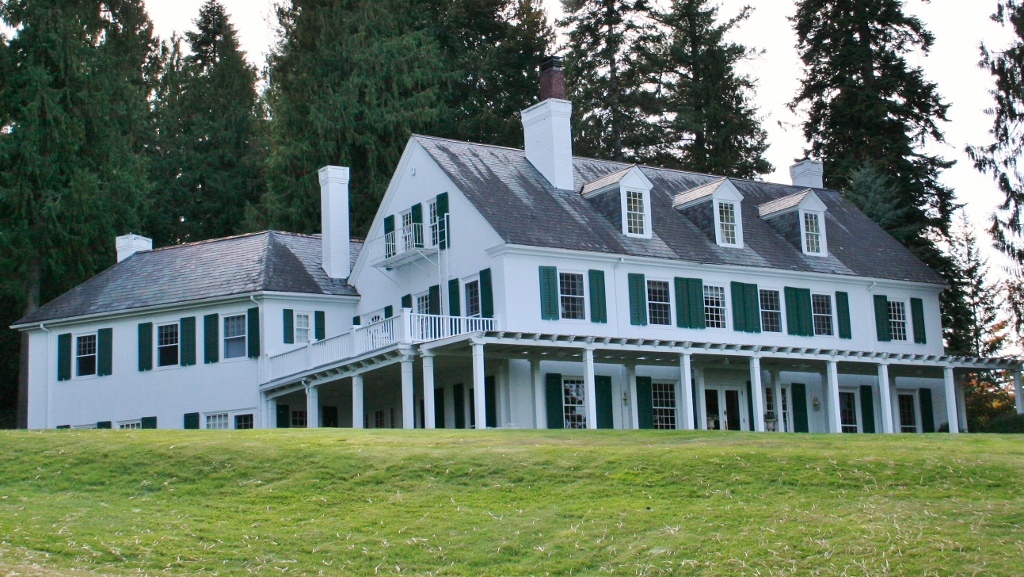
- The house in 2014

- Location within Idaho Location within the United States
- Location: On Hayden Lake, Hayden Lake, Idaho
- Coordinates: 47°45′22″N 116°43′31″W
- Area: 5 acres (2.0 ha)
- Built: 1912
- Architect: George Canning Wales
- Architectural style: American Colonial
- NRHP reference No.: 78001070
- Added to NRHP: December 12, 1978

The Clark House is a historic house in Hayden Lake, Idaho. It was built in 1910 as a summer residence for F. Lewis Clark, a mining millionaire who disappeared in Santa Barbara in 1914 and was believed to have committed suicide. Clark's servants lived in the wings. The house was designed in the American colonial style and has been attributed to architect Kirtland Cutter; however, blueprints discovered in Boise, ID show that the actual architect was George Canning Wales of Boston. It has been listed on the National Register of Historic Places since December 12, 1978.

Since its construction, in addition to serving as a residence, it has been used as a boys home, convalescent center for patients from the Farragut Naval Hospital, resort, and a restaurant before falling into disrepair. After being vacant for 20 years, the Kootenai County scheduled the building to be used in a burn exercise in 1988. The mansion was purchased in 1989 by Monty Danner, a corporate executive from California who restored the house.
