= St. Thomas Catholic Church (Coeur d'Alene, Idaho) =

Historic church in Idaho, United States

- U.S. National Register of Historic Places
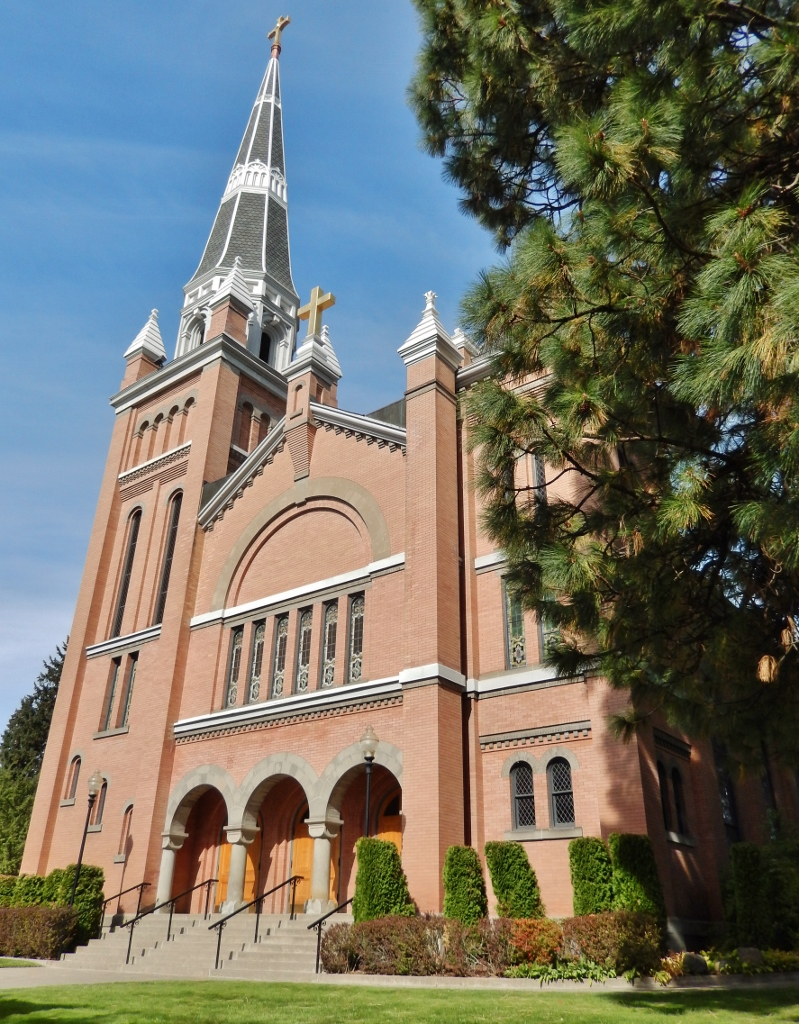
- The church in 2014

- Location within Idaho Location within the United States
- Location: 919 Indiana Avenue, Coeur d'Alene, Idaho
- Coordinates: 47°40′34″N 116°46′20″W
- Area: less than one acre
- Built: 1909
- Architect: Francis P. Rooney, Lewis P. Stritesky
- Architectural style: Romanesque Revival
- NRHP reference No.: 77000463
- Added to NRHP: October 5, 1977

St. Thomas Catholic Church is parish of the Roman Catholic Church in Coeur d'Alene, Idaho. Founded in 1890 to serve the Catholic miners and lumber workers relocating to the area, it remains an active congregation of the Diocese of Boise.

It is noted for its historic parish church, built in 1909 by E. M. Kreig with bricks from Sandpoint, Idaho, with the arch built with sandstones from Tenino, Washington. The building was designed in the Romanesque Revival style by architects Francis P. Rooney and Lewis P. Stritesky, and the stained glass was designed by G. C. Riordan & Company. It has been listed on the National Register of Historic Places since October 5, 1977.
