= George Williams (Idaho architect) =

American architect

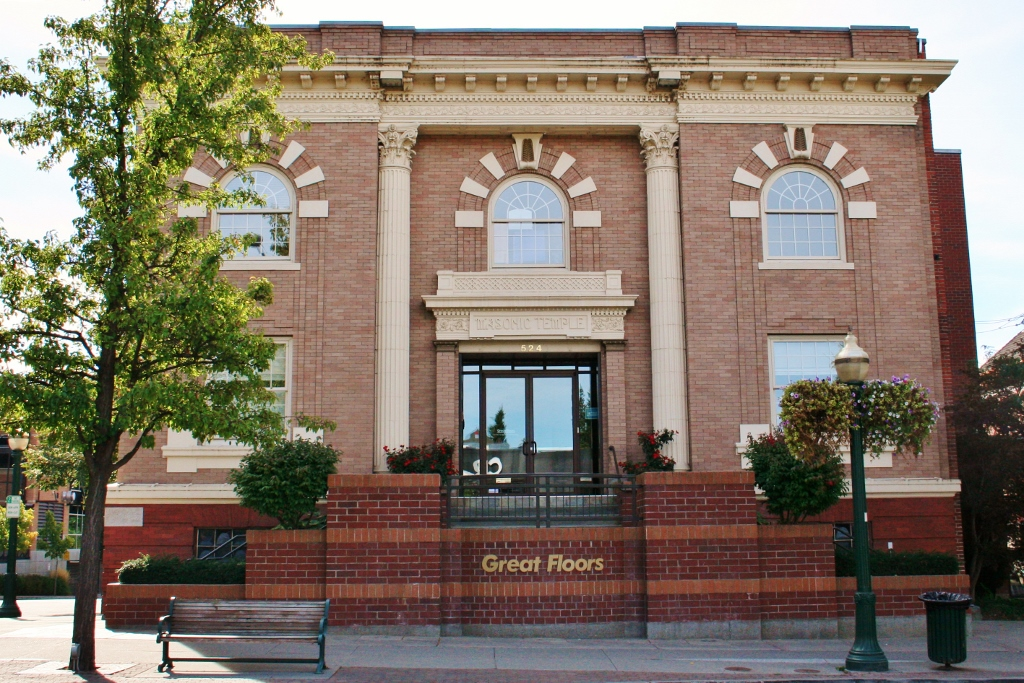
The Coeur d'Alene Masonic Temple, designed by Williams in 1909 and completed in 1911.

George Williams (November 11, 1859 or 1860 in Kewanee, Illinois – December 22, 1929 in Coeur d'Alene, Idaho) was an American architect based in Coeur d'Alene, Idaho. He was born in Illinois and moved to Coeur D'Alene in 1903.

A number of his works are listed on the National Register of Historic Places.

Works include:

- Roosevelt School, Coeur d'Alene, Idaho (1905, NRHP 1976)
- First United Methodist Church, Coeur d'Alene, Idaho (1906, NRHP 1979)
- Coeur d'Alene City Hall, Coeur d'Alene, Idaho (1908, NRHP 1979)
- Coeur d'Alene Masonic Temple, Coeur d'Alene, Idaho (1909–11, NRHP 1978)
