= Silas W. and Elizabeth Crane House =

Historic place in Idaho, United States

- Silas W. Crane and Elizabeth Crane House
- U.S. National Register of Historic Places
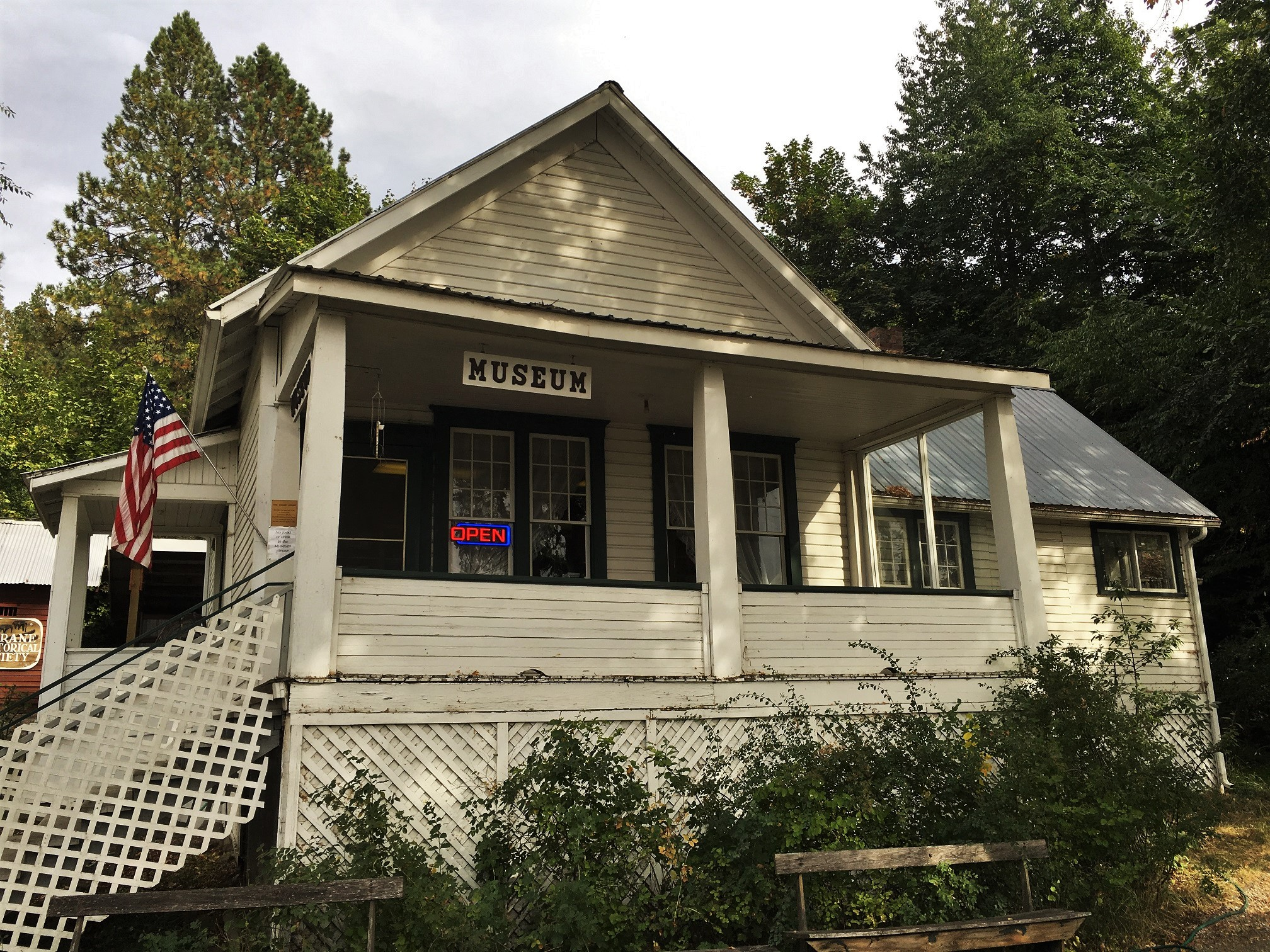
- The house in 2018

- Location within Idaho Location within the United States
- Location: 201 South Coeur d'Alene Avenue, Harrison, Idaho
- Coordinates: 47°27′08″N 116°47′04″W
- Area: less than one acre
- Built: 1891
- Architectural style: American Craftsman
- NRHP reference No.: 99001476
- Added to NRHP: December 9, 1999

The Silas W. and Elizabeth Crane House is a historic house in Harrison, Idaho. It was built in 1891 for settlers Silas W. Crane and his wife Elizabeth. The Cranes lived here with their three sons, Addison, Edwin and William. It was first designed in the Queen Anne architectural style, and later redesigned in the American Craftsman style. It has been listed on the National Register of Historic Places since December 9, 1999.
