= Coeur d'Alene City Hall =

- U.S. National Register of Historic Places
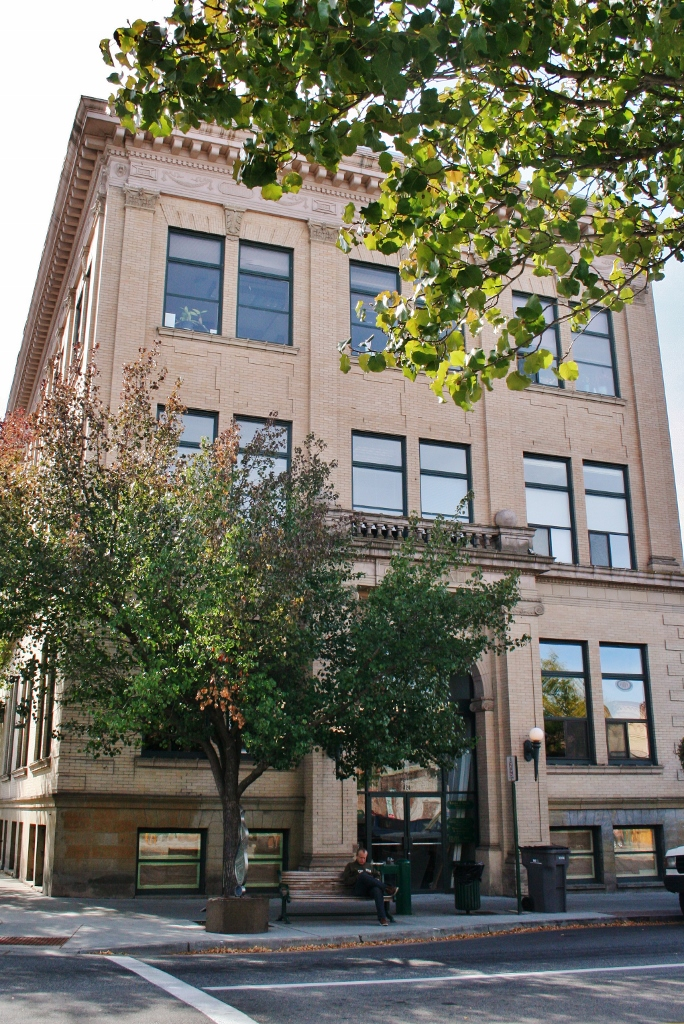
- The building in 2014

- Location within Idaho Location within the United States
- Location: 5th and Sherman Streets, Coeur d'Alene, Idaho
- Coordinates: 47°40′24″N 116°46′43″W
- Area: less than one acre
- Built: 1908
- Architect: George Williams
- Architectural style: Renaissance Revival
- NRHP reference No.: 79000792
- Added to NRHP: August 3, 1979

The Coeur d'Alene City Hall is a historic building in Coeur d'Alene, Idaho. It was built in 1908, and designed in the Renaissance Revival style by architect George Williams. It served as the de facto courthouse until the construction of the Kootenai County Courthouse in 1926, and it later housed the offices of city officials, police officers and firefighters. It has been listed on the National Register of Historic Places since August 3, 1979.
