= Harvey M. Davey House =

- U.S. National Register of Historic Places
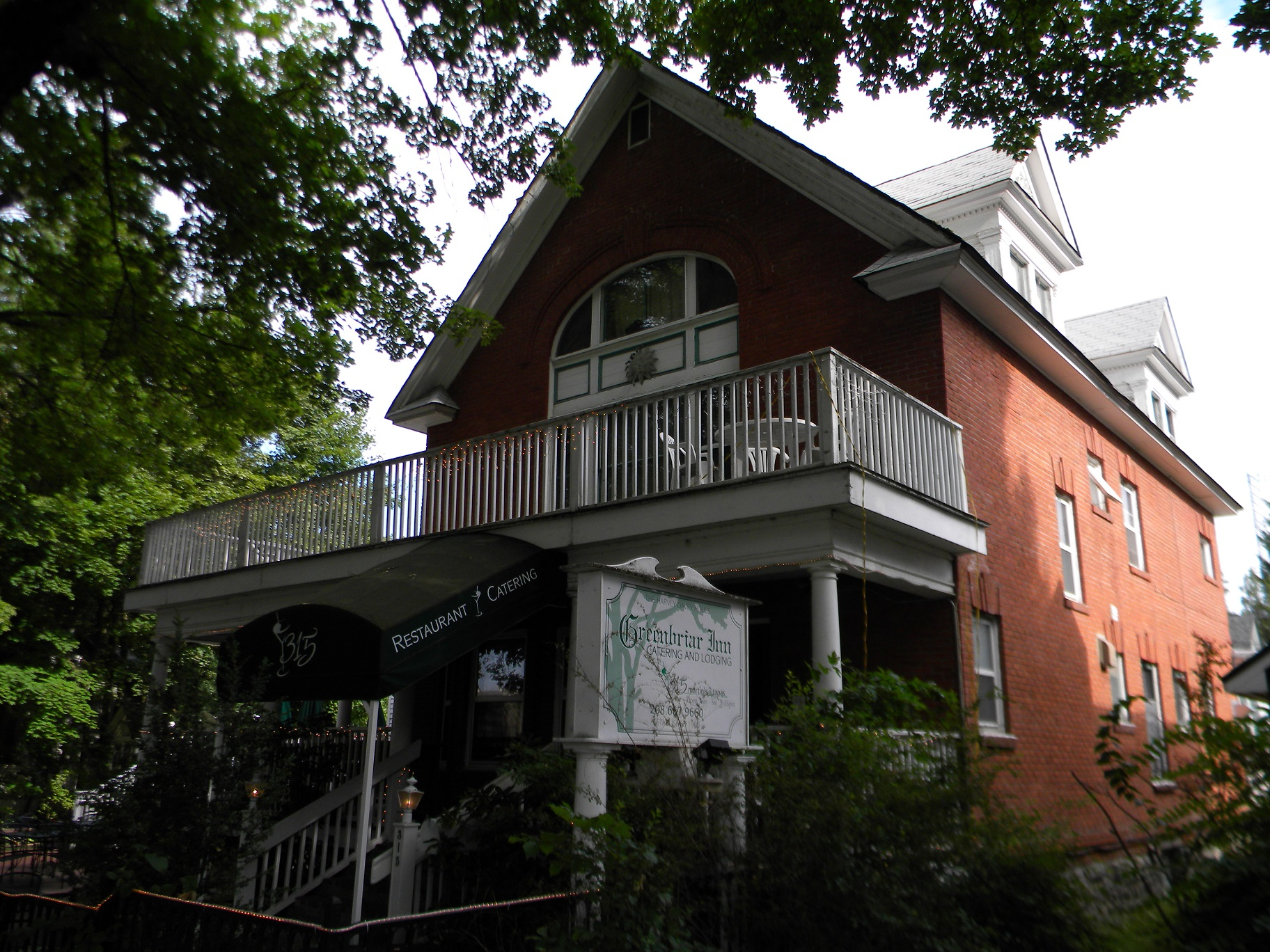
- The house in 2015

- Location within Idaho Location within the United States
- Location: 315 Wallace Avenue, Coeur d'Alene, Idaho
- Coordinates: 47°40′37″N 116°46′51″W
- Area: less than one acre
- Built: 1908
- Built by: Harvey M. Davey
- NRHP reference No.: 85001126
- Added to NRHP: May 23, 1985

The Harvey M. Davey House is a historic house in Coeur d'Alene, Idaho. It was built in 1908 for Harvey M. Davey, a general contractor who oversaw the construction of many buildings in the area. According to historian Nancy F. Renk, "The Davey house remains significant today because it has been changed so little over the years." It has been listed on the National Register of Historic Places since May 23, 1985.
