= Coeur du Christ Academy =

Location
- 623 E Wallace Ave; Ceour d'Alene, Idaho; United States
- 47.676881°N 116.776972°W

Information
- Type: Private
- Motto: Christus in Corde Omnium (Christ at the Heart of Everything)
- Established: 2022; 4 years ago
- Principal: Genavive Edman
- Staff: 9
- Grades: 9–12
- Enrollment: 81 (2026)
- Student to teacher ratio: 11:1
- Colors: Navy; Crimson; White
- Athletics conference: 1A North Star League
- Mascot: Saints
- Accreditation: Recommended by the Cardinal Newman Society, Member of the Institute for Catholic Liberal Education, Cognia (in process) & National Association of Private Catholic and Independent Schools (NAPCIS) candidate
- Website: coeurduchrist.org

Coeur du Christ Academy is a four-year private high school located in Coeur d'Alene, Idaho.

== History ==
Founded as a private school in the Catholic tradition, the doors opened September 7, 2022 for the inaugural day of school. It was located in the historic First United Methodist Church, which was built in 1906. In 2025 they purchased and moved to a larger facility across the street where enrollment could be increased to 150 in the future.

== Athletics ==
Coeur du Christ Saints compete in the 1A division, the smallest division in the Idaho High School Activities Association (IHSAA). They participate in the District I North Star League.

== Notable people ==
- Kellen Clemens - Serves as Board Chair, Athletic Director, and football coach. Former NFL quarterback.
- Genavive Edman - Serves as President of the School, Founder, and CEO. Former D1 collegiate golfer at Gonzaga University.
