= John P. and Stella Gray House =

- U.S. National Register of Historic Places
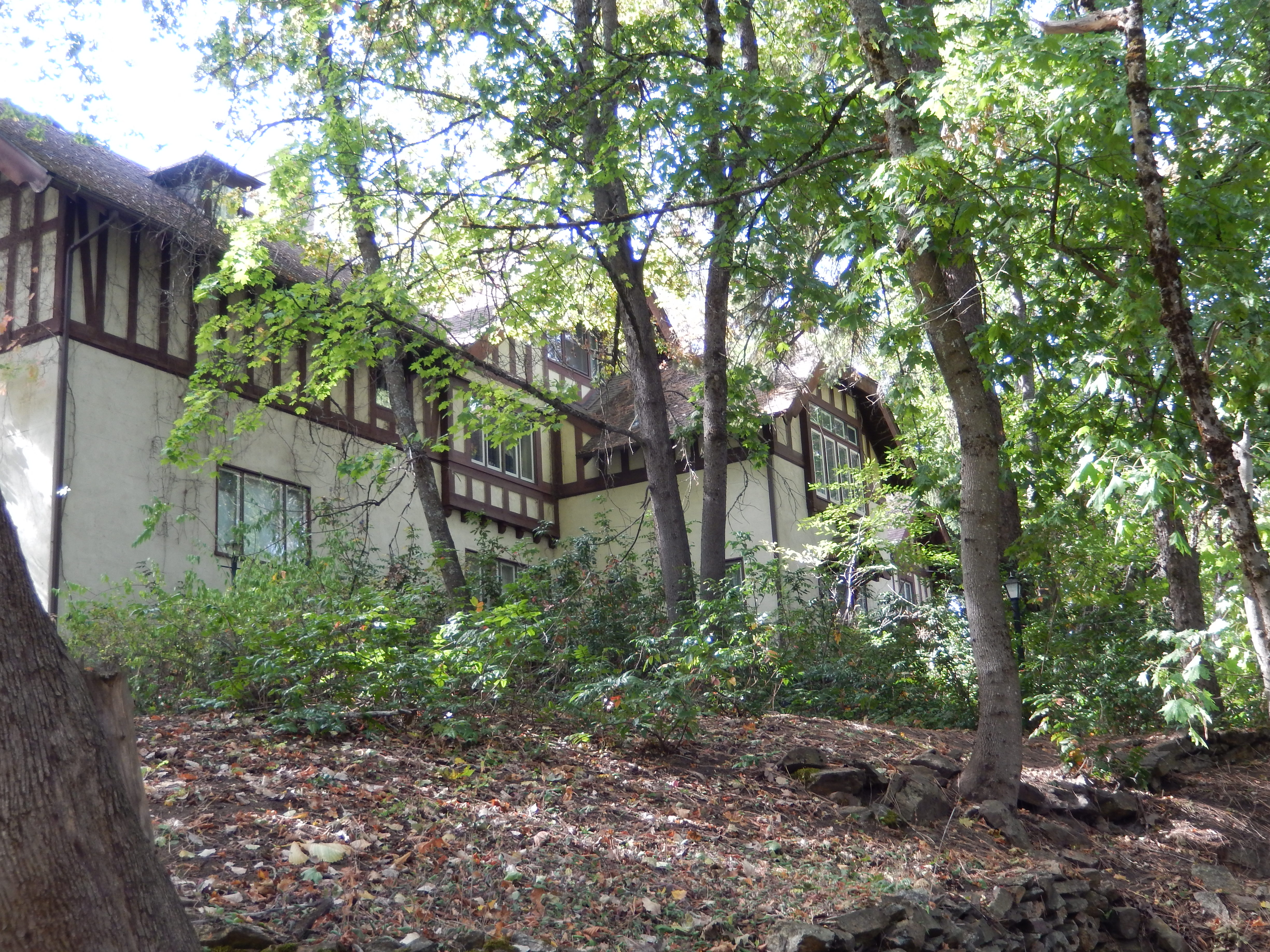
- The house in 2014

- Location within Idaho Location within the United States
- Location: 521 South Thirteenth Street, Coeur d'Alene, Idaho
- Coordinates: 47°40′09″N 116°46′01″W
- Area: 1.6 acres (0.65 ha)
- Built: 1913
- Architect: Kirtland Cutter
- Architectural style: Tudor Revival
- NRHP reference No.: 88000272
- Added to NRHP: March 31, 1988

The John P. and Stella Gray House is a historic house in Coeur d'Alene, Idaho. It was built in 1910 for Boyd Hamilton, second mayor of Coeur d'Alene, Idaho and well known local banker. Hamilton's wife was Alta Mae Browne, daughter of J.J. Browne. The original architects were Cowley & Rigg of Spokane. In 1911 Hamilton sold the house to John P. Gray, a lawyer. Gray hired the firm of Kirtland Cutter to carry out alterations to the house. Gray lived here with his wife Stella until his death in 1939. It was purchased by the Mauser family in 1953, who sold it to the Hamans within a year. As a side note, Lawrence "Larry" & Mable Haman had a son named Gary who would become first a lawyer and then a judge. He later purchased the Boyd Hamilton House on Government Way and used it for a law office. The house was designed in the Tudor Revival style by architect Kirtland Cutter. It has been listed on the National Register of Historic Places since March 31, 1988.
