= Medimont, Idaho =

Unincorporated community in the state of Idaho, United States

- Unincorporated community
- Location within Idaho Location within the United States
- Coordinates: 47°28′34″N 116°36′16″W
- Country: United States
- State: Idaho
- County: Kootenai
- Elevation: 2,182 ft (665 m)
- Time zone: UTC-8 (Pacific (PST))
  - Summer (DST): UTC-7 (PDT)
- ZIP code: 83842
- Area codes: 208, 986
- GNIS feature ID: 396877

Medimont is an unincorporated community in Kootenai County, Idaho, United States. Medimont is located on the north shore of Cave Lake, 8.5 miles (13.7 km) east-northeast of Harrison. Medimont has a post office with ZIP code 83842.

The Trail of the Coeur d'Alenes bicycle trail passes through Medimont.

== History ==
Medimont's population was 162 in 1909, and was 50 in 1960.

== Historic places ==
From the National Register of Historic Places listings in Kootenai County, Idaho

- Cave Lake School
- Indian Springs School II
