= St. Stanislaus Kostka Mission =

Historic church in Idaho, United States

- U.S. National Register of Historic Places
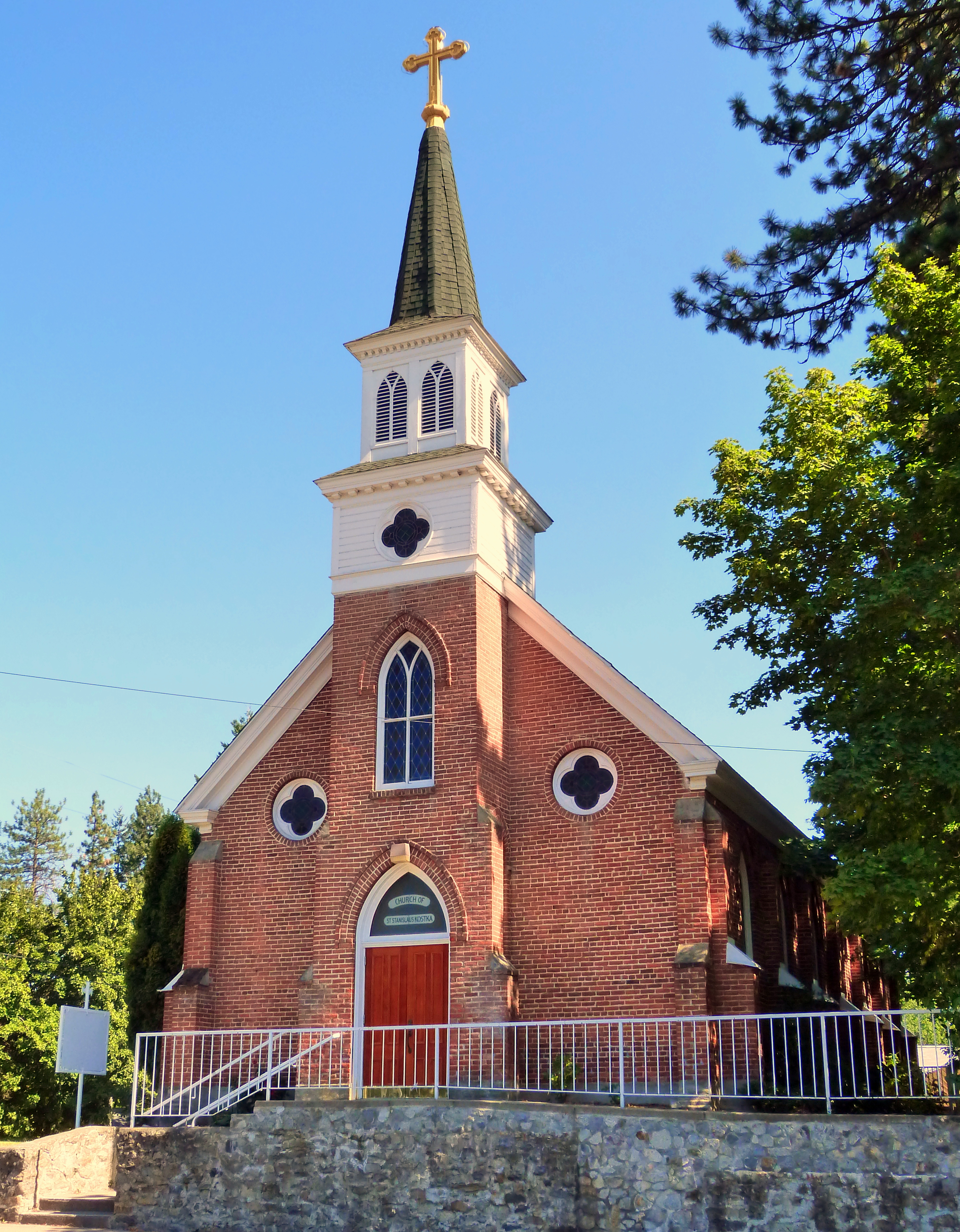
- The church in 2015

- Location within Idaho Location within the United States
- Location: McCartney and 3rd Streets, Rathdrum, Idaho
- Coordinates: 47°48′38″N 116°53′43″W
- Area: less than one acre
- Built: 1900
- Architectural style: Gothic Revival
- NRHP reference No.: 77000464
- Added to NRHP: November 17, 1977

The St. Stanislaus Kostka Mission is a historic Roman Catholic church in Rathdrum, Idaho. It serves as a mission and chapel of ease of the Parish of St. George in Post Falls, both within the Roman Catholic Diocese of Boise.

The church was established by Fr. T.J. Purcell, who as a young coal miner in Pennsylvania had aspired to the priesthood, but been unable to pursue it due to epilepsy. He prayed to St. Stanislaus Kostka of Poland, who also faced obstacles in his path to a religious vocation, promising to build and dedicate a church to the saint if he were cured. He relocated to Spokane, where he met a bishop who invited him to study for the priesthood in Montreal. Purcell built the Rathdrum church to fulfill his vow. A mural of St. Stanislaus kneeling before the Virgin Mary and infant Jesus was donated by Gonzaga University and restored in 2014.

Designed in the Gothic Revival architectural style, the church was built in 1900 and dedicated in 1901. It is the oldest Roman Catholic church built with bricks in the state of Idaho. It has been listed on the National Register of Historic Places since November 17, 1977.
