= Bayview School II =

- U.S. National Register of Historic Places
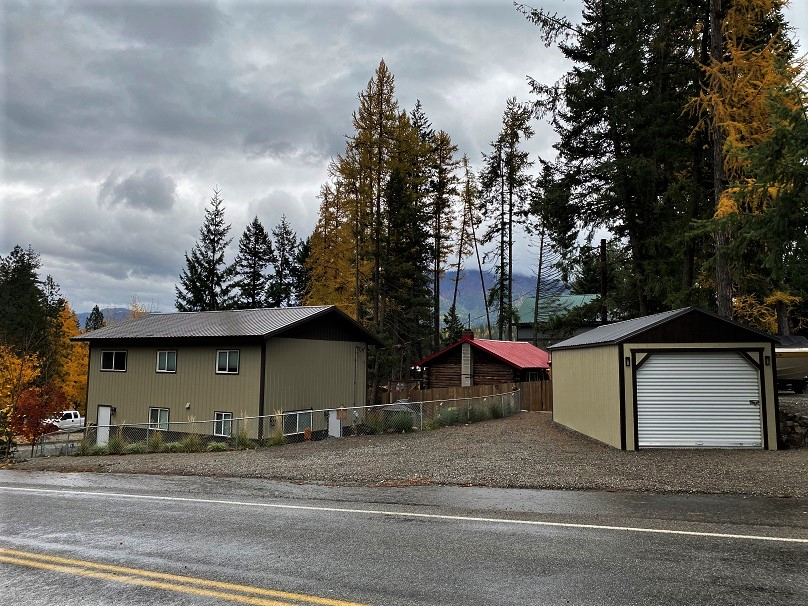
- Bayview School II This is the tagged location of the former Bayview School, located in the 30000 block of Perimeter Road, f/k/a: Careywood Road.

- Location within Idaho Location within the United States
- Location: Careywood Rd., Bayview, Idaho
- Coordinates: 47°59′2″N 116°33′46″W
- Area: 0.1 acres (0.040 ha)
- Built: 1911
- Architectural style: Colonial Revival
- MPS: Kootenai County Rural Schools TR
- NRHP reference No.: 85002090
- Added to NRHP: September 12, 1985

The Bayview School II in Bayview in Kootenai County, Idaho was a historic school built in 1911. It was listed on the National Register of Historic Places in 1985.

It replaced a 1900-built one-room log schoolhouse which had been Bayview's first schoolhouse. It is a "large and expressively designed schoolhouse", about 45 by 45 feet (14 m × 14 m) in plan, with an 18 by 36 feet (5.5 m × 11.0 m) gable-roofed wing. It has elements of Colonial Revival architecture including a truncated hipped roof on the main section.

Its location was on the south side of Careywood Road, about 1/2 mile west of Scenic Bay.

The school may no longer exist.
