= First United Methodist Church (Coeur d'Alene, Idaho) =

Historic church in Idaho, United States

- U.S. National Register of Historic Places
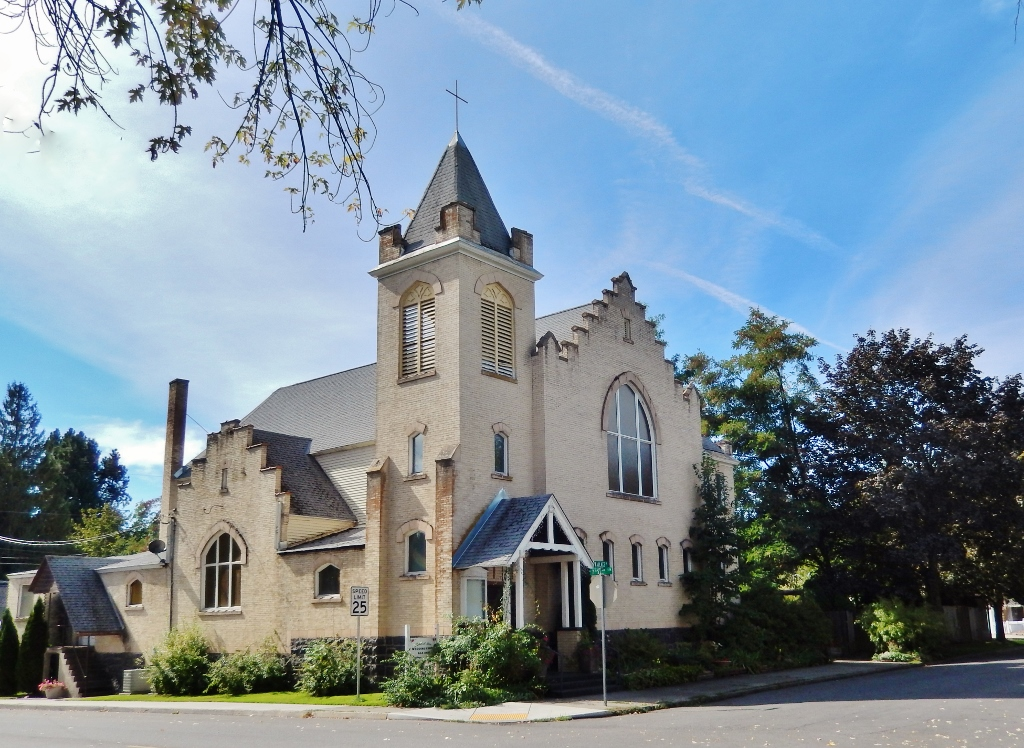

- Location within Idaho Location within the United States
- Location: 618 Wallace Ave., Coeur d'Alene, Idaho
- Coordinates: 47°40′35″N 116°46′37″W
- Area: less than one acre
- Built: 1906
- Architect: George Williams
- NRHP reference No.: 79000793
- Added to NRHP: June 18, 1979

First United Methodist Church is a historic Methodist church at 618 Wallace Avenue in Coeur d'Alene, Idaho. It was built in 1906 and was added to the National Register in 1979.

The church was designed by Coeur d'Alene architect George Williams, and it was built mostly by volunteer labor. It has stepped gables on its two street-facing facades, which are made of white pressed brick. The building has two towers of different heights.

Between 2022 and 2025, it housed the Coeur du Christ Academy.
