= Coeur d'Alene Masonic Temple =

- U.S. National Register of Historic Places
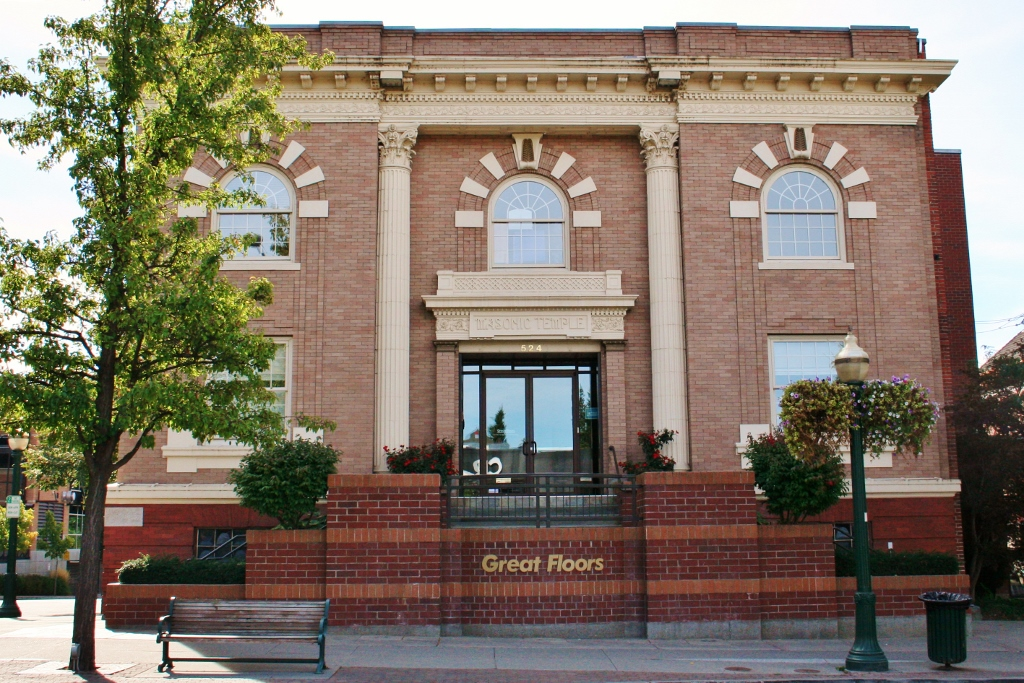

- Location within Idaho Location within the United States
- Location: 525 Sherman Ave., Coeur d'Alene, Idaho
- Coordinates: 47°40′23″N 116°46′43″W
- Area: less than one acre
- Built: 1909-1911
- Architect: Williams, George
- Architectural style: Late 19th and 20th Century Revivals architecture, Second Renaissance Revival architecture
- NRHP reference No.: 78001071
- Added to NRHP: May 22, 1978

The Coeur d'Alene Masonic Temple in Coeur d'Alene, Idaho is a building constructed during 1909–1911. It was listed on the National Register of Historic Places in 1978.

The building includes terra cotta and iron ornamentation. It was designed by Coeur d'Alene architect George Williams, who was himself active in the Scottish Rite order of the Masons. It was deemed "architecturally significant as a good example of a Renaissance Revival building in Coeur d'Alene.
