= The Roosevelt Inn =

- Roosevelt School
- U.S. National Register of Historic Places
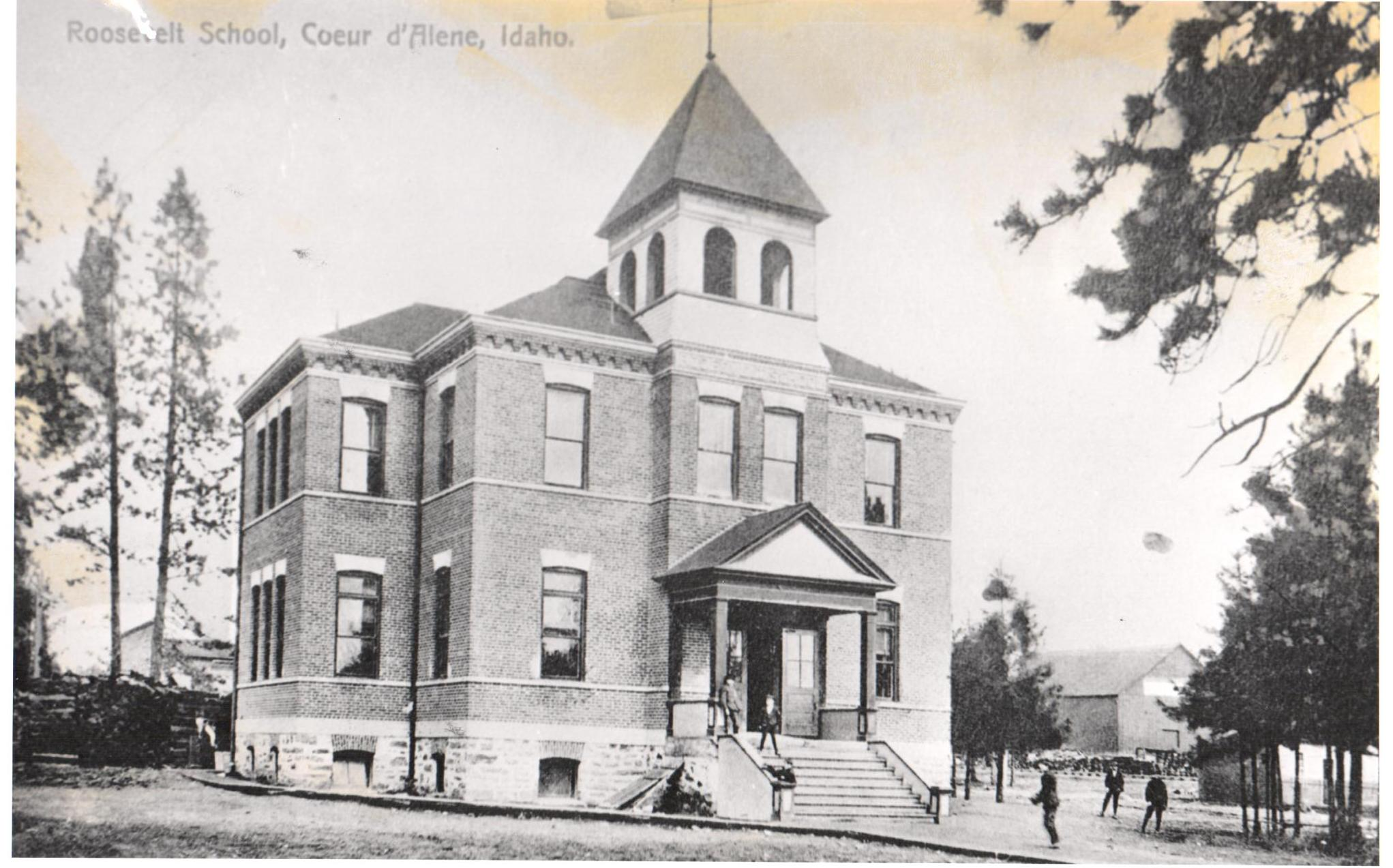
- The Roosevelt School circa 1910

- Location within Idaho Location within the United States
- Location: 1st and Wallace Streets, Coeur d'Alene, Idaho
- Coordinates: 47°40′37.75″N 116°47′6″W
- Area: less than one acre
- Built: 1905
- Architect: George Williams
- Architectural style: Queen Anne, Romanesque
- NRHP reference No.: 76000676
- Added to NRHP: July 30, 1976

The Roosevelt Inn is located near downtown Coeur d'Alene in North Idaho. Originally built in 1905 as the Roosevelt School, it is recognized as a historic building listed on the National Register of Historic Places. It was converted into an inn in 1994.

== Origins as a school ==
The building was constructed in 1905 as an elementary school for the first through sixth grades. The school was built primarily to serve the needs of families in the city center. Initially two grades shared each classroom, and on occasion the school would handle overflow from the high school. Due to growth in Coeur d'Alene, in 1945 the school stopped serving the fifth and sixth grades. The building continued to operate as a school through 1971 at which time a larger and more modern school was erected. The original bell tower was destroyed during a windstorm in 1958; it would not be fully restored until 1994.

After the building was no longer in use as an elementary school, the Board of Education used the facility as a storage and book depository until 1979. In 1979 the Board of Education sold the building to Jonas Marias who turned the Roosevelt School into an office building. During this renovation a third story was added to the building. This renovation reduced the original ceiling heights from 18 feet to 10 feet. The effects of this addition are seen in the bricks on the front facade which had to be installed to align the new windows.

== Modern usage ==
The school was operated as an office building from 1982 until 1992 when it was converted to a bed and breakfast and reopened in 1994. Tina and John Hough purchased the property in 1999 and remained the innkeepers until 2025. John Hough attended the Roosevelt School as a student from first to fourth grade. Operating as a bed and breakfast, The Roosevelt Inn has fifteen rooms and wheelchair access.

A renovation of the bell tower took place in 2000, turning it into a two-story suite which looks out on Lake Coeur d'Alene. In 2008 the basement of the school was renovated into a banquet hall and meeting facility capable of seating up to 50 people.

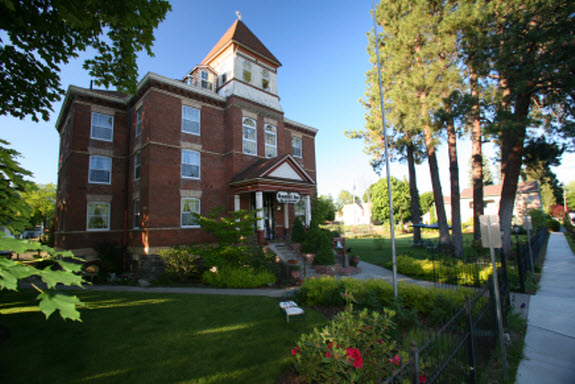
The Roosevelt Inn Bed and Breakfast

In 2012, the Roosevelt Inn was featured in the season 1 finale of the Fox television show Hotel Hell with Gordon Ramsay. The show renovations included the honeymoon suite, the reception area, and much of the decor.
