= Samuel and Ann Young House =

Historic house in Idaho, United States

- U.S. National Register of Historic Places
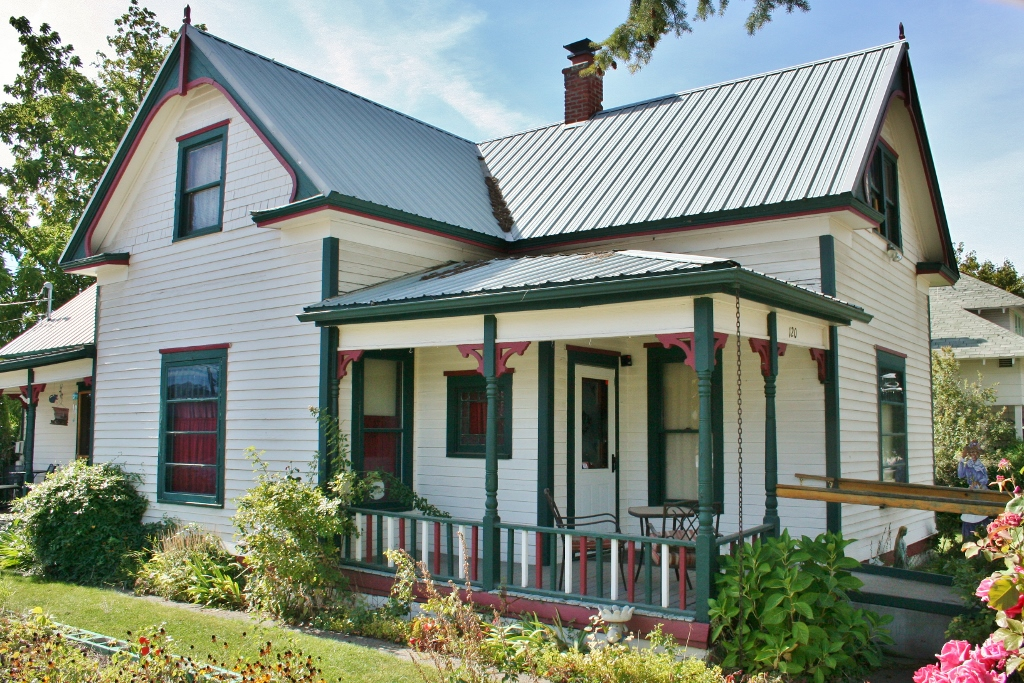

- Location within Idaho Location within the United States
- Location: 120 4th Ave., Post Falls, Idaho
- Coordinates: 47°42′39″N 116°56′44″W
- Area: less than one acre
- Built: c.1900
- Architectural style: Queen Anne
- NRHP reference No.: 97000765
- Added to NRHP: July 9, 1997

The Samuel and Ann Young House in Post Falls, Idaho was built c.1900 and was listed on the National Register of Historic Places in 1997.

It is a one-and-a-half-story "modest vernacular version of the Queen Anne style." It was deemed significant as "a rare survivor of the first significant developmental period in the history of Post Falls."
