= Cave Lake School =

- U.S. National Register of Historic Places
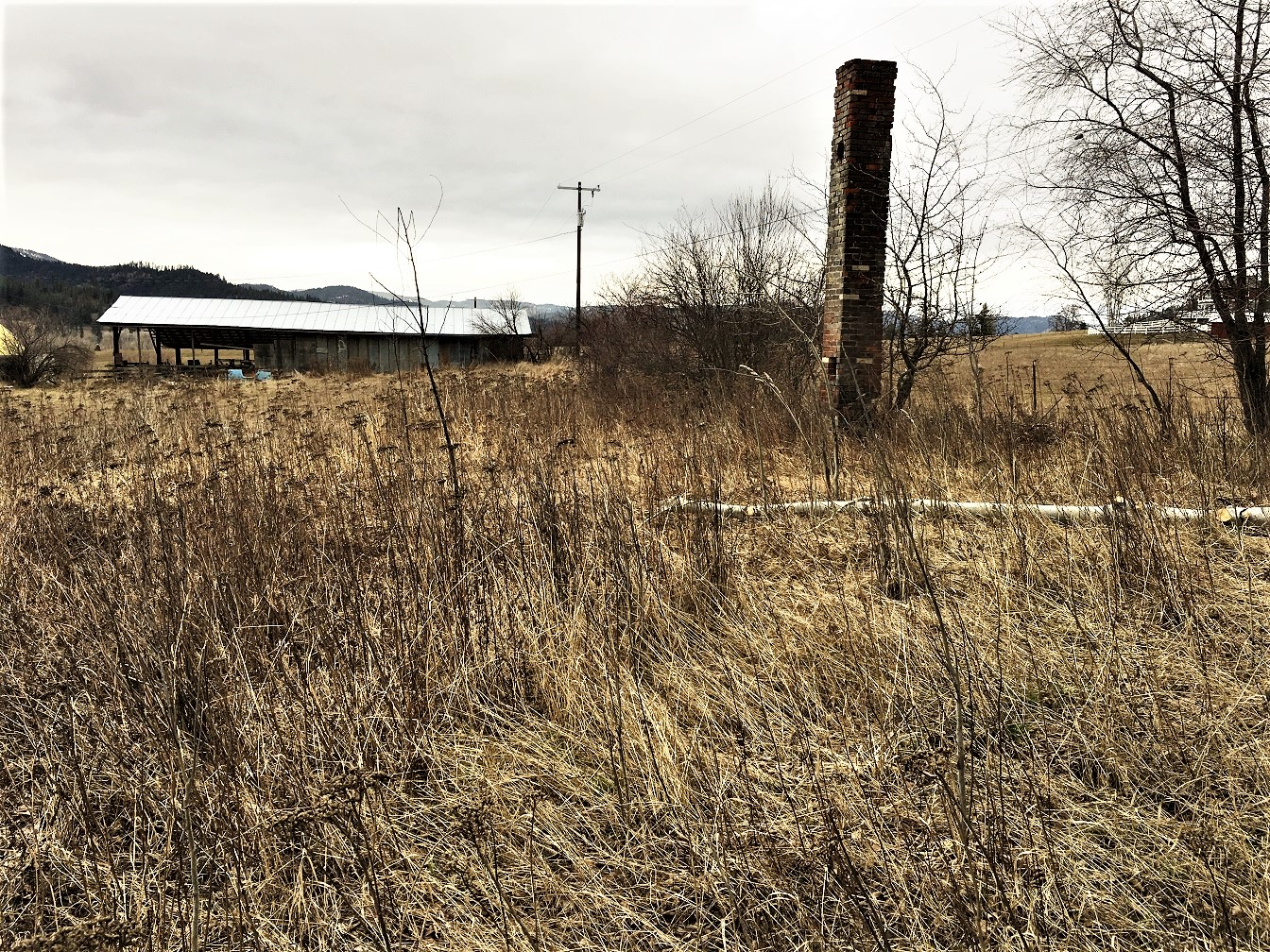
- Cave Lake School Chimney is sole remainder of the School, which was destroyed by fire in 1980. Information provided by Gay Wright, a descendant of the pioneer Whelan Family.

- Location within Idaho Location within the United States
- Nearest city: Medimont, Idaho
- Coordinates: 47°25′20″N 116°36′32″W
- Area: 1 acre (0.40 ha)
- Built: 1913
- Architectural style: Colonial Revival, Bungalow/craftsman
- MPS: Kootenai County Rural Schools TR
- NRHP reference No.: 85002092
- Added to NRHP: September 12, 1985

The Cave Lake School, in Kootenai County, Idaho near Medimont, Idaho, was built in 1913. It was listed on the National Register of Historic Places in 1985.

It is a 30 by 50 feet (9.1 m × 15.2 m) wood-frame building "influenced by the Colonial Revival and bungalow styles", with a hipped roof and painted shiplap siding. It is an important example of "exploration/settlement architecture."

It was used as a school from 1913 until the 1950s. At the time of National Register listing, it was privately owned and was used for hay storage.

It is located on the north side of Idaho State Highway 3, near its intersection with Willow Creek Road, about halfway between the southern ends of Cave Lake and Medicine Lake.

The building may have been destroyed or moved.
