= Post Falls Community United Presbyterian Church =

Historic church in Idaho, United States

- U.S. National Register of Historic Places
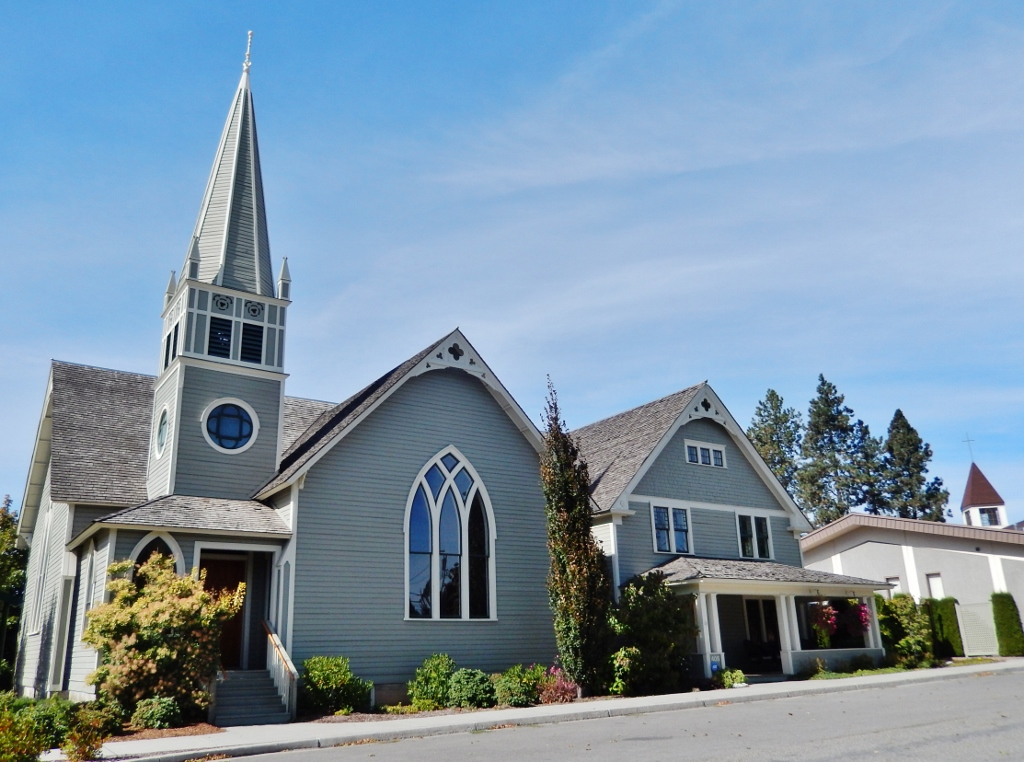

- Location within Idaho Location within the United States
- Location: Post Falls, Idaho
- Coordinates: 47°42′41″N 116°56′43″W
- Area: 0.2 acres (0.081 ha)
- Built: 1890, 1921
- Architectural style: Gothic Revival Vernacular
- NRHP reference No.: 84003851
- Added to NRHP: September 7, 1984

The Post Falls Community United Presbyterian Church is a historic Presbyterian church in Post Falls, Idaho. It was added to the National Register of Historic Places in 1984.

It was assembled in 1921 from the combination of two former churches that would move to the site from other Post Falls locations. The former Post Falls Methodist Episcopal Church building has served as the sanctuary and the former Post Falls First Presbyterian Church building has served as a Christian education wing.
