= Disappearance of F. Lewis Clark =

American industrialist (1861–1914)

F. Lewis Clark
- Born: Francis Lewis Clark; June 21, 1861; Bangor, Maine
- Disappeared: January 16, 1914 (aged 52)
- Status: Missing for 112 years, 1 month and 10 days
- Died: Unknown
- Occupation: Industrialist
- Spouse: Winifred Clark

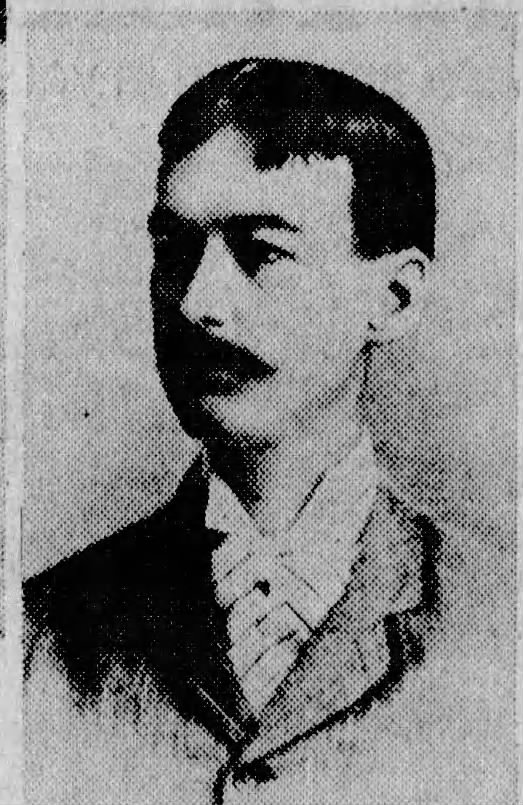
A photo of F. Lewis Clark featured in a 1974 edition of The Spokesman Review.

Francis Lewis Clark (June 21, 1861 – 1914?) was a prominent American industrialist. He disappeared after dropping off his wife at the train station in Santa Barbara, California.

== Career ==
In 1885, F. Lewis Clark established the C. & C. Mill and Elevator, the largest flouring mill in the Pacific Northwest. Mr. Clark was a founder of the America's Cup race, and sold the land and carried the contract for Louis Davenport to build his famed Davenport Hotel.

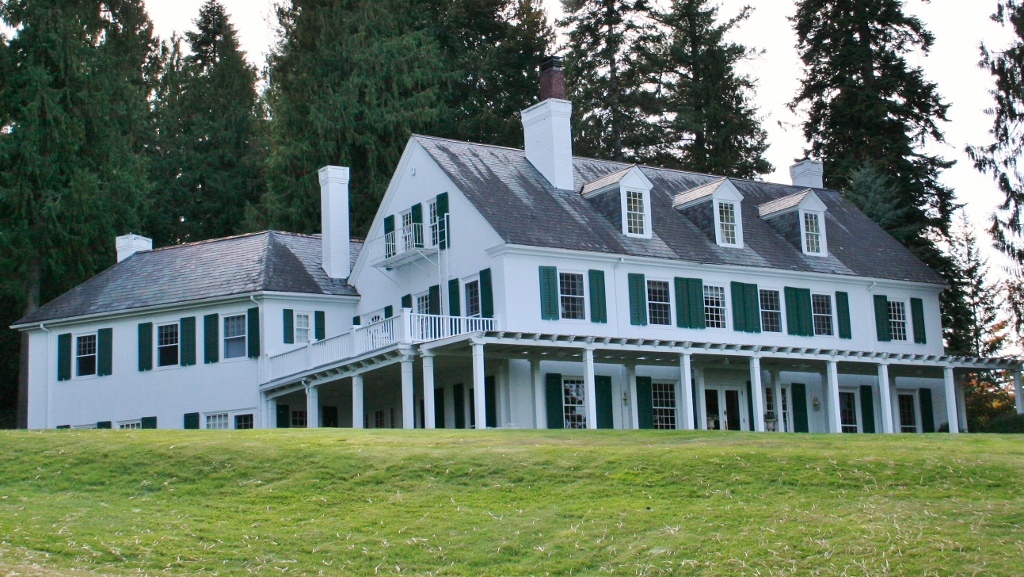
The Clark House in Hayden Lake

In 1898, F. Lewis Clark and his wife, Winifred Clark, hired the noted architect Kirtland Cutter to design a mansion on 7th Avenue in Spokane, Washington. This 14,400-square-foot (1,340 m^{2}) mansion is currently used for offices, and retains its natural woodwork and original features. In 1910, Clark constructed a second mansion on Hayden Lake, Idaho, as a summer home. The "Honeysuckle Lodge" was the most expensive home in Idaho at the time. This home currently is a country inn known as The Clark House. The house was designed by George Canning Wales of Boston.

On May 10, 1904, Clark was a defendant in the case of "Chemung Mining Co vs Hanley."

In 1906, Clark was vice-president of Spokane's Inland Railway Island Co.

== Disappearance ==
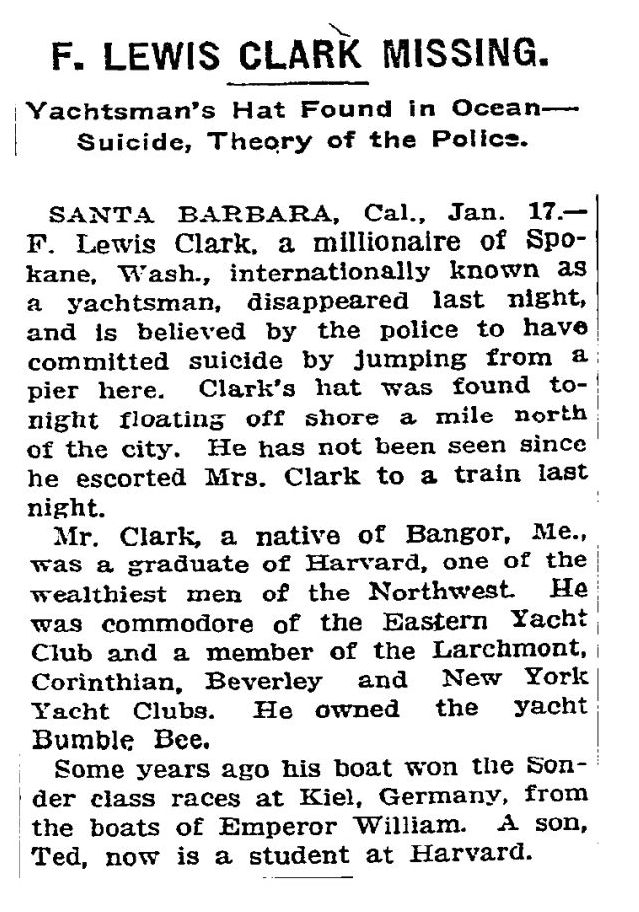
Article in the New York Times, 18 January 1914, regarding the disappearance

On January 16, 1914, F. Lewis Clark, his chauffeur and valet drove Mrs. Winifred Clark to the train station. The train was scheduled to depart at 11:30 p.m. F. Lewis Clark kissed his wife goodbye, then returned to his limousine. Instead of entering the vehicle however, F. Lewis Clark dismissed his chauffeur and valet and walked into the night. F. Lewis Clark was never seen or heard from again. According to a New York Times article from two days later, he was 'believed by police to have committed suicide by jumping from a pier' in Santa Barbara, as his hat had been found in the water. However, his body was never found. Winifred tried to manage the estate, but by 1922 she was forced to sell all of her possessions.

== See also ==
- List of people who disappeared
