= Hayden Lake, Idaho =

- City
- Location of Hayden Lake in Kootenai County, Idaho.

- Location in the United States
- Coordinates: 47°46′03″N 116°45′08″W
- Country: United States
- State: Idaho
- County: Kootenai

Area
  - Total: 0.78 sq mi (2.03 km^{2})
  - Land: 0.61 sq mi (1.58 km^{2})
  - Water: 0.17 sq mi (0.45 km^{2})
- Elevation: 2,280 ft (690 m)

Population (2020)
  - Total: 649
  - Density: 1,019.5/sq mi (393.64/km^{2})
- Time zone: UTC-8 (Pacific (PST))
  - Summer (DST): UTC-7 (PDT)
- ZIP code: 83835
- Area code: 208
- FIPS code: 16-36460
- GNIS feature ID: 2410722
- Website: cityofhaydenlake.gov

Hayden Lake is a city in Kootenai County, Idaho, United States. Located in the northern portion of the state, it is considered a suburb of the city of Coeur d'Alene. Its population was 574 at the 2010 census. The city was named after the nearby Lake Hayden, which is now more commonly also known as Hayden Lake, after the city.

The city is located around the Hayden Lake Country Club and a small portion of the northern part of the lake. Most of the lake is surrounded by the larger city of Hayden. The shores of the lake are filled with summer cabins to large historical and modern mansions and the historic Hayden Lake Country Club lies at the center of the community.

== Geography ==
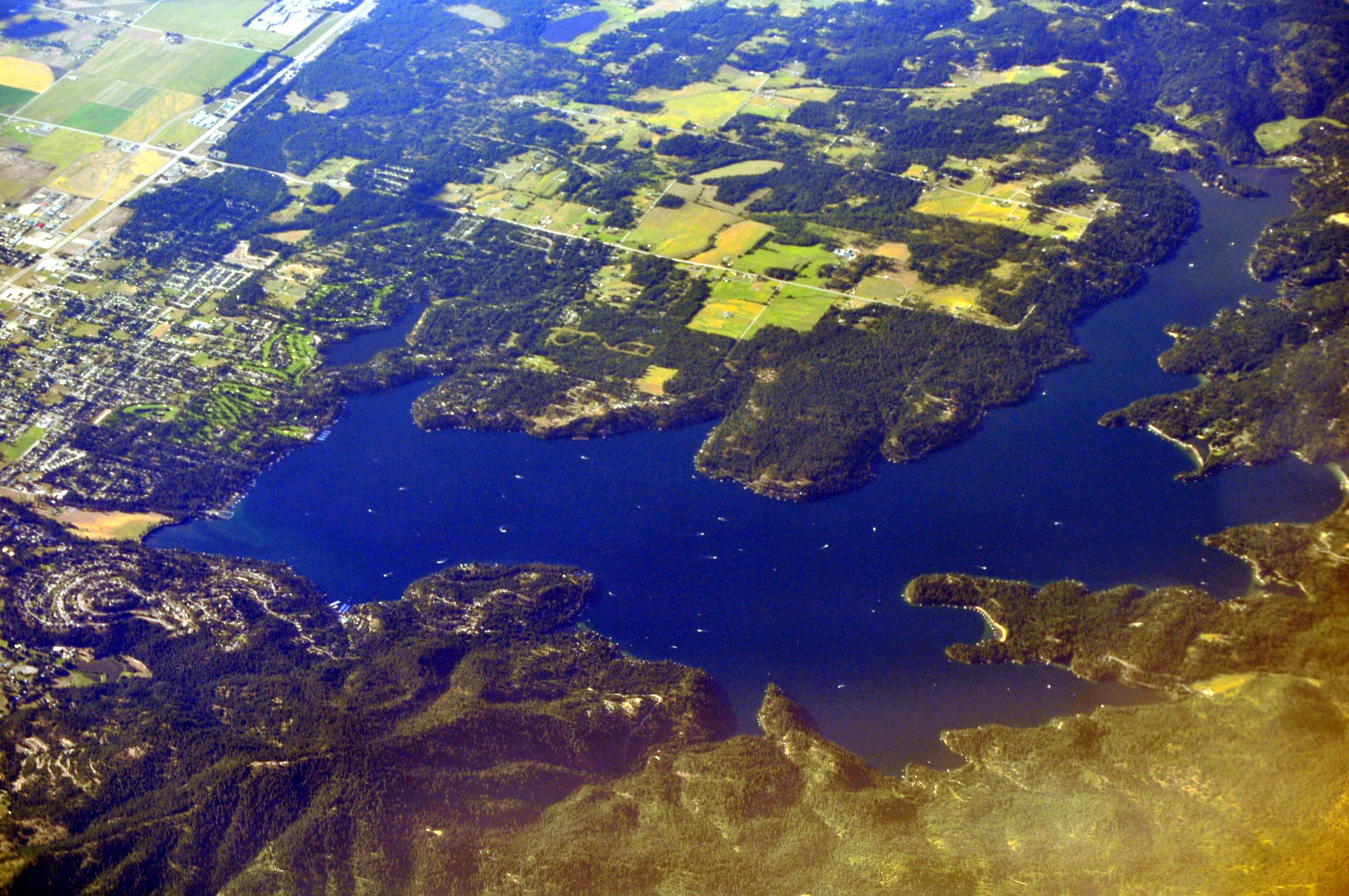
Aerial view of the lake from east by southeast, 2013

According to the United States Census Bureau, the city has a total area of 0.68 square miles (1.76 km^{2}), of which 0.59 square miles (1.53 km^{2}) is land and 0.09 square miles (0.23 km^{2}) is water.

=== Geology ===
Hayden Lake, like Lake Coeur d'Alene and other lakes surrounding the Spokane Valley and Rathdrum Prairie, was formed by the Missoula Floods, most recently 12,000 to 15,000 years ago. The Purcell Lobe of the Cordilleran Ice Sheet flowed south from Canada, carving the basin of present-day Lake Pend Oreille and damming the Clark Fork river. The impounded river repeatedly filled to form Glacial Lake Missoula and broke through the ice dam, resulting in massive floods that filled the Rathdrum Prairie area with sand, gravel, and boulders. Large eddy bars formed downstream from bedrock obstructions, thereby damming tributary valleys and creating lakes.

== History ==
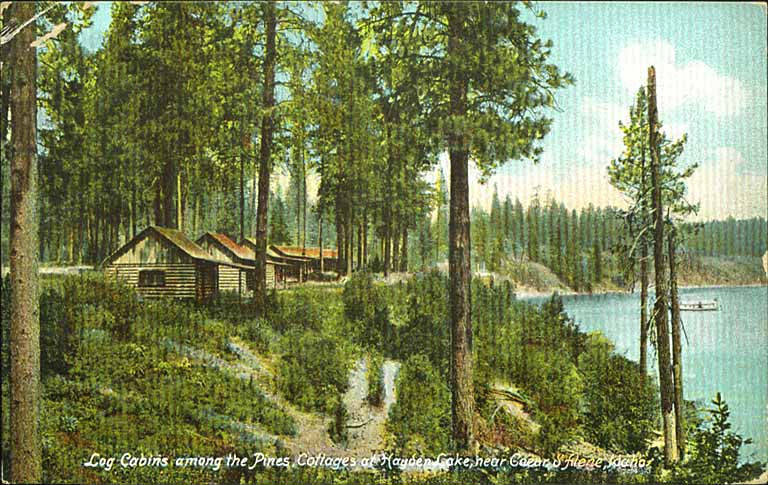
Log cabins at Hayden Lake, circa 1910

The Coeur D’Alene tribe territory centered around what is now Hayden Lake and nearby Lake Coeur d'Alene, gathering plants, including abundant huckleberries, fish and wildlife. The first white man to visit the area was Father DeSmet while serving as a missionary to the Coeur d’Alene Indians. While visiting, he named it Lake DeNuf and recorded several stories told by the local tribe about the lake and the surrounding area.

Hayden Lake's natural beauty attracted several wealthy people in the early 1900s. The F. Lewis Clark Mansion was built in 1910, and was the most expensive home in Idaho at the time. In 1914, Lewis mysteriously disappeared and was never seen or heard from again. In 1907, the Hayden Lake Country Club became a gathering place for many area socialites, such as Bing Crosby. A railway expansion made travel easy from nearby Spokane. HLCC opened the first 18-hole golf course in the state of Idaho in 1912.

From the 1970s until 2001, the neo-Nazi Aryan Nations had its headquarters in a 20-acre (8.1 ha) compound in Kootenai County near Hayden Lake. In September 2000, the Southern Poverty Law Center won a $6.3 million judgment against the Aryan Nations from an Idaho jury, who awarded punitive and compensatory damages to Victoria Keenan and her son, Jason, who were attacked by Aryan Nations guards in 1999. Bullets struck the Keenans' car several times, then the car crashed and an Aryan member held the Keenans at gunpoint. As a result of the judgment, Richard Butler turned the compound over to the Keenans, who then sold the property to a philanthropist who subsequently donated it to North Idaho College, which designated the land as a "peace park".

== Demographics ==
Historical population
| Census | Pop. | Note | %± |
|---|---|---|---|
| 1950 | 39 | | — |
| 1960 | 247 | | 533.3% |
| 1970 | 260 | | 5.3% |
| 1980 | 273 | | 5.0% |
| 1990 | 338 | | 23.8% |
| 2000 | 494 | | 46.2% |
| 2010 | 574 | | 16.2% |
| 2020 | 649 | | 13.1% |
| 2019 (est.) | 623 | | 8.5% |
U.S. Decennial Census

=== 2010 census ===
At the 2010 census there were 574 people in 256 households, including 188 families, in the city. The population density was 972.9 inhabitants per square mile (375.6/km^{2}). There were 369 housing units at an average density of 625.4 per square mile (241.5/km^{2}). The racial makeup of the city was 97.6% White, 0.2% Native American, 0.5% Asian, and 1.7% from two or more races. Hispanic or Latino of any race were 3.0%.

Of the 256 households 19.9% had children under the age of 18 living with them, 66.4% were married couples living together, 2.7% had a female householder with no husband present, 4.3% had a male householder with no wife present, and 26.6% were non-families. 22.7% of households were one person and 13.3% were one person aged 65 or older. The average household size was 2.24 and the average family size was 2.61.

The median age was 54.2 years. 17.8% of residents were under the age of 18; 3.7% were between the ages of 18 and 24; 14.5% were from 25 to 44; 34.9% were from 45 to 64; and 29.3% were 65 or older. The gender makeup of the city was 51.2% male and 48.8% female.

=== 2000 census ===
At the 2000 census there were 494 people in 208 households, including 164 families, in the city. The population density was 1,281.9 inhabitants per square mile (494.9/km^{2}). There were 307 housing units at an average density of 796.6 per square mile (307.6/km^{2}). The racial makeup of the city was 99.60% White, 0.20% Native American and 0.20% Asian. Hispanic or Latino of any race were 0.81%. 19.6% were of German, 14.4% English, 8.6% Irish, 6.1% Norwegian, 6.1% Scottish and 5.9% Swedish ancestry according to Census 2000. 97.6% spoke English and 2.4% Spanish as their first language.

Of the 208 households 23.6% had children under the age of 18 living with them, 74.0% were married couples living together, 4.3% had a female householder with no husband present, and 20.7% were non-families. 18.3% of households were one person and 9.1% were one person aged 65 or older. The average household size was 2.38 and the average family size was 2.65.

The age distribution was 19.2% under the age of 18, 3.4% from 18 to 24, 20.2% from 25 to 44, 35.4% from 45 to 64, and 21.7% 65 or older. The median age was 49 years. For every 100 females, there were 99.2 males. For every 100 females age 18 and over, there were 95.6 males.

The median household income was $65,893 and the median family income was $67,143. Males had a median income of $50,250 versus $30,804 for females. The per capita income for the city was $31,834. About 7.7% of families and 8.3% of the population were below the poverty line, including 11.7% of those under age 18 and 4.3% of those age 65 or over.

== Notable people ==
- Richard Butler, white supremacist founder of the neo-Nazi terrorist group Aryan Nations
- Brad Corrigan, guitarist and vocalist of the band Dispatch
- Don Larsen, major league pitcher best known for his perfect game pitched in the 1956 World Series
