= Flight 869 =

Flight 869 may refer to:

- United Arab Airlines Flight 869 (1962), crashed on 19 July 1962
- United Arab Airlines Flight 869 (1963), crashed on 28 July 1963
