= Ohio Match Company Railway =

American logging railroad

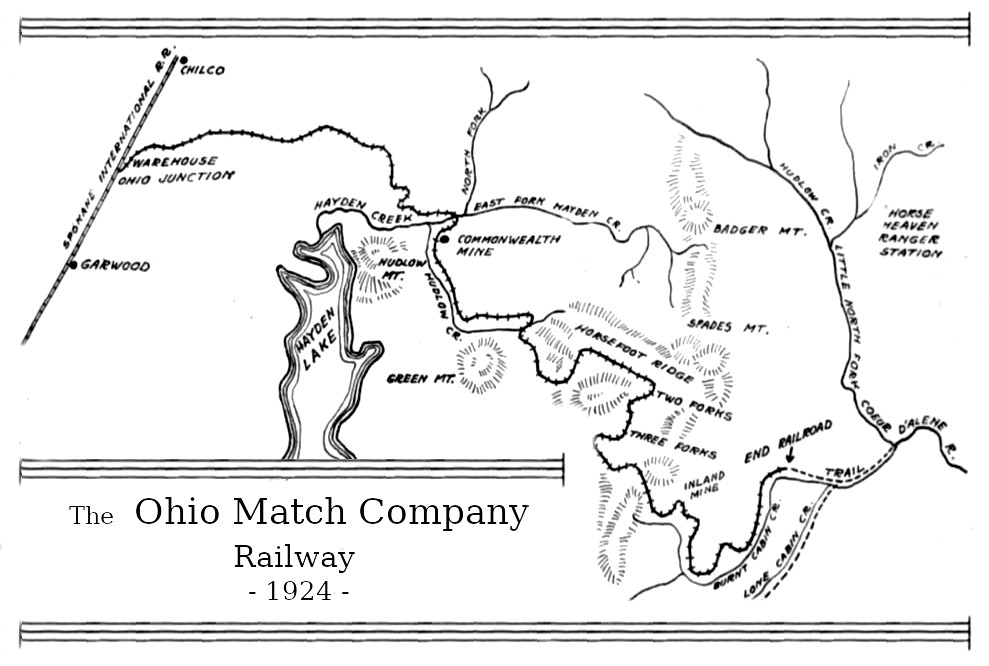
- Map of the Ohio Match Railway from 1924

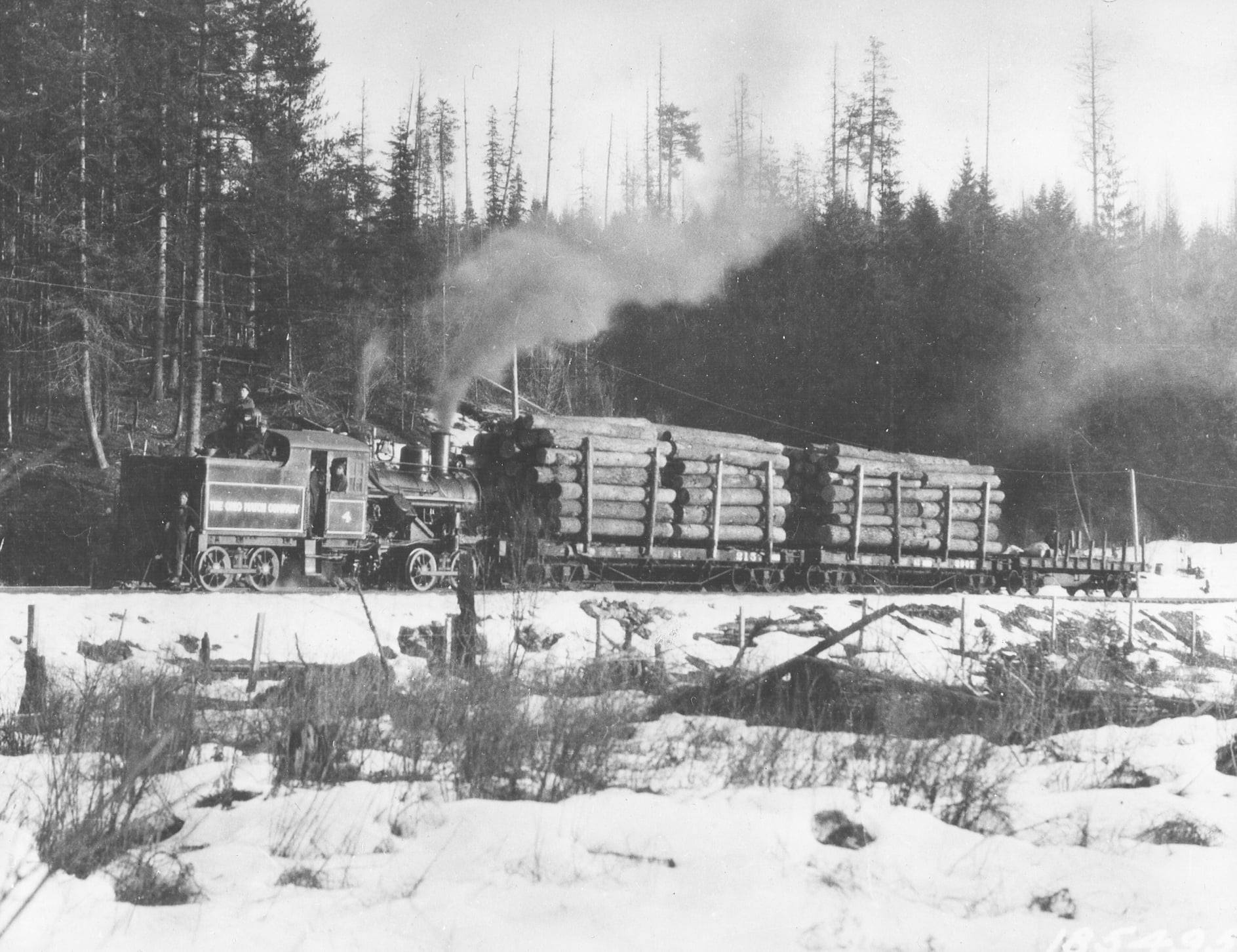
- Ohio Match Company Heisler #4

Overview
- Locale: Garwood, Idaho and Hayden Lake
- Dates of operation: 1924–1940

Technical
- Track gauge: 4 ft 8 1/2 in (1,435 mm) standard gauge
- Length: 25–48 miles (40–77 km)

The Ohio Match Company Railway was a logging railroad in northern Idaho that operated from Garwood, Idaho, around Hayden Lake and followed the Burnt Cabin Creek to the Little North Fork of the Coeur d'Alene River. The right of way roughly follows Ohio Match Road from Garwood, Idaho Burnt Cabin Road and then over the entirety of Burnt Cabin Road today. The Ohio Match railroad aided in harvesting white pine timber reserves that remained after the fire of 1910 for the production of matchsticks.

== History ==
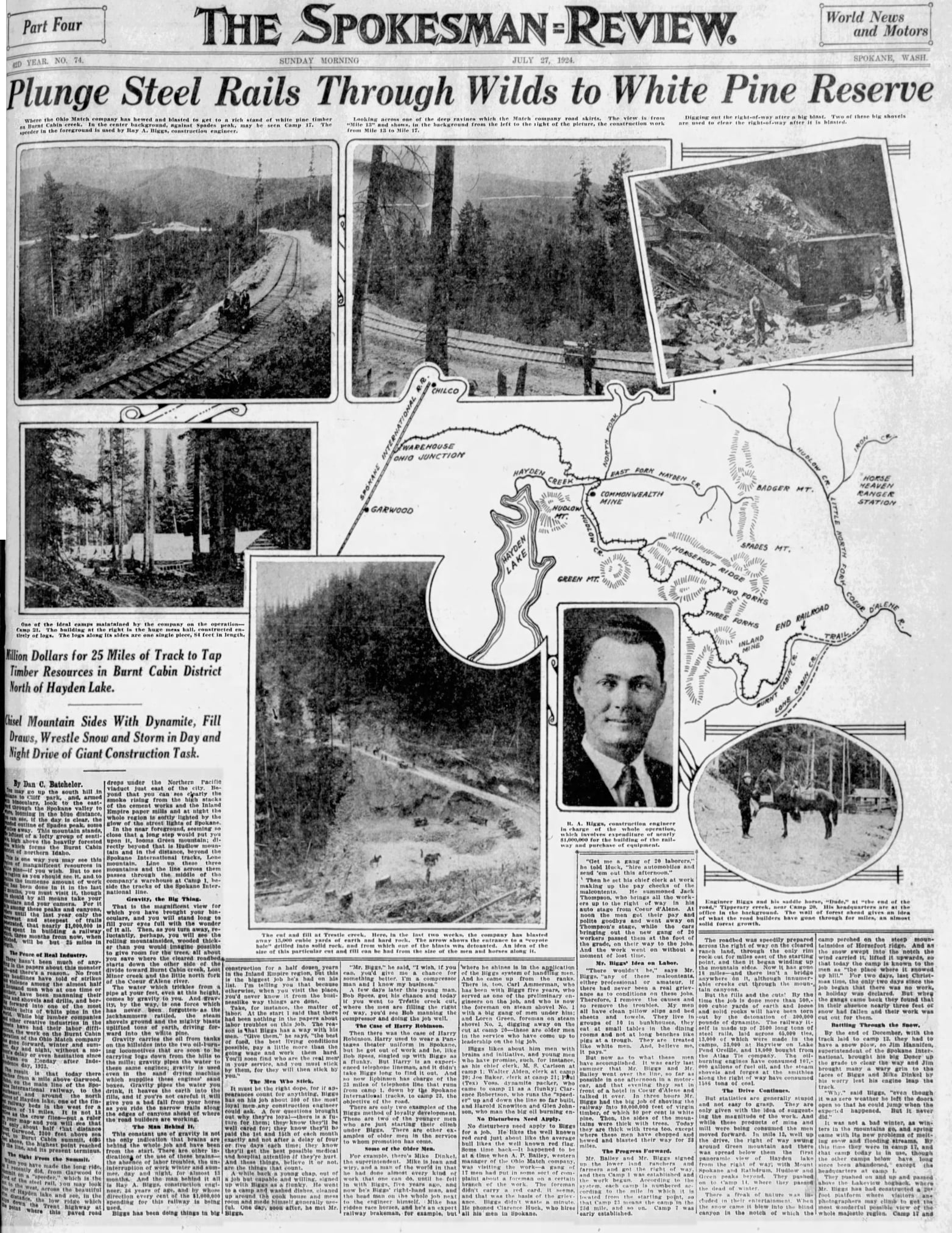
A 1924 Spokesman Review article on the construction of the Ohio Match Company railway. Note H. A. Biggs and his horse Dude.

Perl Bailey managed the Ohio Match Company’s western operation. H. A. Biggs was the engineer tasked with building the Ohio Match Railway. The Ohio Match railway was initially 25 miles (40 km) long, and stretched from the Spokane International in Garwood, Idaho around the north end of Hayden Lake over several grades to follow the Burnt Cabin Creek to the Little North Fork of the Coeur d'Alene River. The Ohio Match railroad connected 80,000 million acres of white pine timber reserves that remained after the fire of 1910 to the Atlas Tie Co. in Hayden, Idaho, to the Spokane International in Garwood, Idaho, and the Spokane, Coeur d'Alene and Palouse electric railroad in Hayden, Idaho, which brought lumber to Lake Coeur d'Alene to be floated to mills in and around Coeur d'Alene, Idaho. The Ohio Match Company served two mines, the Inland Mine (Burnt Cabin Prospect) and Commonwealth Mine, along its route. The Ohio Match Railway costed $1,000,000 in 1924 (Roughly $16,000,000 in 2022 or $650,000 per mile) to construct. The railway eventually extended beyond Horse Heaven covering a total of 48 miles (77 km). Two of Ohio Match Railway's locomotives, a climax and a shay, were sold to the U.S. Navy in 1940 to aid in the construction of Farragut Naval Base in Farragut, Idaho at the start of World War II.

== Preservation ==
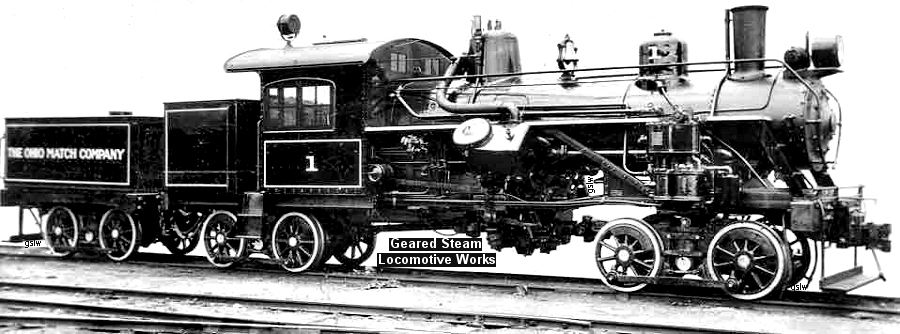
Ohio Match Company No. 1 Builders Photo - 1923

=== Preserved rolling stock ===
The Ohio Match Railroad's Shay and Climax were sold to the U.S. Navy in 1940 to construct Farragut Naval Base in Farragut, Idaho and scrapped by the U.S. Navy in 1944 for war materials. Two Ohio Match Railroad Heisler locomotives are preserved, but non-operational as of 2022.

- Ohio Match Company Three-Truck Heisler No. 1 was sold to Potlatch Lumber and renumbered 92 before being donated to the city of Lewiston, Idaho, in 1963 where it currently sits on display in the open as of 2022.
- Ohio Match Company Two-Truck Heisler No. 4 is displayed at the Northwest Railway Museum in Snoqualmie, Washington.

== See also ==
- Spokane International Railway
- Spokane and Inland Empire Railway
- Steamboats on Lake Coeur d'Alene
