= Spokane International =

Spokane International may refer to:

- Spokane International Airport
- Spokane International Railroad
