= Spokane International Railroad =

Defunct American short line railroad

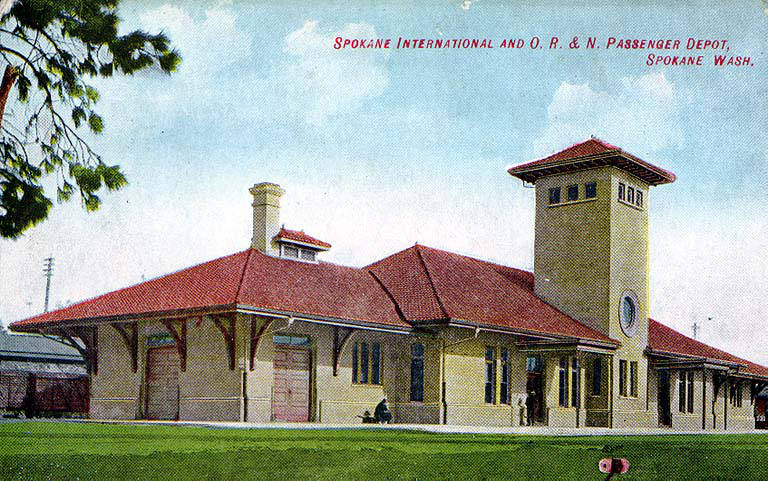
- Spokane International Railway, and Oregon Railroad and Navigation Co station, Spokane, Washington, 1910

Overview
- Headquarters: Spokane, Washington
- Reporting mark: SI, SIRY, SIRR
- Locale: Washington, Idaho, British Columbia
- Dates of operation: 1887–1958
- Successor: Union Pacific Railroad

Technical
- Track gauge: 4 ft 8 1/2 in (1,435 mm)
- Length: 190 miles (310 km)

The Spokane International Railroad (reporting mark SI) was a short line railroad between Spokane, Washington, and the Canadian Pacific Railway (CP) at Kingsgate, British Columbia. The line became an important one for the CP with its connections to the Union Pacific Railroad and Portland, Oregon.

The line, originally named the Spokane International Railway, was built by local businessman and railroader Daniel Chase Corbin following an agreement between him and the CP, with CP agreeing to fund much of the line's construction and to secure the loan by holding the new line's bonds.

Especially significant was that the CP controlled the Minneapolis, St. Paul and Sault Ste. Marie Railroad (Soo Line) and its connections to Minneapolis, Minnesota, Saint Paul, Minnesota, and Chicago, Illinois. Completion of the Spokane International now meant that the CP could compete with the Northern Pacific Railway and Great Northern Railway lines for transportation between the Midwest and the Puget Sound area (in conjunction with the Union Pacific Railroad subsidiary Oregon-Washington Railroad and Navigation Company west of Spokane). Express passenger service was soon introduced on the line via the Soo-Spokane Train De Luxe.

Two Ohio Match Company locomotives were sold to the U.S. Navy in 1940 to construct a spur off the Spokane International in order to construct the Farragut Naval Base in Farragut, Idaho, and were scrapped by the U.S. Navy in 1944 for war materials.

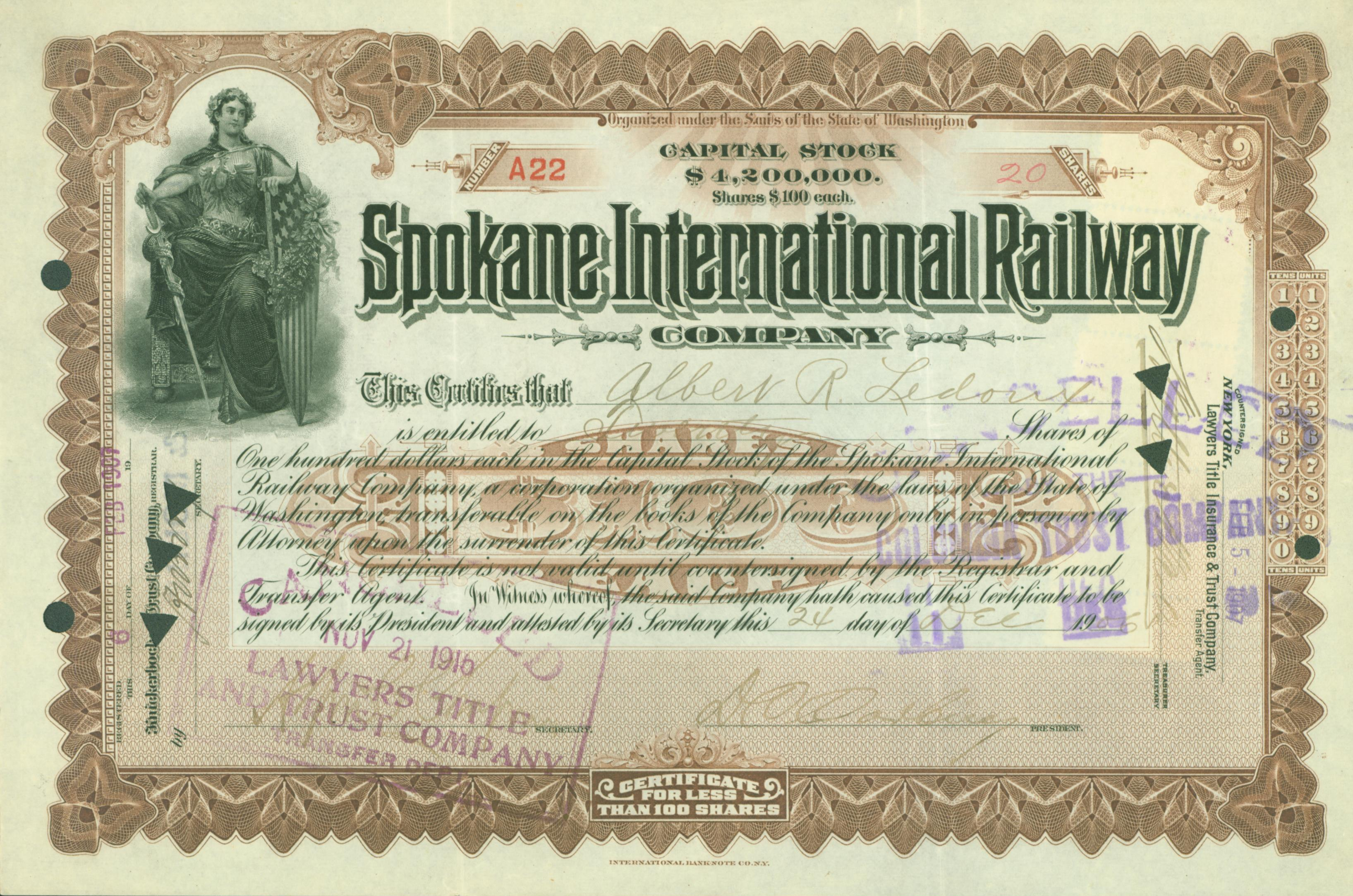
Share of the Spokane International Railway Company, issued 24 december 1906

The SI was reorganized October 1, 1941, following financial difficulties and receivership during the Great Depression. The line was renamed the Spokane International Railroad as part of the restructuring agreement until the 1950s.

On October 6, 1958, the Union Pacific Railroad (UP) took control of Spokane International Railroad. In 1962 UP leased SI's 11 ALCO RS-1 locomotives for operation. The locomotives were later repainted to UP's yellow and gray paint scheme, but retained their SI lettering. Also in 1962, UP sold four of its older steel cabooses to SI. These were also painted in UP's yellow scheme, but received SI lettering and numbers. After UP's 1958 control of SI, Union Pacific continued to lease SI for operation. On December 31, 1987, Union Pacific formally merged SI into its corporate structure.

At the end of 1960 SI operated 150 miles (240 km) of road on 190 miles (310 km) of track; that year it reported 141 million net ton-miles of revenue freight and zero passengers.

The line remains in operation as the Union Pacific's Spokane Subdivision, an important connection between southern British Columbia and the northwest United States.

== See also ==
- Western Pacific Railway
- Train Dreams, a film featuring the construction of the line
