= 11th World Scout Jamboree =

1963 jamboree in Marathon, Greece

- 11th World Scout Jamboree logo
- Location: Marathon, Greece
- Country: Greece
- Date: 1963
- Attendance: 13,700 Scouts
Previous; 10th World Scout Jamboree	Next; 12th World Scout Jamboree
- Website http://www.marathon1963.com/

The 11th World Scout Jamboree was held from 1–11 August 1963 in Marathon, Greece.

== Jamboree activities ==
The Jamboree Camp had 11 sub-camps for the participating Scouts and 5 sub-camps for administrative and technical personnel, and covered a total area of about 5 square kilometres. The Camp Chief was Demetrios Alexatos.

The focus of the camp was the "Greek Village" which offered sights and sounds, food and entertainment from all over Greece. There was also a 20,000-seat amphitheatre, and refreshment stands and expositions all around camp.

There was an Olympic theme to the Jamboree, with the triathlon and other sporting events taking place. A major event was the "Labours of Hercules" - a series of tasks designed to test the strength, skill, and stamina of participants.

The largest group of attendees was the British contingent, with almost 1,200 Scouts (the largest UK Scout airlift ever).

The Chief Scout of Greece, Crown Prince Constantine, attended every one of the event's 11 days. At a special ceremony, the Chief Scout of the Commonwealth 11th Baronet Maclean of Duart (later 7th Baron Mclean of Duart and Morven) awarded the Crown Prince with the Silver Wolf - the highest award of The Scout Association of the United Kingdom.

The World Chief Guide Olave Baden-Powell, wife of The Founder, spoke at the closing ceremony:

"I want to coin a new word for you to remember;
the word is "welgo". Go well now on your way, carrying
with you the light of Scouting like the Marathon torch,
and work well, play well, and spread the ideal of Scouting
as far as you possibly can.
We trust you Scouts of the World to help bring about the
reign of peace and goodwill in all the world. Welgo to you all!"

Following the speech, a torch was handed to an American Scout, to be rekindled at the 12th World Scout Jamboree in the United States.

== Tragedy ==
Flags at the Jamboree were placed at half-mast in mourning after the bulk of the Boy Scouts of the Philippines (BSP) contingent died in the crash of United Arab Airlines Flight 869 at 0150 hours on 28 July 1963, in the Arabian Sea nine nautical miles from Madh Island, Bombay (now Mumbai), India.

Most of the scouts from other countries had already arrived in Greece for the Jamboree. Preparations for the event continued as planned.

Nevertheless, the BSP sent a token delegation of three Scouts to Marathon some days after the crash, in addition to several BSP officials who had arrived in Greece ahead of the accident.
