= Girl Scout Senior Roundup =

- Country: United States
- Date: 1956 onwards

There have been several Girl Scout Senior Roundups held by the Girl Scouts of the USA, gatherings meant to show off the best of Girl Scouting. Girl Guides and Girl Scouts from other countries were invited to attend as well. International Senior Roundups were held every three years from 1956 until 1965; in 1966 the planned 1968 Senior Roundup was canceled and the intent became to have many regional events that more girls could attend. Since then, unlike National Scout Jamborees, there is no attempt to hold the Senior Roundups at regular intervals.

The Roundup was considered to be the highlight of a Girl Scout's career, including many requirements to apply for a slot and stiff competition. Generally, eight girls were chosen to represent each Girl Scout council, with two alternates also chosen. Those eight girls formed a single patrol, which would join three other patrols intentionally chosen from three other geographical areas to form one troop. Two adults were selected to be leaders. All attendees had to attend training and encampments in their regions to prepare for the Roundup. Roundup Camp uniforms were required, and the Seniors often traveled to the Roundup in the full Senior dress uniform.

A Roundup Reunion to celebrate Girl Scouting's 100 Anniversary was to be held in September 2012 in Vergennes, Vermont.

== Milford, Michigan, 1956 ==
The first Roundup was held at Highland State Park, Milford, Michigan, from June 29 to July 10, 1956. The theme was "Americana", all troops were asked to submit items for the "Arts and Crafts" exhibit at the Roundup, the best entries were selected and sent from each council. In cooperation with GSUSA, the United States Forest Service issued two posters showing Smokey Bear with a Senior Girl Scout in Roundup uniform. In total about 5,000 Senior Girl Scouts attended, representing all 48 states and the territories of Alaska and Hawaii, Puerto Rico and several foreign countries.

== Colorado Springs, Colorado, 1959 ==
The second Roundup was held at Colorado Springs, Colorado, adjacent to the site of the then-new United States Air Force Academy, from July 3 to July 12, 1959, attended by 10,000 girls. This Roundup had two themes, "New Frontiers" and "A Mile High, A World Wide".

== Button Bay, Vermont, 1962 ==
Button Bay State Park was the site of the third Roundup. The camp was held from July 18 to July 31, 1962, and attended by some 9,000 Girl Scouts from around the world. The theme was "Honor the Past, Serve the Future".

== Farragut Wildlife Area, Idaho/Verona, Italy, 1965 ==
Farragut Wildlife Area in Idaho was the site of the fourth encampment, from July 17 to July 26, 1965, with 12,000 girls. The theme was "On the Trail of Tomorrow".

An alternative Senior Girl Scout Roundup was held in Verona, Italy for GSUSA members who lived in Europe, the Near East and North Africa as well as other Girl Scout and Guides of the area. 117 members attended. "Blazing a Trail in Friendship" was the motto of the 12-day event.

== Diamond Jubilee Roundup, Farragut, Idaho, 1986 ==
GSUSA held a 1986 Diamond Jubilee Roundup in Farragut, Idaho, to mark the 75th anniversary of GSUSA in 1987. The Roundup had about 3,000 Girl Scouts and Girl Guides from 11 countries in attendance. There were two living areas, Gold and Silver, and the subcamps were named after gems. The camp shirt was white with the iron-on logo; instructions were sent with where to iron the patch on the shirt. Green hats were given to leaders, blue hats to staff and white hats to girls.

Another Diamond Jubilee Roundup was in southern California in 1987.

== See also ==
- National Scout jamboree (Boy Scouts of America)
