= 12th World Scout Jamboree =

Scouting event

- Theme: For Friendship
- Location: Farragut State Park
- Country: United States
- Date: July 31 to August 9, 1967
- Attendance: 12,011 Scouts
Previous; 11th World Scout Jamboree	Next; 13th World Scout Jamboree

The 12th World Scout Jamboree was held from July 31 to August 9, 1967, and was hosted by the United States at Farragut State Park, in the Rocky Mountains of Idaho. It was the second World Scout Jamboree to take place in North America.

== History ==
With its theme For Friendship, the 12th World Jamboree attracted 12,011 Scouts from 105 countries. The latter included Scouts from Somalia, and 1,300 representatives from the United Kingdom, the largest Scouting contingent from outside North America. For the British Scouts, dressed in their new uniforms, it was a highlight to their Diamond Jubilee Year. Other countries represented included Canada, France, Indonesia, Jamaica, the Philippines, and Sweden.

Amongst the distinguished visitors were World Chief Guide Olave Baden-Powell, actor James Stewart and Vice President of the United States, Hubert H. Humphrey. Memorable features of the Jamboree included a reconstruction of Baden-Powell's Brownsea Island campsite, arena shows, Skill-o-Rama, adventure trail, the specially stocked fishing area and boating and other water activities on Lake Pend Oreille, in addition to a visit to a rodeo and a repeat of the Friendship Wide Game introduced at the 11th World Scout Jamboree in 1963.

== See also ==
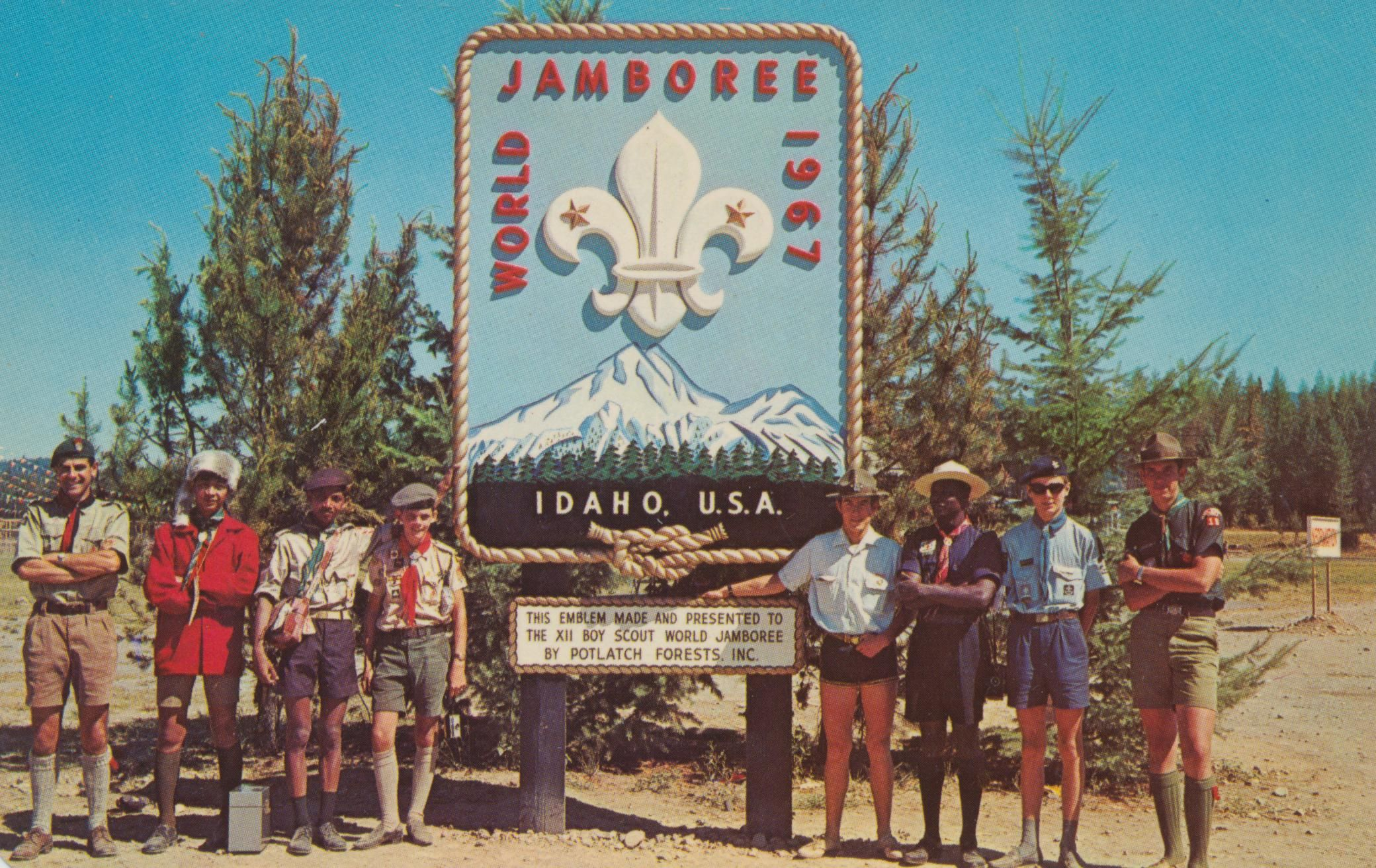
XII Boy Scout World Jamboree

- World Scout Jamboree
- Scouting in Idaho
