= Farragut Wildlife Management Area =

Protected area in Idaho, United States

- IUCN category IV (habitat/species management area)
- Location within Idaho
- Location: Kootenai County, Idaho, United States
- Nearest city: Bayview, ID
- Coordinates: 47.978°N 116.581°W
- Area: 1,413 acres (5.7 km^{2})
- Established: 1949
- Governing body: Idaho Department of Fish and Game

Farragut Wildlife Management Area at 1,405 acres (5.69 km^{2}) is an Idaho wildlife management area in Kootenai County that borders Farragut State Park. The area was formerly the Farragut Naval Training Station established in 1942 and decommissioned in 1946. The land was acquired by the Idaho Department of Fish and Game in 1949.

The WMA is located along Lake Pend Oreille, which contains a variety of sport fish, including rainbow trout. The WMA has a white-tailed deer population that average 5-10 deer per square mile.
