= Garwood, Idaho =

Unincorporated community in the state of Idaho, United States

- Unincorporated community
- Location within Idaho Location within the United States
- Coordinates: 47°49′55″N 116°46′39″W
- Country: United States
- State: Idaho
- County: Kootenai
- Elevation: 2,146 ft (654 m)
- Time zone: UTC-8 (Pacific (PST))
  - Summer (DST): UTC-7 (PDT)
- Area codes: 208, 986
- GNIS feature ID: 396533

Garwood is an unincorporated community in northern Kootenai County, Idaho, United States.

== Geography ==
Garwood is in section 25 of Township 52N Range 4W, in the northwestern part of the county, 11 miles (18 km) north of Coeur d'Alene.

== History ==
Garwood was named for the timber products of the Ohio Match Company. The community was established in 1905.

US Highway 95 and a line of the Union Pacific Railroad were built through Garwood. A rail line was also constructed between Garwood and Burnt Cabin Creek in 1924. Among the businesses in Garwood were the Ryan grocery store, which burned in 1913.

Garwood's population was 18 in 1925, and was 50 in 1940.

Garwood Elementary School is located nearby. Constructed in 1991, It is also used as a local polling place.

== See also ==
- Lane, Idaho
