= Farragut Naval Training Station =

U.S. Navy training center during World War II

- Bayview, Idaho, U.S. Near Sandpoint, Coeur d'Alene, Spokane, WA
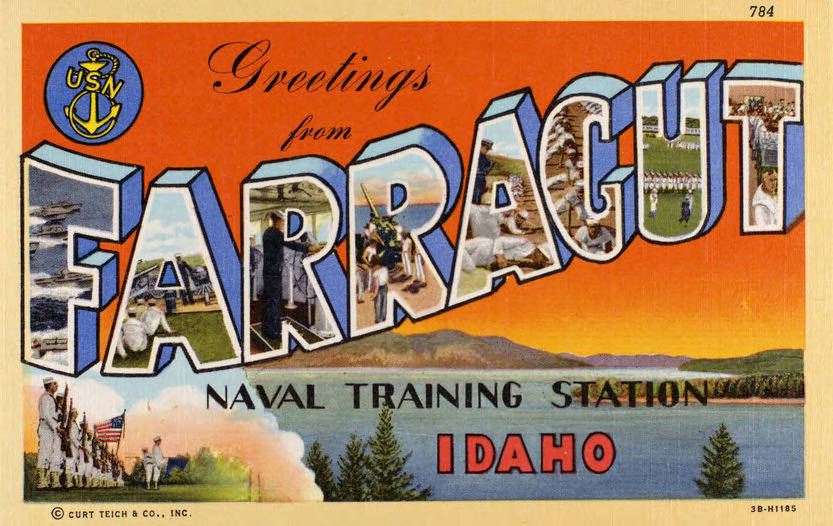
- Curt Teich large-letter postcard 1943

Site information
- Owner: United States of America
- Controlled by: United States Navy

Location
- Coordinates: 47.965°N 116.582°W

Site history
- Built: 1942
- In use: 1942–1946
- Battles/wars: World War II

Garrison information
- Past commanders: Captain Frank H. Kelley (1943–46); Captain Ingram C. Sowell (1942–43)
- Garrison: Recruit Training

Farragut Naval Training Station was a U.S. Navy training center during World War II in the Western United States. It was located in Northern Idaho at the south end of Lake Pend Oreille at Bayview, between Coeur d'Alene and Sandpoint. The base was named after David Farragut (1801–1870), the first admiral in the U.S. Navy and the leading naval officer during the Civil War. The site became Farragut State Park 60 years ago in 1966.

== World War II ==
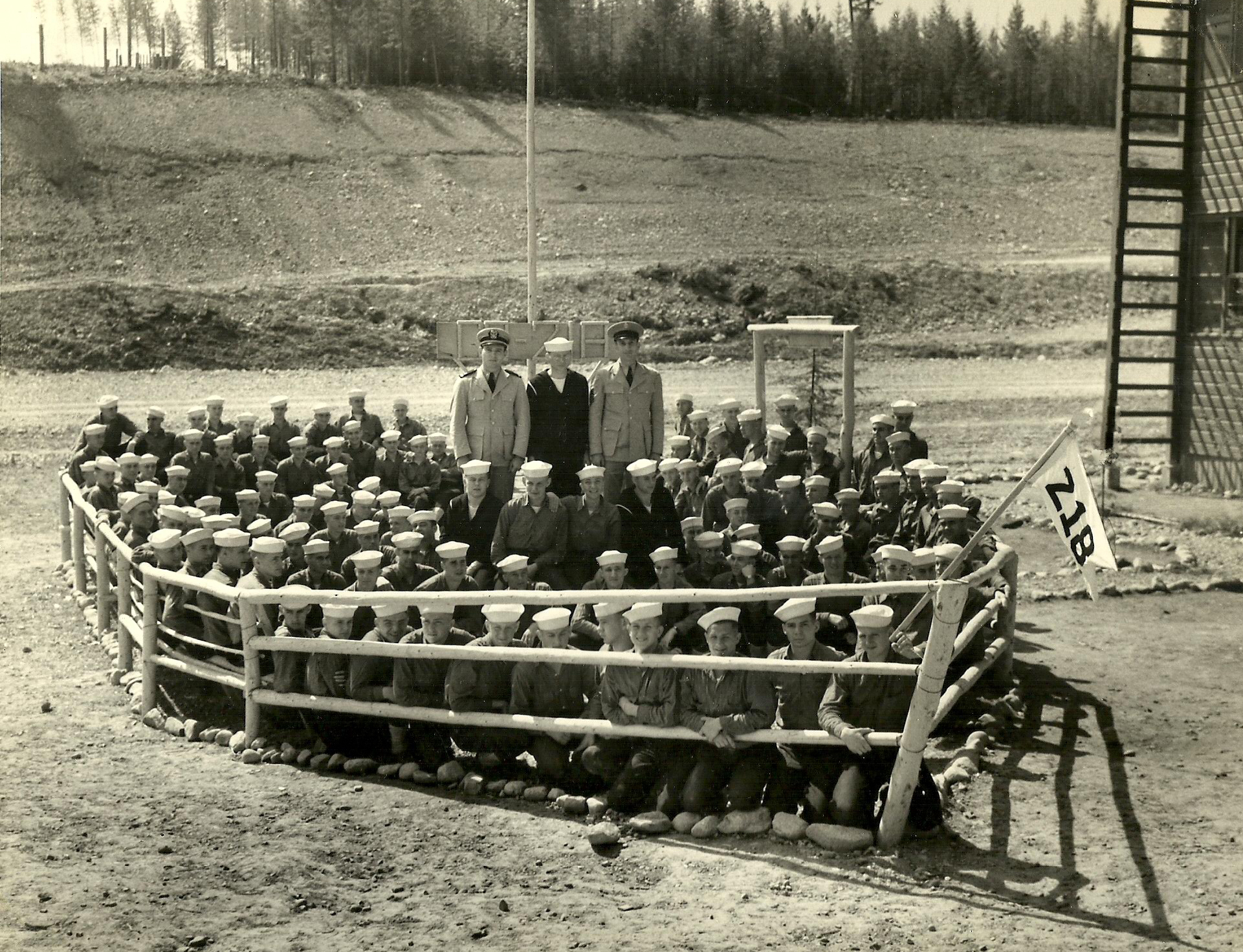
Farragut NTS, Idaho Class 218, ca. 1943

Ground was broken on the 4,160-acre (6.5 sq mi; 16.8 km^{2}) naval reservation in March 1942, and timber was cleared. Its first phase opened in early August; by September the base had a population of 55,000, making it the largest "city" in the state. At the time, Farragut was the second-largest training center in the world (behind Naval Station Great Lakes near Chicago), and liberty trains ran three times daily to Spokane, Washington, about an hour away.

Rail service aboard the station was provided by the Northern Pacific Railway over a 5½-mile (9 km) line that connected to the NP main line at Athol. The first freight train reached the facility on 5 June 1942.

A shipment of 75 lifeboats, removed from passenger liners held in port by war restrictions, was received in June 1942, and Wallace-born movie star Lana Turner, who was promoting War Bonds to base contract employees, made an appearance. The installation was formally activated in mid-September; a few days later, it was visited by President Roosevelt, part of a nationwide tour which was kept secret until he returned to the White House.

In 1942, Lt. Commander Henry T. McMaster, supervisor of support services at the station, contracted photographer Ross Hall to produce group and portrait photos of all recruits and companies. Operator of a studio in nearby Sandpoint, Hall employed up to fifteen workers in creating a photographic archive of more than 300,000 images.

The base was used as a prisoner of war camp in 1945, run by the U.S. Army; nearly 900 Germans, most captured shortly after D-Day, worked as gardeners and maintenance personnel. The POW's removed eight inches (20 cm) of snow from the football field just prior to the game against the visiting University of Idaho Vandals on 10 November, 1945. Migrating deer were a traffic hazard and hunting was prohibited on federal property.

Over 293,000 sailors received basic training at Farragut during its 30 months of existence. The last recruit graduated in March 1945 and the facility was decommissioned in June 1946.

== Post-war ==
From 1946–49, it was the site of the Farragut College and Technical Institute, which had copious athletic facilities. It ceased operations prior to the fall term in 1949, due to decreased enrollment and financial difficulties.

In 1950, 3,854 acres (1,560 ha) were transferred to the Idaho Department of Fish and Game and became Farragut Wildlife Management Area. In 1964, 2,566 acres (1,040 ha) were transferred back to the federal government. This land was then deeded back to the state of Idaho and became Farragut State Park in 1966.

A remaining military feature of the state park is the Museum at the Brig, located in the confinement facility of the naval training station. Its displays include boot camp, naval, and war memorabilia as well as historic prison cells.

Don Samuelson, a future governor, was stationed at Farragut as a weapons instructor. Originally from Illinois in the Midwest, he stayed in Sandpoint after the war and was elected governor in 1966.

The Drill Hall at the base was shipped to Colorado after the war and became the University of Denver Arena, which served for nearly a half century as the home of DU Pioneers ice hockey. It was razed in 1997 to make way for the current Magness Arena.

The Navy has maintained a presence on Lake Pend Oreille at Bayview with its Acoustic Research Detachment, part of the Carderock Division of the Naval Surface Warfare Center. In the deep (1,150 feet (350 m)) and isolated waters of Lake Pend Oreille, scaled-down prototypes of submarines are tested; a free-field ocean-like environment is available without the problems and costs.

== See also ==
- Ohio Match Company Railway
