= United Arab Airlines Flight 869 (1962) =

Aviation accident in Thailand in 1962

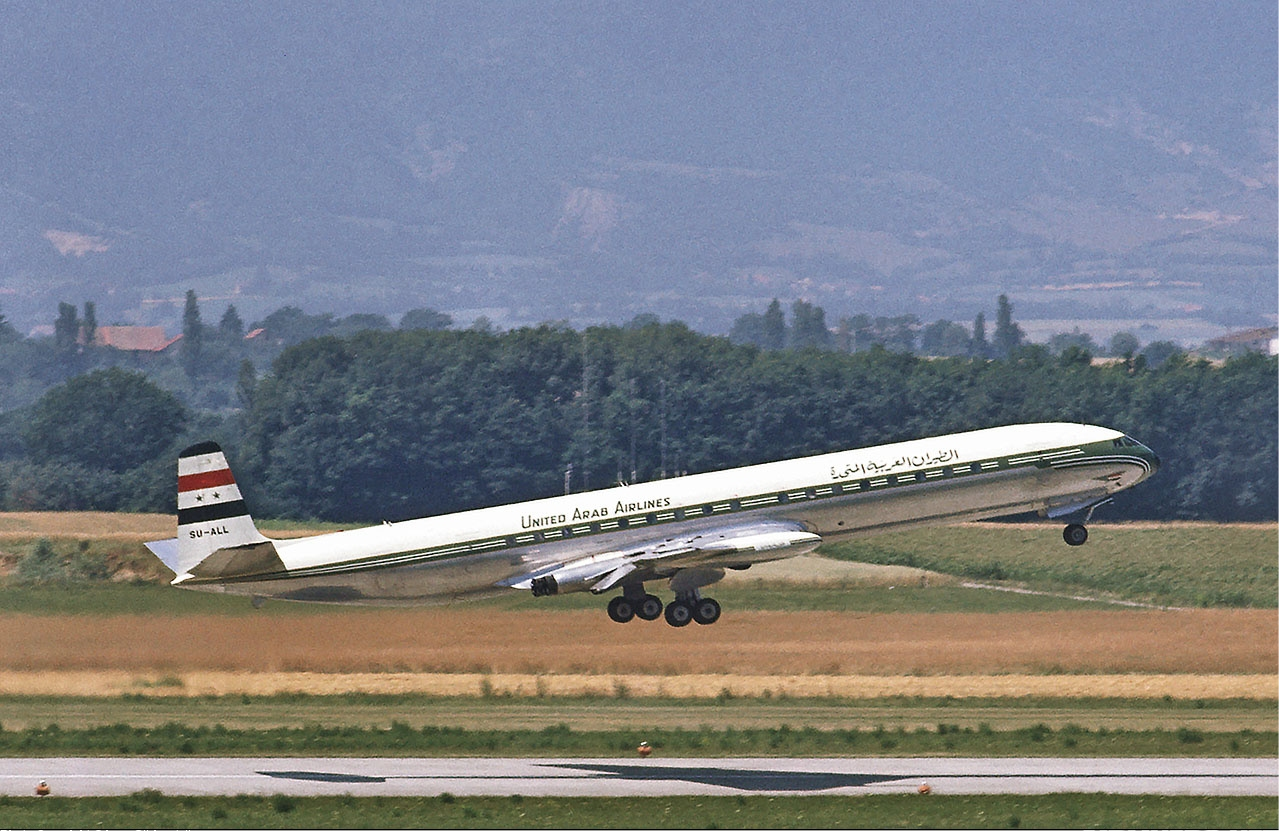
- A de Havilland Comet of United Arab Airlines, similar to the aircraft involved

Accident
- Date: 19 July 1962
- Summary: Controlled flight into terrain
- Site: Khao Yai mountain Nakhon Nayok province, Thailand

Aircraft
- Aircraft type: de Havilland DH-106 Comet 4C
- Operator: United Arab Airlines
- Registration: SU-AMW
- Flight origin: Kai Tak Airport, Hong Kong, China
- Stopover: Don Mueang International Airport, Bangkok, Thailand
- Destination: Cairo International Airport, Cairo, United Arab Republic
- Occupants: 26
- Passengers: 18
- Crew: 8
- Fatalities: 26
- Survivors: 0

United Arab Airlines Flight 869 was an international scheduled passenger flight operated by a de Havilland DH-106 Comet 4C from Hong Kong via Bangkok to Cairo. On 19 July 1962 at 13:30 UTC, the plane departed from Hong Kong for the first leg of the flight with 18 passengers and 8 crew aboard. The flight was uneventful until commencing approach to Bangkok, when the plane crashed in the Khao Yai mountain range 96 km NE of Bangkok at 15:44 UTC. There were no survivors.

The investigation found a sequence of mistakes in the navigation by the pilot-in-command as a probable cause, which "resulted in grave errors of time and distance in his computations".

== Aircraft ==
The aircraft was a de Havilland DH-106 Comet 4C with construction number 6464, delivered to United Arab Airlines in 1962. At the time of the accident, it had been in service with the airline for only three months.

It was equipped with dual VOR receivers, Doppler and automatic direction finders.

== Accident ==
Flight 869 took off from Hong Kong Kai Tak Airport for the first leg of its journey to Cairo. After takeoff, the aircraft climbed to 31,000 feet (9,400 m).

At 15:08 UTC, the aircraft entered the Bangkok Flight Information Region boundary, and established contact with Bangkok Air Traffic Control at 15:14. Upon initial contact, the flight advised ATC that they had passed the Ubol NDB at 15:13 UTC, and requested to fly direct to the Bangkok VOR. This request was granted, and at 15:17, the crew reported their estimated time of arrival (ETA) at the VOR as 15:47. A further report gave the ETA of their crossing at the 100-mile (87 nmi; 160 km) perimeter from the VOR at 15:30 UTC.

The aircraft reported that they crossed the 100-mile perimeter at 15:29, switching to Bangkok Control. Upon initial contact with Bangkok control at 15:30, the crew requested descent, reporting their position to be 90 miles (78 nmi; 140 km) out from the VOR. Bangkok Control then instructed the crew to descend to 4,000 feet (1,200 m) while tracking on the 073 radial of the Bangkok VOR. This instruction was acknowledged by the crew. During the descent, the crew was advised of the weather conditions at Bangkok and to contact Bangkok Approach control at 15:39 UTC.

Bangkok Approach Control took responsibility for the aircraft at 15:40 UTC. Upon first contact, the crew gave a new ETA at the VOR as 15:44, and reported that they were descending from 13,000 feet (4,000 m). Approach control cleared the aircraft for an approach to runway 21R after crossing the VOR.

Contact was lost at 15:50. It was estimated the aircraft crashed at 15:44-15:45 UTC.

== Investigation ==
It was determined that the aircraft had a ground speed of 455 mph (395 kn; 732 km/h). Using this ground speed, the aircraft was actually 137 miles (119 nmi; 220 km) from the Bangkok VOR instead of the 90 miles (78 nmi; 140 km) during the position report at 15:39.

== Sources ==
- "Accident description". Aviation Safety Network.
