= United Arab Airlines Flight 869 (1963) =

Flight that crashed in 1963

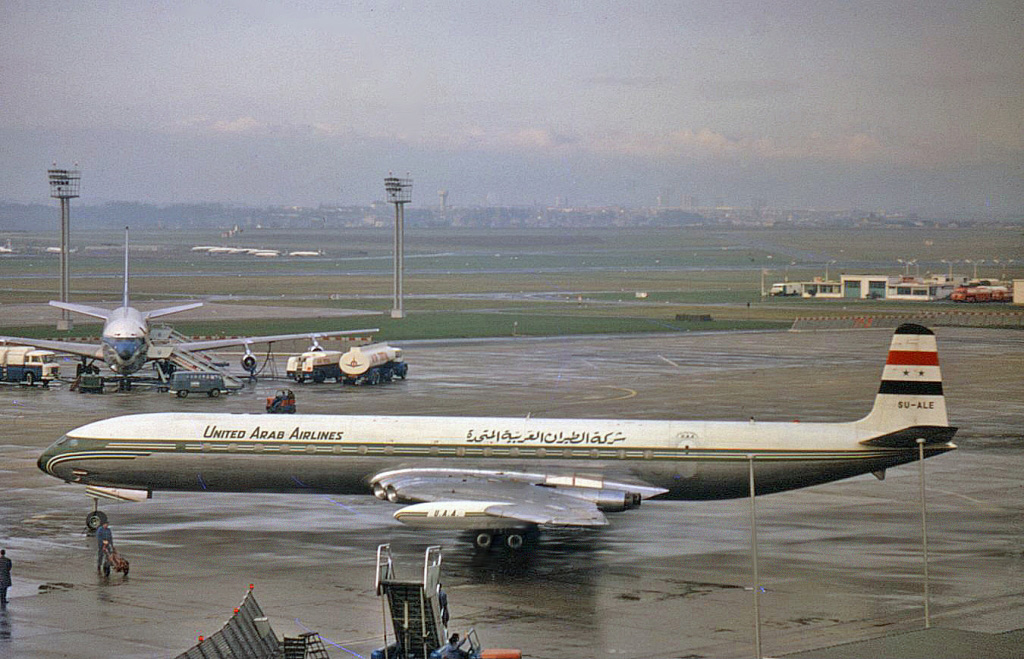
- A de Havilland DH.106 Comet of United Arab Airlines, similar to the crashed aircraft

Accident
- Date: 28 July 1963
- Summary: Loss of control in turbulent weather
- Site: In the sea 10 km (6.2 mi) from Bombay Airport, India

Aircraft
- Aircraft type: de Havilland Comet 4C
- Operator: United Arab Airlines (now known as Egyptair)
- Registration: SU-ALD
- Flight origin: Tokyo International Airport, Tokyo, Japan
- 1st stopover: Kai Tak Airport, Hong Kong
- 2nd stopover: Don Mueang International Airport, Bangkok, Thailand
- 3rd stopover: Bombay – Santa Cruz Airport, Bombay, India
- Last stopover: Bahrain International Airport, Manama, Bahrain
- Destination: Cairo International Airport, Cairo, United Arab Republic
- Occupants: 63
- Passengers: 55
- Crew: 8
- Fatalities: 63
- Survivors: 0

United Arab Airlines Flight 869 was an international scheduled passenger de Havilland Comet 4C flight from Tokyo, Japan, to Cairo via Hong Kong, Bangkok, Bombay and Bahrain. On 28 July 1963 it was being operated by a de Havilland Comet registered as SU-ALD, when on approach to Bombay's Santa Cruz Airport it crashed into the Arabian Sea off Bombay on 28 July 1963 with the loss of all 63 passengers and crew on board. Among the 55 passengers was the Philippine delegation of 24 Boy Scouts and adults traveling to the 11th World Scout Jamboree in Greece.

== Accident ==
At 1:46 a.m. in Mumbai on 28 July 1963 (20:16 GMT on 27 July), the Comet crew reported being overhead the Santa Cruz VOR beacon at 7,000 feet (2,100 m) and were cleared to descend to 4,000 feet (1,200 m). The crew requested an instrument landing system approach to runway 09 and that they would follow the back beam procedure. The Air Traffic Control informed them the procedure was not available and they should carry out an approach using the VOR beacon. The crew agreed to use the procedure and reported leaving 7,000 feet (2,100 m) in the descent on the 272-degree radial from the VOR. The controller advised them that they might encounter heavy turbulence if they went more than six or seven miles (5.2 or 6.1 nmi; 9.7 or 11.3 km) west of the airport. The crew requested a left-hand procedure rather than the more normal right-hand one because of the weather. Permission was granted and the aircraft, already in severe turbulence, entered a left-hand turn and then crashed into the sea at 1:50 a.m., nine nautical miles (10 mi; 17 km) from Madh Island.

== Probable cause ==
Because no wreckage was salvaged and the crew did not report any problems, it was concluded that the aircraft was probably lost due to loss of control while turning in severe turbulence and heavy rain.

== Boy Scouts of the Philippines scouting contingent ==
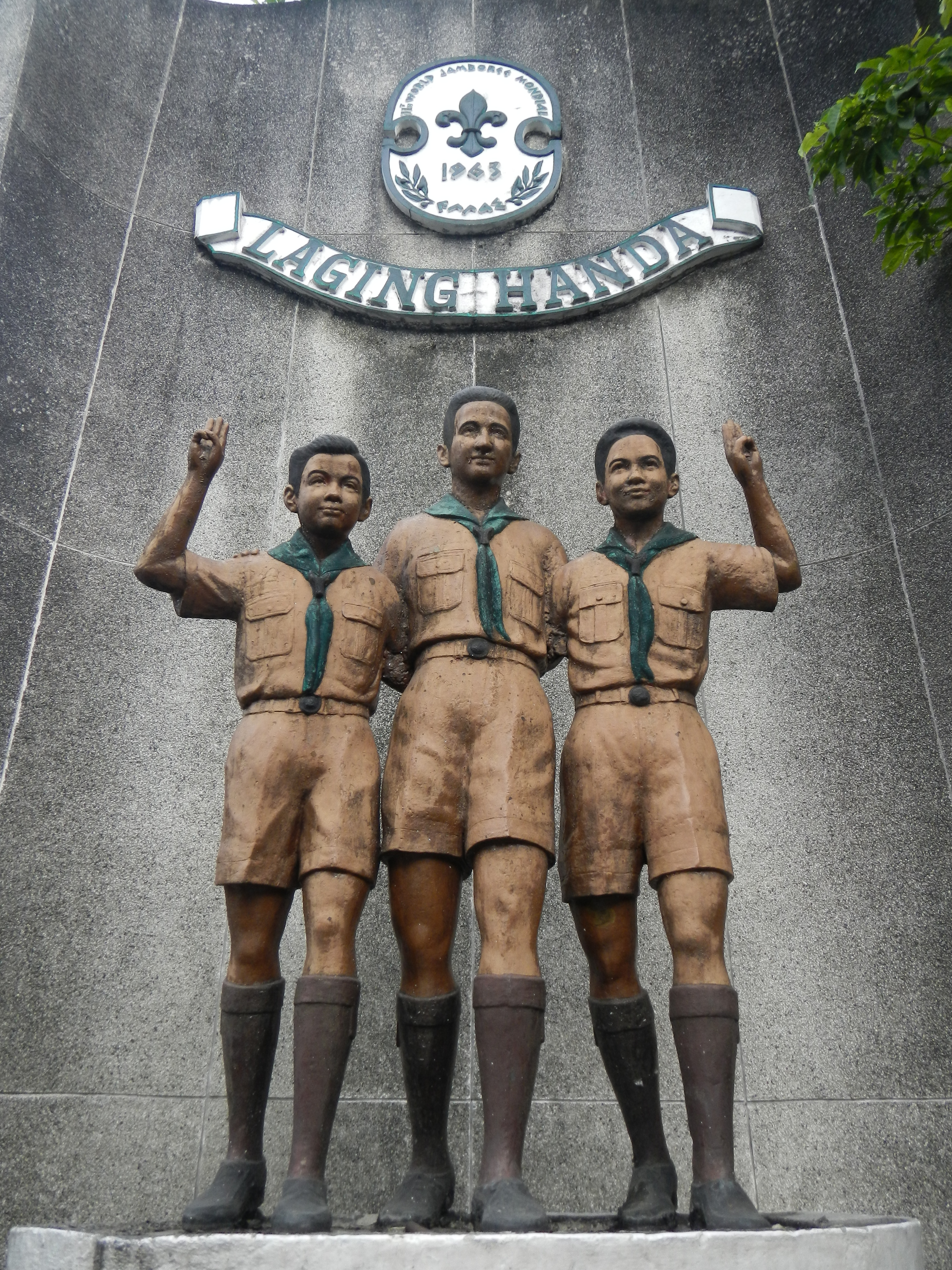
Colegio de San Juan de Letran monument of Ramon Albano, Henry Chuatoco and Wilfredo Santiago of the Manila Scout Council

24 scouts and scouting officials of the Boy Scouts of the Philippines were headed to the 11th World Scout Jamboree in Marathon, Greece. From Manila, the delegation took a KLM flight to Hong Kong to catch the United Arab Airlines 869 connecting flight to Athens. The Filipino delegation were among the 63 killed in the crash.

From Manila Boy Scout Council:

- Ramon V. Albano
- Henry Chuatoco
- Jose Antonio Delgado
- Pedro Gandia
- Gabriel Borromeo
- Wilfredo Santiago and
- Ascario Tuason, Jr.

From Quezon City Council:

- Roberto Castor
- Romeo R. Rallos and
- Rogelio Ybardolaza.

The remainder of the scouts:

- Victor de Guia, Jr. (Baguio City)
- Antonio Limbaga (Zamboanga City)
- Roberto Lozano (Dagupan City)
- Paulo Madriñan (Pasay City)
- Patricio Dulay Bayoran Jr. (Negros Occidental Council)
- Jose Fermin Magbanua (Negros Oriental)
- Filamor Reyes (Cavite)
- Antonio Torillo (Cavite)
- Benecio Tobias (Tarlac) and
- Felix Fuentebella, Jr. (both Manila and Goa, Camarines Sur Councils)

BSP scouters that died in the crash:

- Scoutmaster and Physician, Bonifacio Vitan Lazcano, M.D.
- Chaplain Fr. Jose Agcaoili Martinez, S.J.
- Assistant Scoutmaster Librado L. S. Fernandez
- Assistant Scoutmaster Florante Lirio Ojeda

These scouts are commemorated at both the 11th World Scout Jamboree Memorial Rotonda and the Colegio de San Juan de Letran monument shown above. In addition, the streets around the rotonda are named after the scouts and scouters who perished; the area is now colloquially known as the "Scout Area".

== Bibliography ==
- World Accident Summary. Civil Aviation Authority (United Kingdom). 1974. ISBN 0-903083-44-2.
