= Farragut State Park =

State park in Idaho, United States

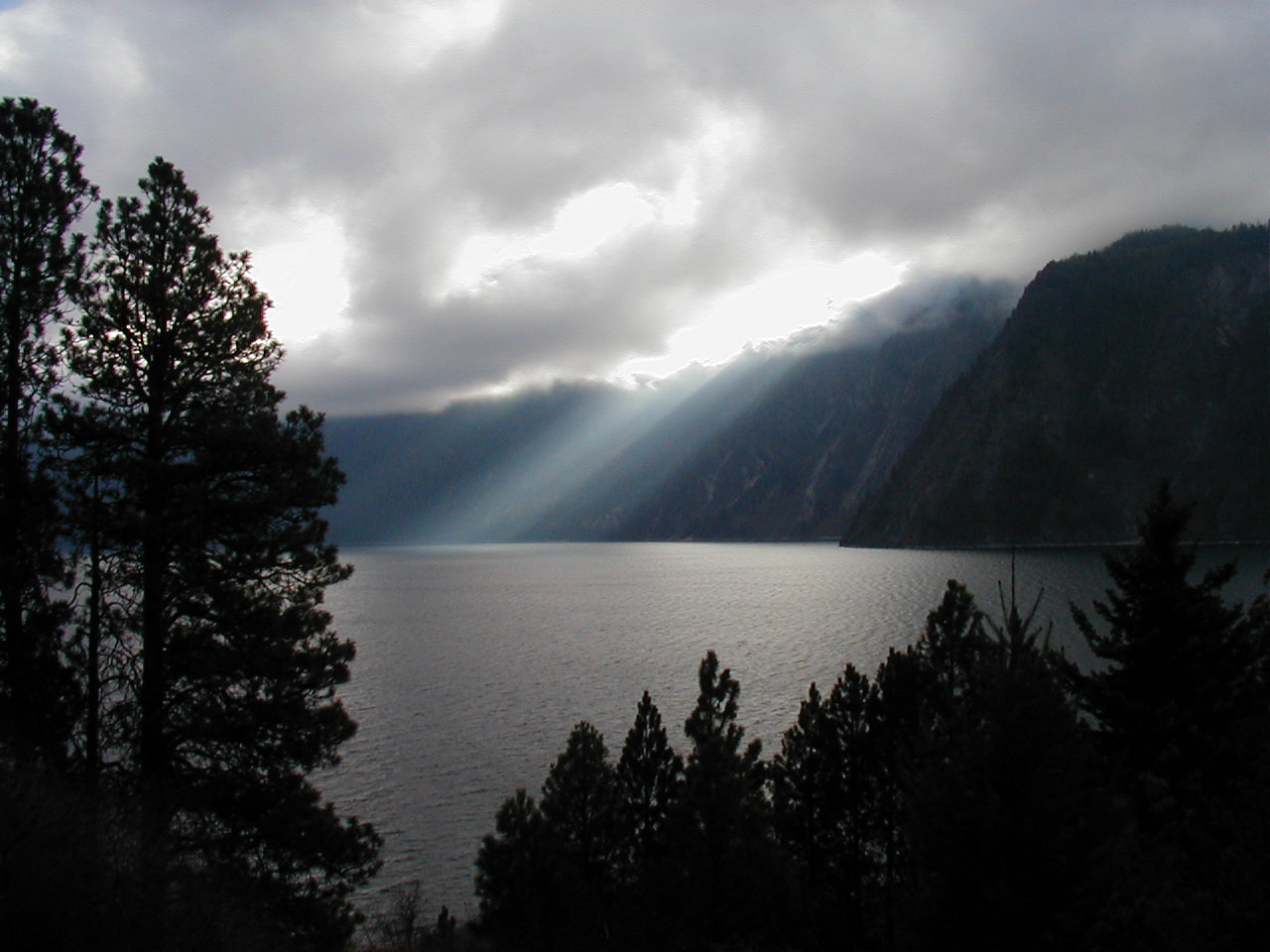
- Lake Pend Oreille from Farragut State Park

- Location within the United States Location within Idaho
- Location: Kootenai County, Idaho, U.S.
- Nearest city: Athol
- Coordinates: 47°57′05″N 116°36′08″W
- Area: 4,000 acres (6.3 sq mi; 16 km^{2})
- Elevation: 2,054 feet (626 m) AMSL
- Established: 1966; 60 years ago
- Administrator: Idaho Department of Parks and Recreation
- Website: Official website

Farragut State Park is a public recreation area in the northwest United States, located in northern Idaho at the southern tip of Lake Pend Oreille in the Coeur d'Alene Mountains. The 4,000-acre (6.3 sq mi; 16 km^{2}) state park is five miles (8 km) east of Athol in Kootenai County, about thirty miles (50 km) northeast of Coeur d'Alene. Activities include camping, picnicking, hiking, mountain biking, cycling, fishing, boating, swimming, water sports, orienteering, disc golf, flying model aircraft, archery, and horseback riding.

== History ==
=== Naval training base ===
The park grounds were formerly the Farragut Naval Training Station, a major training base of the U.S. Navy during World War II. Over 293,000 sailors received basic training at Farragut during its 30 months of existence. The last recruit graduated in March 1945 and the facility was decommissioned in June 1946.

=== College ===
From 1946–49, it was the site of the Farragut College and Technical Institute, which had copious athletic facilities. It ceased operations prior to the fall term in 1949, due to decreased enrollment and financial difficulties.

=== State park ===
In 1950, the federal government transferred 3,854 acres (6.0 sq mi; 15.6 km^{2}) of the former Farragut Naval Training Center to the Idaho department of fish and game, creating the Farragut Wildlife Management Area. The department transferred 2,566 acres (4.0 sq mi; 10.4 km^{2}) back to the federal government in 1964; this was deeded to the state parks department and became Farragut State Park by an act of the state legislature in 1966.

=== Scouting ===
Farragut State Park is significant in the history of Scouting in Idaho. It hosted the National Girl Scout Senior Roundup in 1965, the World Scout Jamboree in 1967, the National Scout Jamboree in 1969 and 1973, and the 2002 Star Northwest of the Boy Scouts of America. The world event in 1967 was the only time it had been held in the United States until 2019.

While traveling to the moon aboard Apollo 11 on July 18, 1969, astronaut Neil Armstrong extended a greeting to the Scouts attending the national jamboree in Idaho. Armstrong was an Eagle Scout from Ohio. Frank Borman, astronaut and commander of Apollo 8, addressed the Scouts, as did Lady Baden-Powell, the widow of Scouting's founder. At the Jamboree in 1973, Admiral Elmo Zumwalt, Chief of Naval Operations, and Gene Cernan, astronaut and commander of Apollo 17, addressed the Scouts.

== Wildlife ==
The residential animals of this state park are bass, trout, white-tailed deer, moose, elk, mountain goat, cougar, and black bear.

== Activities and amenities ==
The park offers traditional recreational opportunities such as picnicking, boating, swimming, hiking, and camping, as well as disc golf, a model airplane flying field, the Naval Training Center and a museum. A remaining military feature is the Museum at the Brig, located in the confinement facility of the naval training station. Its displays include boot camp, naval, and war memorabilia as well as historic prison cells.

== See also ==
- List of Idaho state parks
- National Parks in Idaho
