= Idaho State Highway 58 =

State highway in Kootenai County, Idaho, United States

State Highway 58
- SH-58 highlighted in red

Route information
- Maintained by ITD
- Length: 2.943 mi (4.736 km)
- Existed: 1950s–present

Major junctions
- West end: SR 278 at Washington state line
- East end: US 95 near Worley

Location
- Country: United States
- State: Idaho
- Counties: Kootenai

Highway system
- Idaho State Highway System; Interstate; US; State
| ← SH-57 | → SH-60 |

State Highway 58 (SH-58) is a 3-mile (4.8 km) state highway in Kootenai County in the Idaho Panhandle of Idaho, United States. It connects Washington State Route 278 (east of Rockford) with U.S. Route 95 (US 95) and west of Worley. The highway is maintained by the Idaho Transportation Department and lies entirely within the Coeur d'Alene Reservation.

== Route description ==
SH-58 begins at a junction with Washington State Route 278 at the Washington state line east of Rockford. From there, the highway heads east through rural Kootenai County before turning to the southeast to cross and then follow North Fork Rock Creek. The route curves east alongside the creek and intersects US 95 at an interchange, its eastern terminus. The road continues as South Nukwalqw Street, which serves the Coeur d'Alene Casino and Circling Raven Golf Club near Worley. The entire highway is located on the Coeur d'Alene Reservation.

== History ==
Construction on a new freeway for US-95 between Worley and Lake Creek, which would bypass the original eastern terminus of SH-58, began in 2007. SH-58 was rerouted in 2008 to a new interchange on the south side of North Fork Rock Creek that also served the Coeur d'Alene Casino.

== Major intersections ==
The entire route is in Kootenai County.

| Location | mi | km | Destinations | Notes |
|---|---|---|---|---|
| | 0.000 | 0.000 | SR 278 west – Rockford | Continuation into Washington |
| | 2.943 | 4.736 | US 95 north – Coeur d'Alene, Worley, Casino | Interchange; continues east as South Nukwalqw Street |
1.000 mi = 1.609 km; 1.000 km = 0.621 mi

== See also ==
- List of state highways in Idaho
