= Worley (surname) =

Worley is a surname. Notable people with the surname include:

- Al Worley (1946–2020), American football player
- Allen B. Worley, American admiral
- Anna Lee Keys Worley (died 1961), American politician
- Barbara Worley (1934–2014), Australian sports administrator
- Becky Worley (born 1971), American journalist and broadcaster
- Billie Worley, American actor
- Brian Worley (born 1972), American television host
- Charles Worley (1853–1906), British architect
- Chris Worley (born 1995), American football player
- Daniel Worley (1829–1888), American politician from Ohio
- Daryl Worley (born 1995), American football player
- Darryl Worley (born 1964), American country singer and songwriter
- Ed Worley, American politician
- Elizabeth K. Worley (1904–2004), American zoologist and microbiologist
- Eugene Worley (1908–1974), American politician and jurist
- Francis Worley (1913–2003), American politician
- Harry Worley (born 1988), English footballer
- Henry William Worley (1877–1938), British-born American politician
- Jacob Worley (born 1969), American Anglican priest
- James D. Worley (born 1959), American convicted murderer
- Jo Anne Worley (born 1937), American television and film actress
- John Worley (1919–1999), American saxophonist and composer
- Justin Worley (born 1992), American football player
- Kate Worley (1958–2004), American comic book author
- Kenneth L. Worley (1948–1968), American marine and Medal of Honor recipient
- Laura Davis Worley (1849–1937), American dairy farmer and secretary
- Len Worley (born 1937), English footballer
- Matt Worley (born 1997), Hong Konger rugby union player
- Nancy Worley (1951–2021), American politician
- Paul Worley (born 1950), American record producer and guitarist
- Richard Worley (disambiguation), multiple people
- Rick Worley, American cartoonist
- Rob Worley, American writer and editor
- Robert Worley (architect) (1850–1930), British architect
- Robert F. Worley (1919–1968), American fighter pilot and general
- Ron Worley, American politician
- Satch Worley (born 1948) NASCAR driver
- Seth Worley (born 1984), American film director and writer
- Shayla Worley (born 1990), American gymnast
- Ted R. Worley (1906-1969), American teacher
- Tessa Worley (born 1989), French skier
- Tim Worley (born 1966), American football player
- Vance Worley (born 1987), American baseball player
- William G. Worley, American politician

== See also ==
- Worley (disambiguation)
