= Worley =

Worley may refer to:

== Places ==
- Worley, Idaho, United States
- Worley, Kentucky, United States
- Worley, West Virginia, United States
- Worley Point, Antarctica

== People ==
- Worley (surname), people with the surname Worley
- Worley baronets
- Worley Edwards (1850-1927), New Zealand lawyer and judge
- Worley Thorne, American screenwriter

== Other ==
- Worley (company), a company formerly called WorleyParsons
- Worley noise, used in computer graphics for texture generation
