= George Foreman III =

American boxer (born 1983)

Personal information
- Nickname: Monk
- Born: George Edward Foreman III; January 23, 1983 (age 43) Humble, Texas, U.S.
- Height: 6 ft 5 in (1.96 m)
- Weight: Heavyweight

Boxing career

Boxing record
- Total fights: 18
- Wins: 18
- Win by KO: 17
- Losses: 0
- Draws: 0

George Edward Foreman III (born January 23, 1983) is an American entrepreneur, professional boxer, trainer/coach, and founder of EverybodyFights. His father was businessman and former two-time heavyweight champion George Foreman Sr. He is one of Foreman Sr.'s five biological sons, all named George. Foreman Sr. also has seven daughters, five biological and two adopted, in his four marriages.

== Early life ==
As a child, Foreman watched his father train and sat ringside when his father was doing color commentary. He always loved boxing, but never got involved with the sport until his early teens. Foreman attended Fay School in Southborough, Massachusetts. He graduated from Culver Military Academy in Culver, Indiana, in 2001 with a high school diploma, where he played lacrosse. As a senior, he tutored fellow students, particularly in the subject of Latin, at the on-campus “Student Learning Center”.

When he was 19, he went to the gym to do some sparring, but never went back because he did not want his father to find out. His mother, Andrea Skeete-Foreman, never thought that he would ever become a boxer because he was so calm and would never lose his temper.

Foreman earned his BA from Rice University where he studied Business and Sports Management, and went on to serve as the business manager of his father's empire and executive vice president of George Foreman Enterprises, Inc.

Foreman starred on the E! network's reality series Filthy Rich: Cattle Drive.

== Boxing career ==
George III became focused on boxing and boxing training in his youth. He went on to pursue his own professional boxing career in 2009. After going 16-0, George Foreman III retired. He returned to the ring in 2024 and made a successful comeback. His record currently stands at 18-0.

Foreman started training for boxing in July 2009, with very similar training methods to his father – the "torture chamber", in which he dragged a Jeep as far as he could, dug holes, chopped wood and ran to the point of exhaustion.

He made his professional debut stopping Clyde Weaver at 1:16 of the first round. He floored Weaver twice: first with a left to the chin, then with a left to the body, before the referee called a halt to the match. He won his third pro fight on September 26, 2009, at the Coushatta Casino in Kinder, Louisiana, against Marvin Ray Jones by TKO in the first round. His last bout was in 2024 in Little Rock, Arkansas.

== Business ==
In 2013, George Foreman III opened a boxing fitness gym in Boston called "The Club by George Foreman III". In an effort to further promote the core beliefs of the gym's culture, George eventually changed the name of the gym to EverybodyFights. George announced in January 2021 via Instagram he was no longer affiliated with Everybodyfights. No reason was given.

In 2016, the company received a series-A investment from Breakaway in the form of four million dollars, and soon after announced the opening of another location in Boston. Since then, EverybodyFights has opened five locations, and plans to open over 20 new locations for expansion in other major cities across the United States.

== Professional boxing record ==
18 Wins (17 knockouts, 1 decision), 0 Losses, 0 Draws
Res.	Record	Opponent	Type	Rd., Time	Date	Location	Notes
Win	18–0	(United States) Juan Reyna	TKO	1 (6), 2:40	2024-06-24	(United States) Harley Davidson, Little Rock, Arkansas	
Win	17–0	(Mexico) Juan Lopez Alcaraz	TKO	2 (6), 1:04	2024-05-19	(Mexico) Evolution Club, Tijuana, Quintana Roo	Foreman's comeback.
Win	16–0	(Mexico) David Ferraez	TKO	3 (6), 2:52	2012-12-06	(Mexico) Discoteca The City, Cancún, Quintana Roo	
Win	15–0	(United States) David Robinson	TKO	1 (8), 0:33	2012-02-04	(United States) Cocopah Casino, Yuma, Arizona	
Win	14–0	(United States) Alonzo Toney	TKO	3 (6), 2:20	2011-10-27	(United States) Lonestar Event Center, Tyler, Texas	
Win	13–0	(United States) Shannon Caudle	TKO	1 (6), 1:42	2011-07-30	(United States) Hotel Fredonia, Nacogdoches, Texas	
Win	12–0	(United States) Eric Lindsey	KO	1 (6), 2:54	2011-04-09	(United States) Convention Center, Hampton, Virginia	Both boxers down once.
Win	11–0	(United States) Christopher Jones	KO	1 (4), 2:55	2011-02-25	(United States) Music Hall, Austin, Texas	
Win	10–0	(United States) David Robinson	TKO	3 (6), 1:00	2010-10-01	(United States) Hotel Fredonia, Nacogdoches, Texas	
Win	9–0	(United States) James Johnson	UD	6	2010-08-11	(United States) Shooters, Texarkana, Arkansas	
Win	8–0	(United States) Bobby Pickett	RTD	2 (4), 0:10	2010-07-13	(United States) Civic Center, Marshall, Texas	Picket down twice in rd one.
Win	7–0	(United States) Dale Mitchell	RTD	2 (4), 3:00	2010-04-03	(United States) Emerald Queen Casino, Tacoma, Washington	Mitchell down in round two.
Win	6–0	(United States) Robert Vasquez	TKO	1 (4), 2:32	2010-03-25	(United States) Coeur d'Alene Casino, Worley, Idaho	
Win	5–0	(United States) Yul Witherspoon	TKO	1 (4), 2:39	2010-01-09	(United States) Emerald Queen Casino, Tacoma, Washington	
Win	4–0	(United States) Bradley Moss	TKO	1 (4)	2009-11-14	(United States) Youth Center, Cut Off, Louisiana	
Win	3–0	(United States) Marvin Ray Jones	TKO	1 (6), 1:55	2009-09-26	(United States) Coushatta Casino Resort, Kinder, Louisiana	
Win	2–0	(United States) George Burrage	TKO	2 (4), 1:10	2009-07-31	(United States) Pan American Center, Las Cruces, New Mexico	
Win	1–0	(United States) Clyde Weaver	KO	1 (4), 1:16	2009-06-06	(United States) Coushatta Casino Resort, Kinder, Louisiana	Professional debut.

== See also ==
- Notable boxing families
