= Jason Parillo =

American Mixed Martial Arts (MMA) coach

Personal information
- Born: June 11, 1974 (age 52) New York, United States
- Weight: Super Welterweight

Boxing career
- Stance: Orthodox

Boxing record
- Total fights: 8
- Wins: 8
- Win by KO: 6

Jason Parillo (born June 11, 1974, in New York) is an American Mixed Martial Arts (MMA) coach at the RVCA Training Centre and former professional boxer. He is best known for training multiple MMA world champions.

== Background ==
Born in New York in 1974, Parillo was raised in Southern California but still returned to his birthplace each summer until he was 13. Parillo started boxing under Jesse Reid at the age of 16 and started training beginners at 18. He was 24 when entering the professional ranks, following a brief stint as an amateur with a 21–6 record. From 1998 to 2003 he was a professional boxer where he obtained an undefeated boxing Record of 8–0 with 6 knockouts. A detached retina brought an abrupt end to his boxing career. Parillo took a two-year break and began to train others full time.

Pat Tenore, founder of RVCA, and friend of Parillo, was sponsoring MMA fighter, B.J. Penn. In 2007, Penn had a rematch against Jens Pulver, a fighter known for his strong boxing, and who used this skill to win their first fight. Tenore introduced the two and Parillo began coaching Penn on boxing. Penn won the rematch against Pulver. Since then Parillo has been training many fighters including former UFC champions, Michael Bisping, Cris Cyborg, Rafael Dos Anjos and Tito Ortiz. Parillo is currently Head Coach based at a BJJ/MMA gym known as The RVCA Sport Training Center. It was built by RVCA founder Pat Tenore (who holds a black belt in Brazilian jiu-jitsu). The training facility was located in Costa Mesa, California. The training center abruptly closed in September 2023.

== Personal life ==
Parillo has twin daughters from a previous marriage.

== Notable students ==
=== Mixed martial arts ===
- B.J. Penn - Former UFC Lightweight Champion and UFC Welterweight Champion
- Michael Bisping - Former UFC Middleweight Champion
- Cris Cyborg - Former UFC Women's Featherweight Champion
- Rafael dos Anjos - Former UFC Lightweight Champion
- Tito Ortiz - Former UFC Light Heavyweight Champion
- Luke Rockhold - Former UFC Middleweight Champion
- Vitor Belfort - Former UFC Light Heavyweight Champion
- Sean Strickland - Current UFC Middleweight Champion
- Marlon Vera
- Mackenzie Dern - Current UFC Women's Strawweight champion

== Professional boxing record ==
8 fights	8 wins	0 losses
By knockout	6	0
By decision	2	0

No.	Result	Record	Opponent	Type	Round, time	Date	Location	Notes
8	Win	8–0	(United States) Reggie Strickland	UD	6	March 13, 2003	(United States) The Columbia Club, Indianapolis, Indiana, U.S.	
7	Win	7–0	(United States) Grant Messer	KO	1 (6)	February 22, 2003	(United States) Kruse World War II Museum, Auburn, Indiana, U.S.	
6	Win	6–0	(Canada) Ron Pasek	KO	6 (6)	September 13, 2002	(United States) Lucky Eagle Casino, Rochester, Washington, U.S.	
5	Win	5–0	(United States) Miguel Angel Rivas	KO	2 (4)	July 20, 2000	(United States) Marriott Hotel, Irvine, California, U.S.	
4	Win	4–0	(United States) Russell Briggs	TKO	4 (5)	December 4, 1999	(United States) Lucky Eagle Casino, Rochester, Washington, U.S.	
3	Win	3–0	(United States) Alfred Lorona	TKO	1 (4)	August 18, 1999	(United States) Coeur d'Alene Casino, Worley, Idaho, U.S.	
2	Win	2–0	(United States) Torrance Brown	UD	4	November 12, 1998	(United States) Coeur d'Alene Casino, Worley, Idaho, U.S.	
1	Win	1–0	(United States) Chris Huntwork	TKO	3 (4)	August 6, 1998	(United States) Coeur d'Alene Casino, Worley, Idaho, U.S.	
