= Robert Worley =

Robert Worley may refer to:

- Robert Worley (architect), British architect
- Robert F. Worley, United States Air Force major general and fighter pilot
- Rob Worley, American writer and editor
