= Frederick C. Blesse =

American Air Force general and flying ace (1921–2012)

Frederick Corbin Blesse
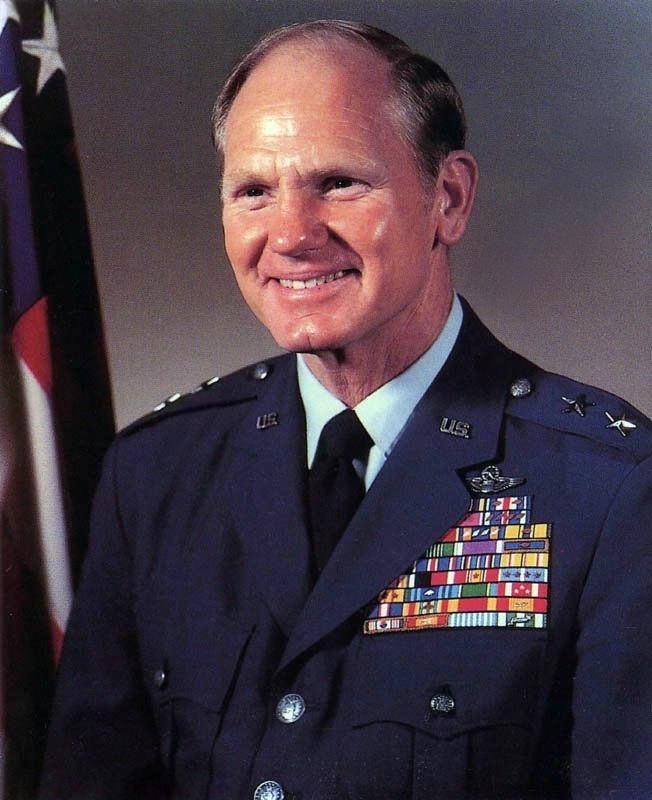
- Born: August 22, 1921; Colón, Panama Canal Zone
- Died: October 31, 2012 (aged 91); Melbourne, Florida, U.S.
- Burial place: Arlington National Cemetery
- Relatives: Betty Blesse (wife)
- Military career
- Allegiance: United States
- Branch: United States Air Force
- Service years: 1945–1975
- Rank: Major General
- Nickname: Boots
- Units: 413th Fighter Group; 18th Fighter-Bomber Group; 4th Fighter-Interceptor Wing; 366th Tactical Fighter Wing
- Commands: 32nd Fighter Interceptor Squadron; 474th Tactical Fighter Wing; 831st Air Division
- Conflicts: World War II; Korean War; Vietnam War
- Awards: Distinguished Service Cross; Air Force Distinguished Service Medal (2); Silver Star (2); Legion of Merit (3); Distinguished Flying Cross (6); Bronze Star Medal; Purple Heart; Air Medal (21)

Frederick Corbin "Boots" Blesse (August 22, 1921 – October 31, 2012) was a United States Air Force major general and flying ace. A 1945 graduate of the United States Military Academy, he flew two combat tours in the Korean War, and during the second, in F-86 Sabres, he was credited with shooting down nine MiG-15s and one La-9. When he returned to the United States in October 1952, he was the Air Force's leading jet ace. His fighter tactics manual No Guts, No Glory was used as a basis for fighter combat operations by the Air Force and other air arms for many years. He later flew combat missions in the Vietnam War, commanded the Air Force's first F-111 wing and retired in 1975 at the rank of major general.

== Early life and education ==
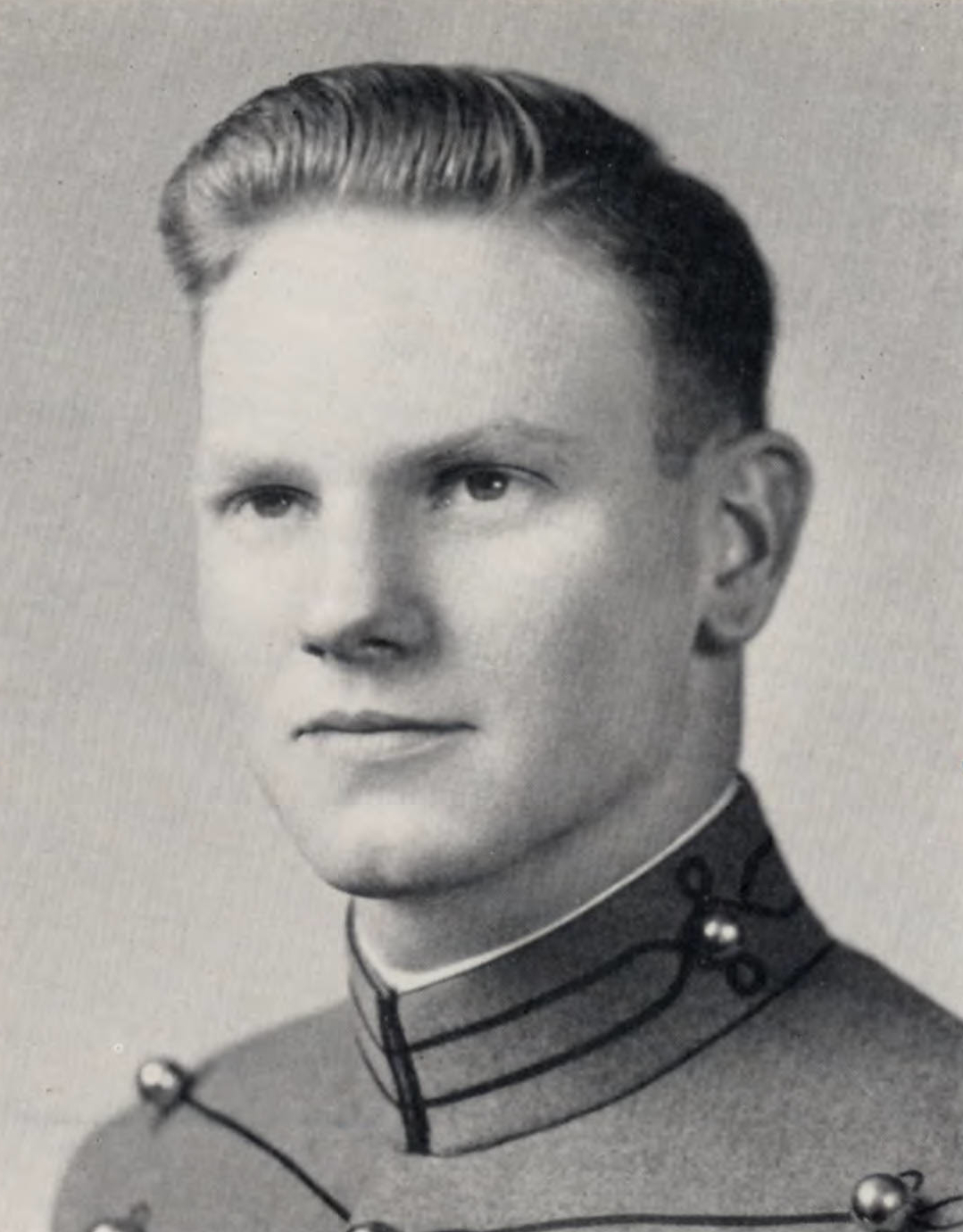
Blesse as a United States Military Academy cadet, c. 1945

Blesse was born on August 22, 1921, in Colón, in the Panama Canal Zone. His father Frederick A. Blesse was a brigadier general in the Medical Corps of the United States Army who retired in 1953. During World War II, his father led the investigation into the incident in which General George S. Patton slapped a soldier whom he had accused of cowardice. According to Blesse, he got his nickname as a child, when he clomped around the house in his father's oversized shoes and his family began saying "here comes Boots again".

Blesse graduated from the American High School in Manila, the Philippines, in April 1939. He graduated from the United States Military Academy at West Point in June 1945, when he was commissioned as a second lieutenant and rated as a pilot in the Army Air Forces.

== Military career ==
=== Early career ===
For the next three years, Blesse was stationed in the United States and then on Okinawa, where he flew the P-40, P-51 and P-47 fighters and the F-80 Shooting Star jet fighter. In March 1949, he went to Selfridge Air Force Base, Michigan, as a jet fighter pilot.

=== Korean War ===
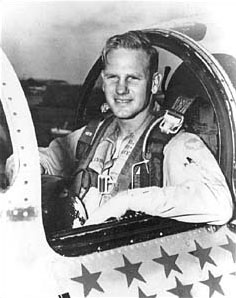
Blesse onboard his F-86 Sabre during the Korean War

Blesse volunteered for two combat tours in the Korean War, the first from November 1950 to May 1951 and the second from April to October 1952. On his first tour, he flew 67 ground-attack missions in the F-51 Mustang and 35 in the F-80. On January 1, 1951, he led a flight through poor weather against an enemy position at Koensong, pressing home his attacks although his aircraft had been damaged by ground fire, and he received the Distinguished Flying Cross for the action.

Between his tours, Blesse was stationed at George Air Force Base in California. He then volunteered for a second tour in the F-86 Sabre, and in the spring of 1952, he became operations officer of the 334th Fighter-Interceptor Squadron of the 4th Fighter-Interceptor Wing at Kimpo Air Base. As operations officer, he changed the squadron's air-to-air tactics and pressed his pilots to seek out MiGs. He shot down his first MiG-15 on May 25, 1952. In September 1952, he scored his fifth victory, becoming the 19th ace of the Korean War.

On September 8, 1952, while leading a flight of four F-86s protecting fighter-bombers, Blesse pursued a MiG into the clouds and shot it down, and he then attacked a second MiG, which he hit repeatedly until its pilot ejected. By his own account, on October 3, 1952, he scored his final victory but was shot down himself and rescued from the water. In all, he flew 223 combat missions in Korea, 121 of them in F-86s, and he was credited with ten aerial victories, nine MiG-15s and one La-9. When he returned to the United States in October 1952, he was the Air Force's leading jet ace, and he was later ranked as the sixth-highest-scoring American ace of the war.

=== Post-Korean war ===
In December 1952, Blesse was assigned to Nellis Air Force Base, Nevada, where he served as a gunnery instructor, squadron operations officer and squadron commander. During this tour, he wrote No Guts, No Glory, a manual on air-to-air combat drawn from his experience in Korea. The book was used from 1955 as a basis for fighter combat operations by the Royal Air Force, the United States Marine Corps, the Chinese Nationalist and South Korean air forces and the U.S. Air Force, and as late as 1973, 3,000 copies were reproduced and sent to tactical units. According to Blesse, the manual grew out of a short handout he prepared for visiting squadrons, and the Air Force kept it classified for about two decades.

Blesse was a member of the Air Training Command fighter gunnery team that won the Air Force's Worldwide Fighter Gunnery Championship in 1954 and 1955. At the 1955 meet, flying an F-86F, he won all six trophies awarded for individual performance, a feat that the Air Force described as never having been equaled.

In February 1956, Blesse was transferred to Randolph Air Force Base, Texas, as chief of the Fighter Division in Crew Training. In July 1958, he was assigned to the 32d Fighter-Interceptor Squadron at Soesterberg Air Base in the Netherlands, where he served as base and squadron commander of a unit flying the F-100 and the F-102. In August 1961, he returned to the United States as a member of the Air Staff with the inspector general at Norton Air Force Base, California. In 1965, he was selected to attend the National War College in Washington, D.C., and during this assignment, he earned a master's degree in international relations from George Washington University.

=== Vietnam War ===
In April 1967, Blesse became director of operations of the 366th Tactical Fighter Wing at Da Nang Air Base in South Vietnam. During this tour, he flew 108 combat missions over North Vietnam and 46 more over Laos and South Vietnam. On July 8, 1967, as aircraft commander of an F-4C Phantom II, he made repeated passes against heavily defended artillery positions that were shelling the allied base at Đông Hà, and he was again awarded the Distinguished Flying Cross. He was also decorated for valor for helping to unload bombs from a burning F-4 during a rocket attack. Blesse pressed for the use of the SUU-16 gun pod on the F-4, which had been designed to rely on missiles, and his advocacy influenced the decision to give later F-4s an internal gun.

=== Later commands ===
In May 1968, Blesse became director of operations of the 474th Tactical Fighter Wing at Nellis Air Force Base, the Air Force's first F-111 wing, and in June 1969, he became its commander. In July 1970, he took command of the 831st Air Division at George Air Force Base. From January to July 1971, he served in South Vietnam at the headquarters of the Seventh Air Force at Tan Son Nhut Air Base, where he was assistant deputy chief of staff for operations.

In September 1971, Blesse became assistant deputy chief of staff for operations at the headquarters of Pacific Air Forces at Hickam Air Force Base, Hawaii, and in March 1972, he became its deputy chief of staff for operations. He was promoted to major general with effect from December 1, 1972. In November 1973, he became the senior Air Force member of the Weapons Systems Evaluation Group in the Office of the Secretary of Defense, and in August 1974, he became deputy inspector general of the Air Force. He retired on April 1, 1975, after almost 30 years of service. He was a command pilot with more than 6,500 flying hours, mostly in fighters, and more than 650 hours of combat flying.

== Later life and death ==
After leaving the Air Force, Blesse worked for the Grumman Corporation. In 1987, he published a memoir, Check Six: A Fighter Pilot Looks Back. In 1985, he was among the first group of aviators honored at the Air Command and Staff College's Gathering of Eagles program. In December 1998, more than 46 years after the action, he was awarded the Distinguished Service Cross for his double victory of September 8, 1952, his highest decoration.

Blesse died on October 31, 2012, in Melbourne, Florida, at the age of 91. He was buried at Arlington National Cemetery on March 22, 2013, near his father, and four F-15E Strike Eagles from the 4th Fighter Wing at Seymour Johnson Air Force Base flew over the burial. The Air Force Chief of Staff Mark Welsh attended the funeral. On June 27, 2014, the 334th Fighter Squadron unveiled a stone memorial to Blesse inscribed with the words "No Guts, No Glory" at its building at Seymour Johnson.

== Personal life ==
Blesse was married to Betty for 31 years. He had four children and three stepchildren.

== Awards and decorations ==
He was a command pilot with more than 6,500 flying hours, most of which were in fighter aircraft including the P-40, P-47, P-51 Mustang, P-80, F-86, F-100, F-102, A-7, F-104, F-106, F-4, and F-111. He had more than 650 hours combat flying and is the nation's sixth ranking jet ace.

USAF Command Pilot Badge
Distinguished Service Cross		Air Force Distinguished Service Medal with bronze oak leaf cluster
Silver Star with bronze oak leaf cluster	Legion of Merit with two bronze oak leaf clusters	Distinguished Flying Cross with Valor device and silver oak leaf cluster
Bronze Star Medal with Valor device	Purple Heart	Air Medal with four silver oak leaf clusters
Air Force Commendation Medal with bronze oak leaf cluster	Army Commendation Medal	Air Force Presidential Unit Citation with bronze oak leaf cluster
Air Force Outstanding Unit Award w/ Valor device and bronze oak leaf cluster	Combat Readiness Medal	American Campaign Medal
Asiatic–Pacific Campaign Medal	World War II Victory Medal	Army of Occupation Medal with 'Japan' clasp
National Defense Service Medal with service star	Korean Service Medal with four bronze campaign stars	Armed Forces Expeditionary Medal
Vietnam Service Medal with four bronze campaign stars	Air Force Longevity Service Award with silver and bronze oak leaf clusters	Small Arms Expert Marksmanship Ribbon
Philippine Independence Medal	National Order of Vietnam; Knight	Republic of Vietnam Gallantry Cross with Palm
Republic of Vietnam Armed Forces Honor Medal; 1st class	Republic of Korea Presidential Unit Citation	Republic of Vietnam Gallantry Cross Unit Citation
United Nations Service Medal for Korea	Vietnam Campaign Medal	Korean War Service Medal

=== Distinguished Service Cross citation ===

Blesse, Frederick C.
Major, U.S. Air Force
334th Fighter-Interceptor Squadron, 4th Fighter-Interceptor Wing, Far East Air Forces
Date of Action: September 8, 1952

Citation:

The President of the United States of America, authorized by Act of Congress, July 9, 1918 (amended by act of July 25, 1963), takes pleasure in presenting the Distinguished Service Cross (Air Force) to Major Frederick Corbin Blesse, United States Air Force, for extraordinary heroism in connection with military operations against an armed enemy of the United Nations while serving as Pilot of an F-86 Fighter Airplane of the 334th Fighter-Interceptor Squadron, 4th Fighter-Interceptor Wing, Far East Air Forces, in action against enemy forces in the Republic of Korea on 8 September 1952. Leading a flight of four F-86s protecting fighter-bombers from possible attack by enemy MIGs, Major Blesse positioned his flight for an attack on four sighted MIGs. Singling out one of the MIGs, Major Blesse followed it up into an overcast and broke out between layers of clouds. As the two aircraft emerged from the clouds, Major Blesse was still in position, so he closed and fired, causing the MIG to burst into flames and the pilot to eject himself. Major Blesse then sighted a lone MIG, and positioned himself for another attack. The MIG began violent, evasive maneuvers, but through superior airmanship Major Blesse scored hits, causing the MIG to snap and spin. Major Blesse followed closely until the MIG recovered. He then scored hits with another long burst which caused the pilot to eject himself. Through his courage, keen flying ability and devotion to duty, Major Blesse reflected great credit upon himself, the Far East Air Forces, and the United States Air Force.

== Works ==
- No Guts, No Glory (1955)
- Check Six: A Fighter Pilot Looks Back (1987)
