= Bradley C. Hosmer =

United States Air Force general

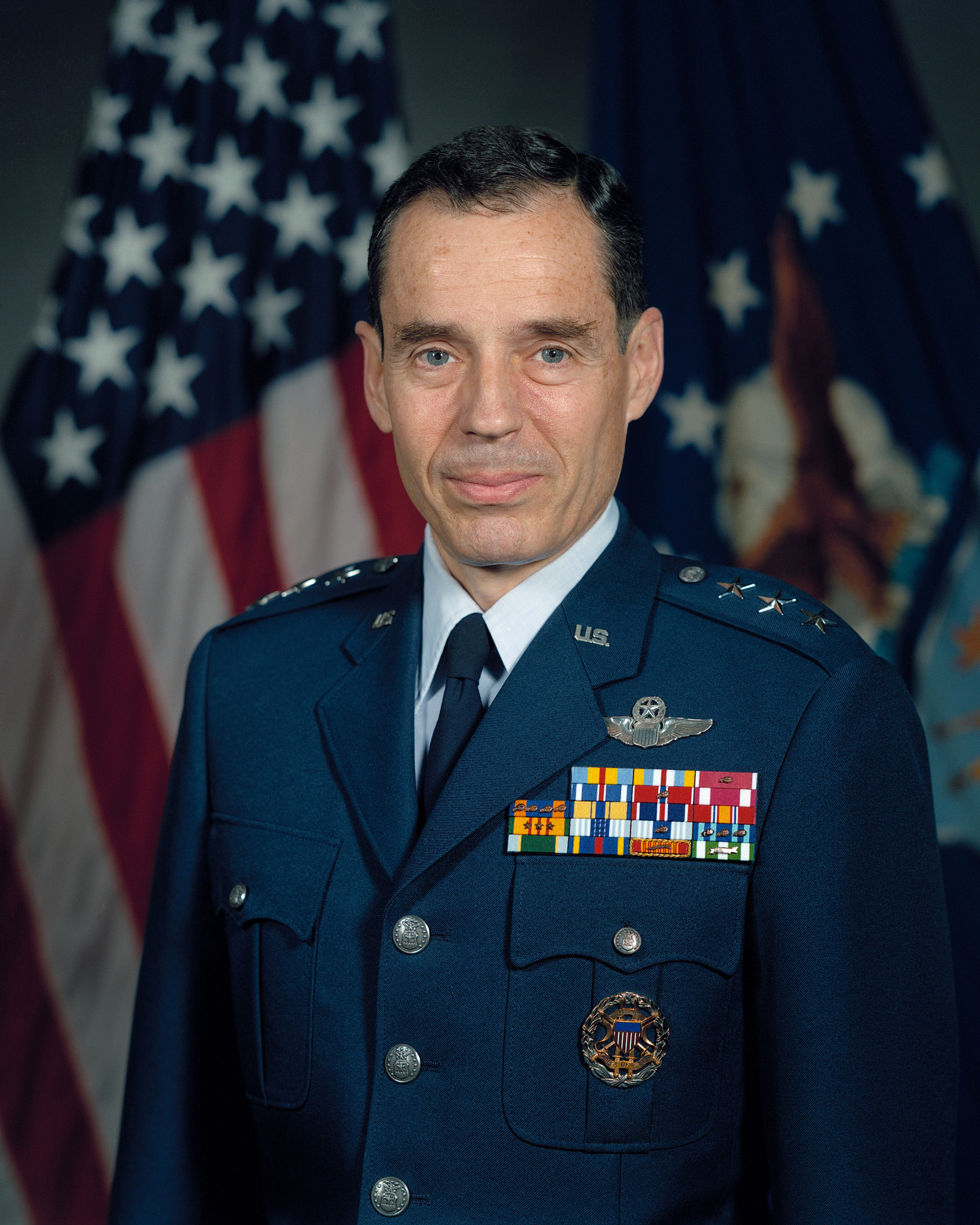
- Lieutenant General Bradley C. Hosmer
- Born: October 8, 1937 (age 89); San Antonio, Texas, U.S.
- Military career
- Allegiance: United States of America
- Branch: United States Air Force
- Service years: 1959-1994
- Rank: Lieutenant General
- Commands: Superintendent, USAF Academy; National Defense University
- Conflicts: Vietnam
- Awards: Defense Distinguished Service Medal; Defense Superior Service Medal; Legion of Merit (2)

Bradley Clark Hosmer (born October 8, 1937) is a retired lieutenant general in the United States Air Force (USAF). He served as the twelfth Superintendent of the United States Air Force Academy in Colorado Springs, Colorado from 1991 to 1994. He was the first Academy graduate to return as superintendent.

== Education and training ==
Hosmer was born in San Antonio, Texas in 1937. He earned his Bachelor of Science degree in 1959 from the United States Air Force Academy, where he was the top graduate of the Academy's first graduating class. He subsequently won a Rhodes Scholarship and earned his master's degree in international relations from Oxford University, England. Hosmer is also a graduate of the USAF Squadron Officer School, the Naval Command and Staff College and the National War College.

== Military assignment history ==
Hosmer served in a variety of staff positions, including vice director of the Joint Staff and Air Force Inspector General. He commanded the 479th Tactical Training Wing, Holloman Air Force Base, New Mexico from 1978 to 1979; the 347th Tactical Fighter Wing, Moody Air Force Base, Georgia from 1979 to 1981; and the 831st Air Division, George Air Force Base, California from 1981 to 1982. From 1986 to 1989, he served as president of the National Defense University, Fort McNair, Washington, D.C. Hosmer was a command pilot with more than 4,000 flying hours, in aircraft to include the T-33 Shooting Star, T-37 Tweet, AT-38 Talon, O-1 Bird Dog, F-4 Phantom II, F-16 Fighting Falcon, F-15 Eagle, F-100 Super Sabre and F-111 Aardvark.

== Awards and decorations ==
His decorations include the Defense Distinguished Service Medal, the Defense Superior Service Medal, the Legion of Merit with oak leaf cluster, the Distinguished Flying Cross, the Bronze Star with oak leaf cluster, the Meritorious Service Medal, the Air Medal with four oak leaf clusters, and the Air Force Commendation Medal.

- Command Pilot Badge
- Office of the Joint Chiefs of Staff Identification Badge
- Defense Distinguished Service Medal
- Defense Superior Service Medal
- Legion of Merit with oak leaf cluster
- Distinguished Flying Cross
- Bronze Star with oak leaf cluster
- Meritorious Service Medal
- Air Medal with four oak leaf clusters
- Air Force Commendation Medal
- Air Force Outstanding Unit Award
- National Defense Service Medal
- Vietnam Service Medal with three bronze service stars
- Air Force Overseas Short Tour Service Ribbon
- Air Force Overseas Long Tour Service Ribbon with oak leaf cluster
- Air Force Longevity Service Award with seven oak leaf clusters
- Marksmanship Ribbon
- Air Force Training Ribbon
- Gallantry Cross (Vietnam) unit citation
- Vietnam Campaign Medal

Military offices
Preceded by Charles R. Hamm	Superintendent of the U.S. Air Force Academy; 1991 – 1994	Succeeded by Paul E. Stein
Preceded by Buford D. Lary	Inspector General of the Air Force; 1989 – 1991	Succeeded by Eugene H. Fischer
