= 34th Fighter Squadron =

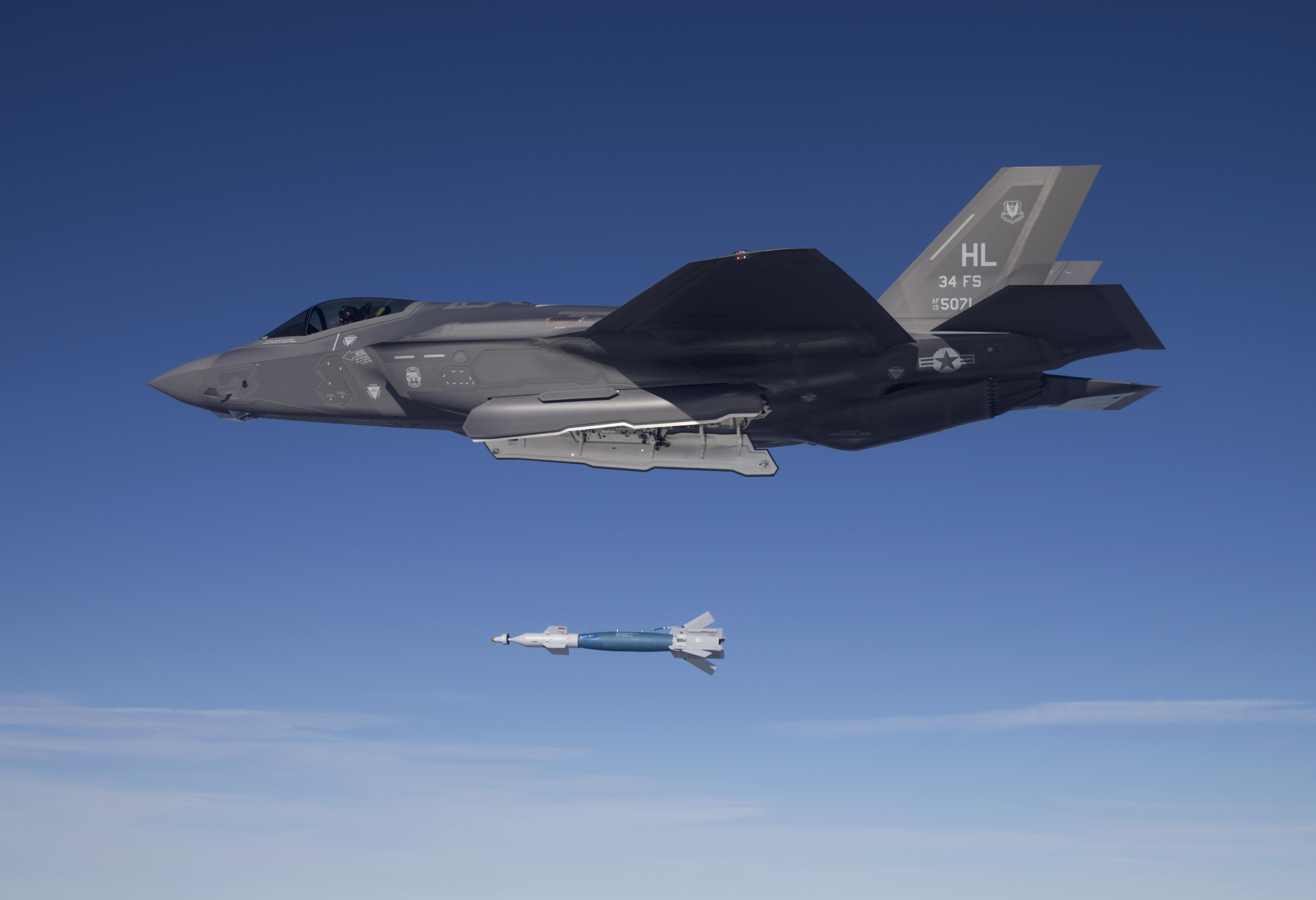
- A 34th Squadron F-35 Lightning II dropping a GBU-12 in February 2016
- Active: 1944–1946; 1954–1959; 1966–2010, 2015–present
- Country: United States
- Branch: United States Air Force
- Role: Fighter
- Part of: Air Combat Command
- Nickname: Rude Rams
- Engagements: Pacific Theater of Operations; Vietnam War
- Decorations: Presidential Unit Citation; Air Force Outstanding Unit Award with Combat "V" Device; Republic of Vietnam Gallantry Cross with Palm

Commanders
- Current commander: Lt Col Matthew R. Johnstonas of 28 June 2017
- Notable commanders: Brig Gen Robinson Risner

Insignia
- 34th Fighter Squadron emblem (Approved 9 November 1945)

The 34th Fighter Squadron is part of the United States Air Force's 388th Fighter Wing at Hill Air Force Base, Utah. On 2 August 2016, the Air Force announced that the 34th had become the first squadron to achieve initial operating capability with the F-35A, the Air Force′s variant of the F-35 Lightning II. With an operational history extending back to World War II, and including the Cold War, Vietnam War, Operation Desert Storm, Operation Southern Watch, Operation Desert Fox, Operation Noble Eagle, and the Afghanistan War, it had most recently operated F-16 Fighting Falcon aircraft on air superiority missions prior to its reactivation as a F-35A squadron.

== Mission ==
Conduct air-to-air and air-to-ground operations for daylight and nighttime missions.

== History ==
=== World War II ===
The 34th Fighter Squadron (34th FS) was activated at Seymour Johnson Field, North Carolina, on 15 October 1944, flying the Republic P-47 Thunderbolt. The squadron served in the final stages of World War II, seeing combat operations in the Western Pacific from May 1945 to August 1946 while it was stationed in the Ryukyu Islands, first on Ie Shima and later on Okinawa.

Following the war, the 34th FS was inactivated on 15 October 1946. It was redesignated the 34th Fighter-Day Squadron prior to its reactivation in November 1954, at George Air Force Base, California. It was part of the 413th Fighter-Day Group and was equipped with the North American F-86 Sabre. The 34th transitioned into the F-100 Super Sabre in 1956, which it flew until 1959, when it was again inactivated.

=== Vietnam War ===
On 2 May 1966, the 34th FS was again activated and assigned to Pacific Air Forces. The squadron was part of the 41st Air Division at Yokota Air Base, Japan. One month later, the 34th deployed and was attached to the 388th Tactical Fighter Wing at Korat Royal Thai Air Force Base, Thailand. The unit was equipped with the Republic F-105 Thunderchief and conducted combat operations until May 1969. While assigned at Korat, the squadron transitioned into the McDonnell F-4 Phantom II and continued combat operations in Southeast Asia.

The Rams participated in Operation Prize Bull on 21 September 1971. This was the first time U.S. forces bombed North Vietnam using all-weather capability. The 34th Tactical Fighter Squadron performed strike missions in support of a recovery operation for the SS Mayagüez, a merchant freighter captured by Cambodian Khmer Rouge guerrillas in May 1975.

=== Return to the United States ===
On 23 December 1975, the 34th, as part of the 388th Tactical Fighter Wing, was relocated to Hill Air Force Base, Utah, still flying the F-4D Phantom II. In November 1979, the 34th TFS became the first fighter squadron to be fully equipped with the General Dynamics F-16 Fighting Falcon. For the next several years, the squadron conducted initial qualification training for pilots from around the world, including those from Belgium, Denmark, the Netherlands, Israel, and Norway.

When Iraq invaded Kuwait in August 1990, the 34th found itself backing up the front-line forces of the 388th Tactical Fighter Wing (Provisional) in Southwest Asia for Operation Desert Storm. The squadron flew its desert missions from Torrejon Air Base, Spain.

After the Gulf War ended in 1991, the 34th deployed in support of Operation Southern Watch. Between 1991 and 1996, the 34th FS deployed to Southwest Asia a total of five times. Several members of the 34th were injured on 25 June 1996 when the Khobar Towers housing compound was attacked.

During December 1998, the 34th flew combat missions as part of Operation Desert Fox, a punitive operation aimed to make Iraq comply with United Nations sanctions. In June 2000, the 34th was the first active duty squadron deployed to Curaçao, Netherlands Antilles in support of Operation Coronet Nighthawk, flying drug interdiction missions in Latin America.

The 34th flew F-16s in combat air patrol sorties in support of Operation Noble Eagle during the 2002 Winter Olympics. In February 2003 the 34th supported Operation Noble Eagle from Langley Air Force Base, Virginia by patrolling the skies over Washington, D.C., during the height of Operation Iraqi Freedom. It flew in support of Operation Noble Eagle again in October 2009 from Hill.

The 34th were deployed to Balad Airbase, Iraq, twice and flew combat air patrols over the skies of Iraq in support of Operation Iraqi Freedom from January to May 2005 and from May to October 2008. It also was deployed to Bagram Air Base, Afghanistan, from January to June 2010 to fly combat air support missions in support of the NATO ISAF in Afghanistan. The 34th was inactivated on 16 July 2010 due to military restructuring designed to save money by retiring aircraft from the active inventory.

The 34th was activated on 17 July 2015 with plans for it to become the first combat squadron of the 388th Fighter Wing (and the first in the U.S. Air Force) to receive the Lockheed Martin F-35A Lightning II. The squadron was not equipped with aircraft immediately, but received its first F-35A on 2 September 2015. On 2 August 2016, the U.S. Air Force declared the 34th FS to be the first Air Force squadron to have reached initial operational capability with the F-35A.

=== Operations ===
- World War II
- Vietnam War
- Operation Southern Watch
- Operation Desert Fox
- Operation Noble Eagle
- Operation Iraqi Freedom
- Operation Enduring Freedom
- Operation Midnight Hammer

== Lineage ==
- Constituted as the 34th Fighter Squadron, Single Engine

Activated on 15 October 1944
Inactivated on 15 October 1946

- Redesignated 34th Fighter-Day Squadron on 26 August 1954

Activated on 11 November 1954

- Redesignated 34th Tactical Fighter Squadron on 1 July 1958

Inactivated on 15 March 1959
Activated on 2 May 1966 (not organized)
Organized on 15 May 1966

- Redesignated 34th Fighter Squadron on 1 November 1991

Inactivated on 16 July 2010
Activated on 17 July 2015

=== Assignments ===
- 413th Fighter Group; 15 October 1944 – 15 October 1946
- 413th Fighter-Day Group: 11 November 1954 (attached to Ninth Air Force 6 June – c. 13 July 1956)
- 413th Fighter-Day Wing (later 413th Tactical Fighter Wing): 8 October 1957 – 15 March 1959
- Pacific Air Forces: 2 May 1966 (not organized)
- 41st Air Division: 15 May 1966 (attached to 388th Tactical Fighter Wing)
- 347th Tactical Fighter Wing: 15 January 1968 (remained attached to 388th Tactical Fighter Wing)
- 388th Tactical Fighter Wing (later 388th Fighter Wing): 15 March 1971
- 388th Operations Group: 1 December 1991 – 16 July 2010
- 388th Operations Group: 17 July 2015

=== Stations ===
- Seymour Johnson Field, North Carolina, 15 October 1944
- Bluethenthal Field, North Carolina, 9 November 1944 – 7 April 1945)
- Ie Shima Airfield, Japan, 19 May 1945
- Kadena Air Base, Okinawa, c. 17 October 1945
- Yontan Airfield, Okinawa, 19 January 1946 – 15 October 1946
- George Air Force Base, California, 11 November 1954 – 15 March 1959

Deployed to

Shaw Air Force Base, South Carolina, 6 June – c. 13 July 1956
Ramey Air Force Base, Puerto Rico, 17 – 22 June 1957)
Luke Air Force Base, Arizona, 13 – 26 July 1958

- Korat Royal Thai Air Force Base, Thailand, 15 May 1966 (operated from Takhli Royal Thai Air Force Base, Thailand 1 – 27 February 1969)
- Hill Air Force Base, Utah, 23 December 1975 – 16 July 2010
- Hill Air Force Base, Utah, 17 July 2015

=== Aircraft ===
- Republic P-47 Thunderbolt (1944–1946)
- North American F-86 Sabre (1954–1956)
- North American F-100 Super Sabre (1956–1959)
- Republic F-105 Thunderchief (1966–1969)
- McDonnell F-4 Phantom II (1969–1975, 1976–1979)
- General Dynamics F-16 Fighting Falcon (1979–2010)
- Lockheed Martin F-35 Lightning II (2015 – present)
