= Circling Raven Golf Club =

Golf course in Idaho, U.S.

- Location in the United States Location in Idaho
- 47.424°N 116.964°W

Club information
- Location: near Worley, Idaho, U.S.
- Elevation: 2,600 feet (790 m)
- Established: 2003; 23 years ago
- Type: Resort / Public
- Owner: Coeur d'Alene Tribe
- Operator: Coeur d'Alene Tribe
- Tota holes: 18
- Greens: Bentgrass
- Fairways: Bluegrass
- Website: www.cdacasino.com/golf/
- Designed by: Gene Bates
- Par: 72
- Length: 7,189 yd (6,574 m)
- Course rating: 74.1
- Slope rating: 144

Circling Raven Golf Club is an 18-hole championship golf course in the northwest United States, located in northern Idaho near Worley. It was rated the third best public course in Idaho by Golf Digest in August 2015.

Owned and operated by the Coeur d'Alene Tribe, Circling Raven opened for play twenty-three years ago in the summer of 2003. It was preceded on the site by a casino (1993) and hotel (2001). The course is named after a visionary chief of the tribe in the 18th century.

Designed by Florida-based architect Gene Bates, the back tees at Circling Raven are at 7,189 yards (6,574 m); the course rating is 74.1 with a slope rating of 144. The terrain varies between rolling prairie, woodlands, and wetlands at an average elevation of approximately 2,600 feet (790 m) above sea level. The course is spread out over more than 600 acres (2.4 km^{2}) and the practice facility covers 25 acres (10 ha).

== Events ==
In September 2005, Circling Raven hosted a team from Royal Dornoch Golf Club in Scotland for a friendly international competition and cultural exchange. The following August, the course was the site of the Pacific Northwest PGA Professional Championship, won by Ryan Malby. The event returned six years later in 2012, and was won by Ryan Benzel, a former Idaho Vandal.

== Location ==
The resort complex is just east of the intersection of U.S. Route 95 and State Highway 58 in southwestern Kootenai County, about three miles (5 km) northwest of Worley and thirty miles (50 km) south of the city of Coeur d'Alene. The southern end of Lake Coeur d'Alene and Heyburn State Park are approximately ten miles (16 km) southeast, as the raven flies. The nearest major airport is Spokane International, about 45 miles (70 km) northwest by vehicle.

== Scorecard ==
Circling Raven Golf Club
Tee	Rating/Slope	1	2	3	4	5	6	7	8	9	Out	10	11	12	13	14	15	16	17	18	In	Total
Par		5	4	3	4	5	4	3	4	4	36	4	4	5	3	4	4	3	5	4	36	72
SI	Men's	7	11	15	1	5	13	17	9	3		14	6	2	12	18	8	16	4	10
Gold	74.1 / 144	513	395	217	406	574	387	212	386	474	3564	336	446	581	253	397	426	192	559	435	3625	7189
Blue	71.3 / 138	493	349	186	380	529	351	185	357	451	3281	321	418	535	218	328	391	176	519	392	3298	6578
White	M:69.6/131 W:75.0/145	483	310	182	360	501	317	154	329	437	3073	298	379	488	200	306	369	162	486	347	3035	6108
Par		5	4	3	4	5	4	3	4	4	36	4	4	5	3	4	4	3	5	4	36	72
SI	Women's	7	13	15	5	1	11	17	9	3		14	6	2	12	18	8	16	4	10
Green	70.4 / 137	466	275	163	268	405	272	149	298	397	2693	269	347	436	145	269	348	137	431	314	2696	5389
Red	66.7 / 121	369	260	142	253	392	219	131	276	359	2401	174	323	391	135	240	267	103	400	274	2307	4708
