= Richard Worsley (disambiguation) =

Sir Richard Worsley (1923–2013) was a British Army general.

Richard Worsley may also refer to:

- Sir Richard Worsley, 1st Baronet (1589–1621), MP
- Sir Richard Worsley, 7th Baronet (1751–1805), English politician and collector of antiquities
- Richard Worsley (16th century MP), in 1539 MP for Hampshire
- Richard Worsley (cricketer), English cricketer and British Army officer

== See also ==
- Richard Worley (disambiguation)
