= List of casinos in Idaho =

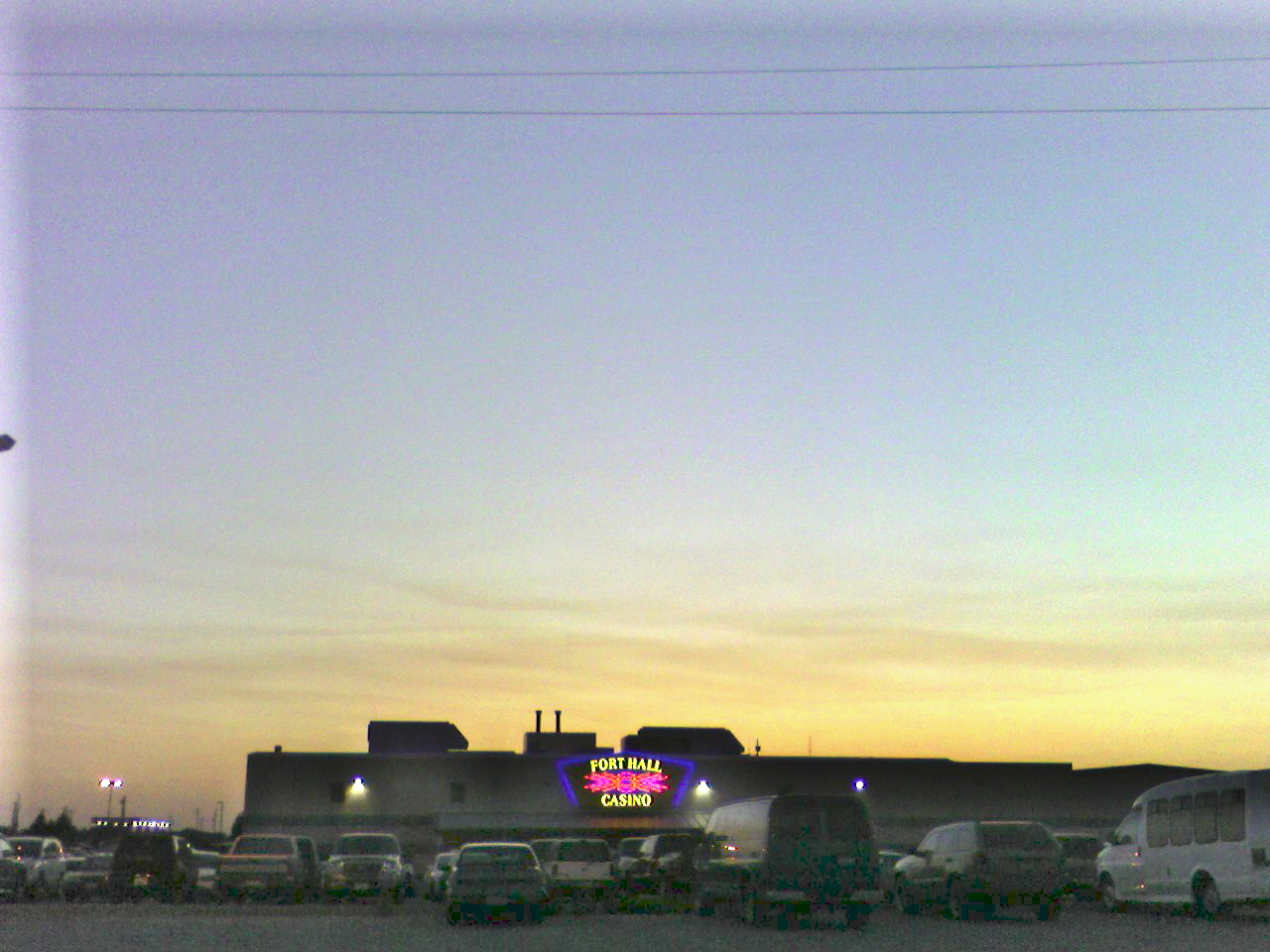
Fort Hall Casino

This is a list of casinos in Idaho.

== List of casinos ==
List of casinos in the U.S. state of Idaho
Casino	City	County	State	District	Type	Comments
Coeur d'Alene Casino	Worley	Kootenai	Idaho		Native American	Coeur d'Alene Tribe
Clearwater Casino	Lewiston	Nez Perce	Idaho		Native American	Nez Perce Tribe
Fort Hall Casino	Fort Hall	Fort Hall	Idaho		Native American	Shoshone-Bannock Tribes
It'se Ye Ye Casino	Kamiah	Lewis	Idaho		Native American	Nez Perce Tribe
Kootenai River Inn and Casino	Bonners Ferry	Boundary	Idaho		Native American	Kootenai Tribe of Idaho

== See also ==
- List of casinos in the United States
- List of casino hotels
