= Washington State Route 278 =

State highway in Spokane County, Washington, US

State Route 278

- SR 278 highlighted in red

Route information
- Auxiliary route of SR 27
- Maintained by WSDOT
- Length: 5.50 mi (8.85 km)
- Existed: 1991–present
- Tourist routes: Palouse Scenic Byway

Major junctions
- West end: SR 27 in Rockford
- East end: SH-58 at Idaho state line near Rockford

Location
- Country: United States
- State: Washington
- Counties: Spokane

Highway system
- State highways in Washington; Interstate; US; State; Scenic; Pre-1964; 1964 renumbering; Former
← SR 274	→ SR 281

State Route 278 (SR 278) is a 5.50-mile (8.85 km) long state highway serving rural Spokane County in the U.S. state of Washington. The highway begins at SR 27 in Rockford and travels east to the Idaho state line, where it becomes Idaho State Highway 58. SR 278 was established in 1991 to serve the Coeur d'Alene Reservation in Idaho and used the route of an old gravel road that dates back to the 1930s.

== Route description ==
SR 278 begins as Emma Street in Rockford at an intersection with Railroad Street, signed as SR 28. The highway enters the town parallel to a Union Pacific rail line and crosses over Rock Creek to an intersection with 1st Street. SR 278 turns south onto 1st Street and leaves Rockford, crossing over Rock Creek and beginning to parallel it east as Hoxie Road to the Idaho state line, where the roadway becomes Idaho State Highway 58, continuing 2.943 miles (4.736 km) to U.S. Route 95 (US-95).

Every year the Washington State Department of Transportation (WSDOT) conducts a series of surveys on its highways in the state to measure traffic volume. This is expressed in terms of annual average daily traffic (AADT), which is a measure of traffic volume for any average day of the year. In 2011, WSDOT calculated that between 3,100 and 4,100 vehicles per day used the highway, mostly in Rockford.

== History ==
The route of SR 278 was previously Hoxie Road, which was graveled in 1938 and later paved by the 1950s. Hoxie Road was signed as SR 278 in 1991, and no further major revisions have occurred.

== Major intersections ==
The entire highway is in Spokane County.

Location	mi	km	Destinations	Notes
Rockford	0.00	0.00	SR 27 (Railroad Avenue) – Pullman, Spokane	Western terminus
	5.50	8.85	SH-58 east to US 95 – Coeur d'Alene Reservation	Eastern terminus; Idaho state border
1.000 mi = 1.609 km; 1.000 km = 0.621 mi
