= Paul E. Stein =

United States Air Force general

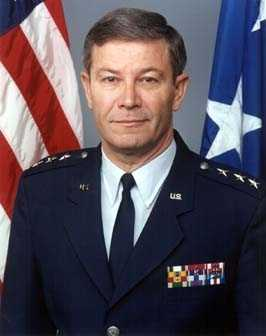
- Lieutenant General Paul E. Stein
- Born: August 30, 1944; Monroe, Louisiana, U.S.
- Died: January 10, 2002 (aged 57); Basye, Virginia, U.S.
- Military career
- Allegiance: United States of America
- Branch: United States Air Force
- Service years: 1966–1997
- Rank: Lieutenant General
- Commands: Superintendent, U.S. Air Force Academy
- Awards: Legion of Merit

Lieutenant General Paul Eugene Stein (August 30, 1944 – January 10, 2002) was the thirteenth Superintendent of the United States Air Force Academy.

== Education ==
Stein was born in 1944 in Monroe, Louisiana. He graduated from Eastern High School in Lansing, Michigan.

He was the starting quarterback for the Air Force Falcons football team and graduated from the United States Air Force Academy with a B.S. degree in political science in 1966. Following graduation, Stein remained at the academy to begin his career as an assistant coach for the Falcons.

In addition to the Air Force Academy's education, Stein also earned an M.A. degree in business administration from Florida State University in 1973 and graduated from the Air Command and Staff College in 1979, a national security management course in 1981, the Air War College in 1986 and the Program for Senior Executives in National and International Security at Harvard University in 1993.

== Military career ==
Stein has served in a variety of staff positions, including deputy chief of staff for personnel, chief of staff of Tactical Air Command and commander, Keesler Technical Training Center, Keesler Air Force Base, Mississippi. Before assuming his duties as Superintendent of the Air Force Academy, he was the Air Force director of legislative liaison in Washington, D.C.

Roughly six years after his retirement, and one year after his death, General Stein's tenure as Superintendent was scrutinized in light of the Air Force Academy sexual assault scandal. Stein's actions and leadership of the academy were reviewed closely in the Fowler Report, the Air Force Working Group Report, and the Report of the Defense Task Force on Sexual Harassment & Violence at the Military Service Academies.

General Stein retired from active duty on September 1, 1997. He died on January 10, 2002, from amyotrophic lateral sclerosis.

== Awards and decorations ==
- Air Force Distinguished Service Medal
- Legion of Merit with one oak leaf cluster.
- Meritorious Service Medal with two oak leaf clusters.
- Air Force Commendation Medal with one oak leaf cluster.
- National Defense Service Medal with service star.

Preceded by Bradley C. Hosmer	Superintendent of the U.S. Air Force Academy; 1994—1997	Succeeded by Tad J. Oelstrom
