= 831st Air Division =

US Air Force fighter plane unit of 100+ aircraft

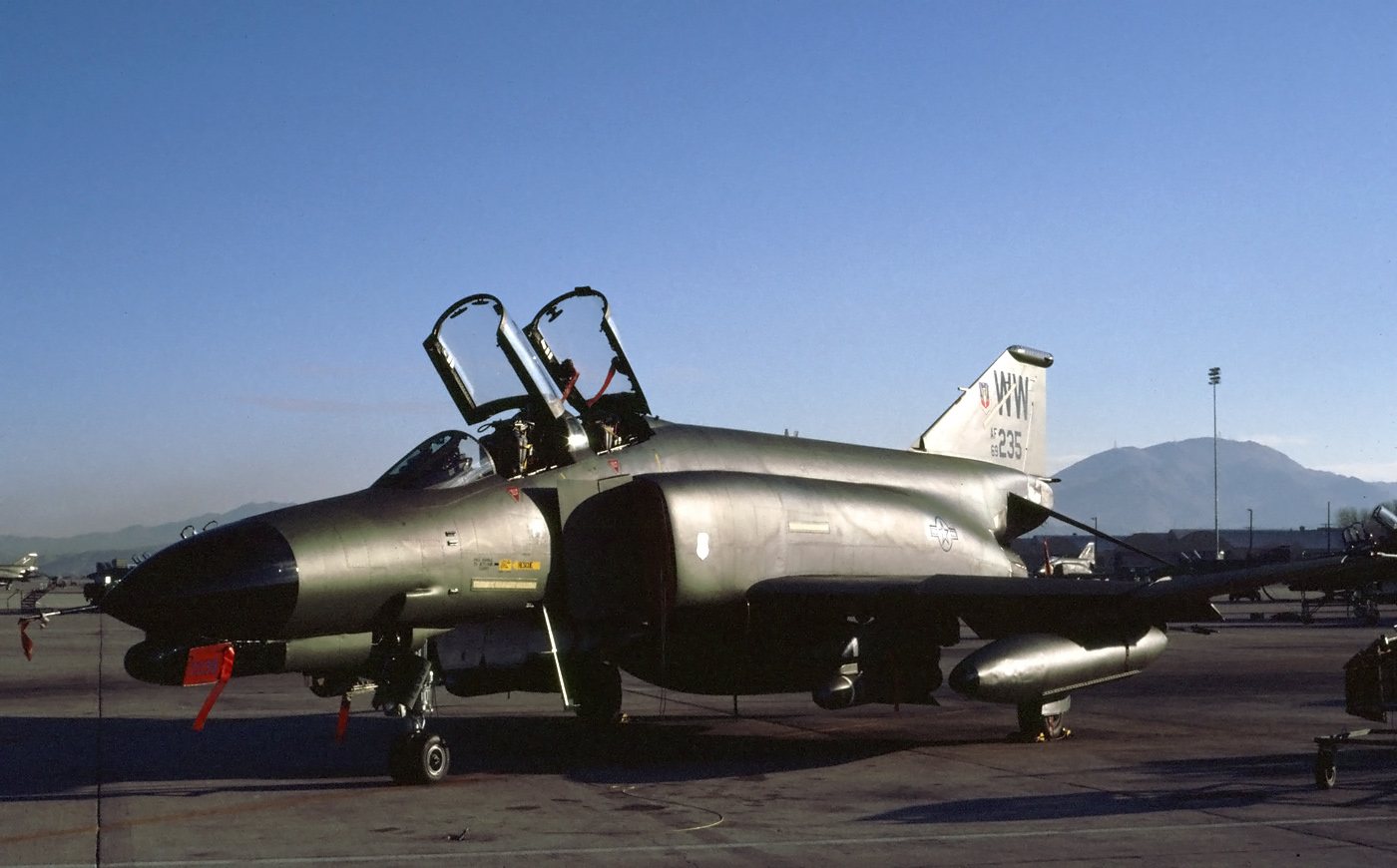
- Wild Weasel F-4 Phantom at George AFB in 1987
- Active: 1957–1971; 1980–1991
- Country: United States
- Branch: United States Air Force
- Role: Command of tactical fighter forces
- Decorations: Air Force Outstanding Unit Award

Commanders
- Notable commanders: Lt Gen Bradley C. Hosmer; Lt Gen Richard C. Bethurem; Maj Gen Robert F. Worley; Maj Gen William E. Bryan Jr.

Insignia
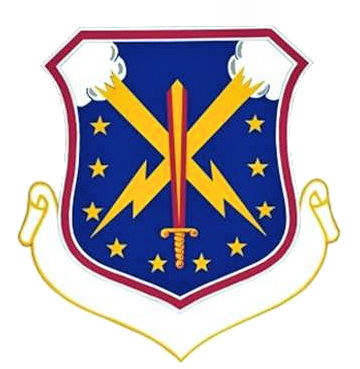
- 831st Air Division emblem (Note: Approved 11 March 1958. Description: Azure, issuing from dexter and sinister chief two clouds proper emitting two lightning flashes saltirewise or surmounted in pale by a sword of the like [color], blade triparted gules, of the third [color mentioned], and of the fourth [color mentioned], between in orle ten mullets, three to dexter, three to sinister and four in base gold; all within a diminished border argent voided of the fourth.)

The 831st Air Division is an inactive United States Air Force organization. Its last assignment was with Tactical Air Command, assigned to Twelfth Air Force at George Air Force Base, California, where it was inactivated on 31 March 1991.

The division was first activated in October 1957 to command the two North American F-100 Super Sabre wings stationed at George and to provide support for them through its 831st Air Base Group. In 1958, one of its wings converted to the Lockheed F-104 Starfighter, While its second wing continued to fly the "Hun" until moving in 1962, when it was replaced by a Republic F-105 Thunderchief wing.

During and after the Cuban Missile Crisis, the division deployed F-104s to Florida to augment the air defense forces there. As United States forces in Southeast Asia grew in size the division's F-105s deployed to support combat operations, with its entire F-105 wing moving in 1964. That year, a wing of McDonnell F-4 Phantom IIs was organized under the division, although a year later the F-4 wing moved to Thailand, leaving two of its squadrons behind.

After 1966, when the division added the 67th Tactical Reconnaissance Wing at Mountain Home Air Force Base, Idaho, the primary mission of the division's wings was training replacement fighter and reconnaissance aircrews, primarily for Southeast Asia operations. During the Pueblo Crisis of 1968, the division gained control of a federalized Air National Guard reconnaissance wing for eighteen months. The division inactivated in 1971 and its two wings were transferred directly to Twelfth Air Force.

The division was activated again at George in 1980, replacing Tactical Training, George, which had been the headquarters for George's training operations. A few months after the division's activation, F-4 training operations were split, with one wing using F-4Es to train United States and foreign fighter aircrews and the other flying F-4Gs to train Wild Weasel crews. In early 1989, Secretary of Defense Frank Carlucci announced that George would be closing. Training operations were consolidated into a single wing and the division was inactivated in 1991 as operations at George were reduced.

== History ==
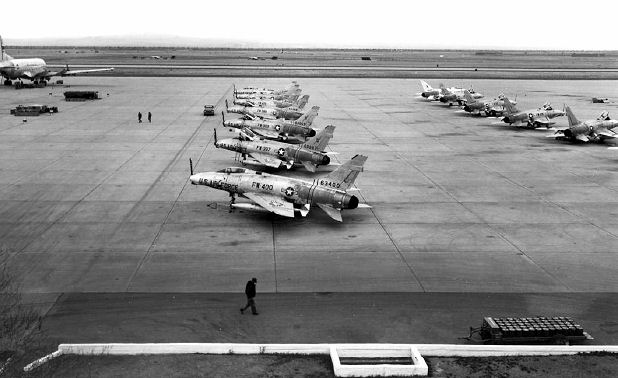
F-100s on the ramp at George AFB

=== F-100 era ===
The 831st Air Division was activated at George Air Force Base, California in October 1957 and assigned to Eighteenth Air Force, when the 413th Fighter-Day Wing was activated as Tactical Air Command (TAC)'s second tactical fighter wing there. The 413th joined the 479th Fighter-Day Wing, which had been at George since 1952. (Note: The 413th Wing's 413th Fighter-Day Group had been stationed at George since November 1954. Maurer Combat Units, pp. 297–298.) The division drew its initial cadre from the headquarters of the 479th Wing and Col George Laven Jr., the 479th's commander, became the first commander of the division. The two wings, which flew the North American F-100 Super Sabre, became the division's initial tactical components, while the 831st Air Base Group was assigned to the division to manage support activities at George. Three months after its activation, the division was reassigned to Twelfth Air Force, which moved without personnel or equipment from Germany to replace Eighteenth Air Force. Late in 1958, when Foster Air Force Base, Texas was shutting down operations, the 450th Tactical Fighter Wing was briefly attached to the 831st.

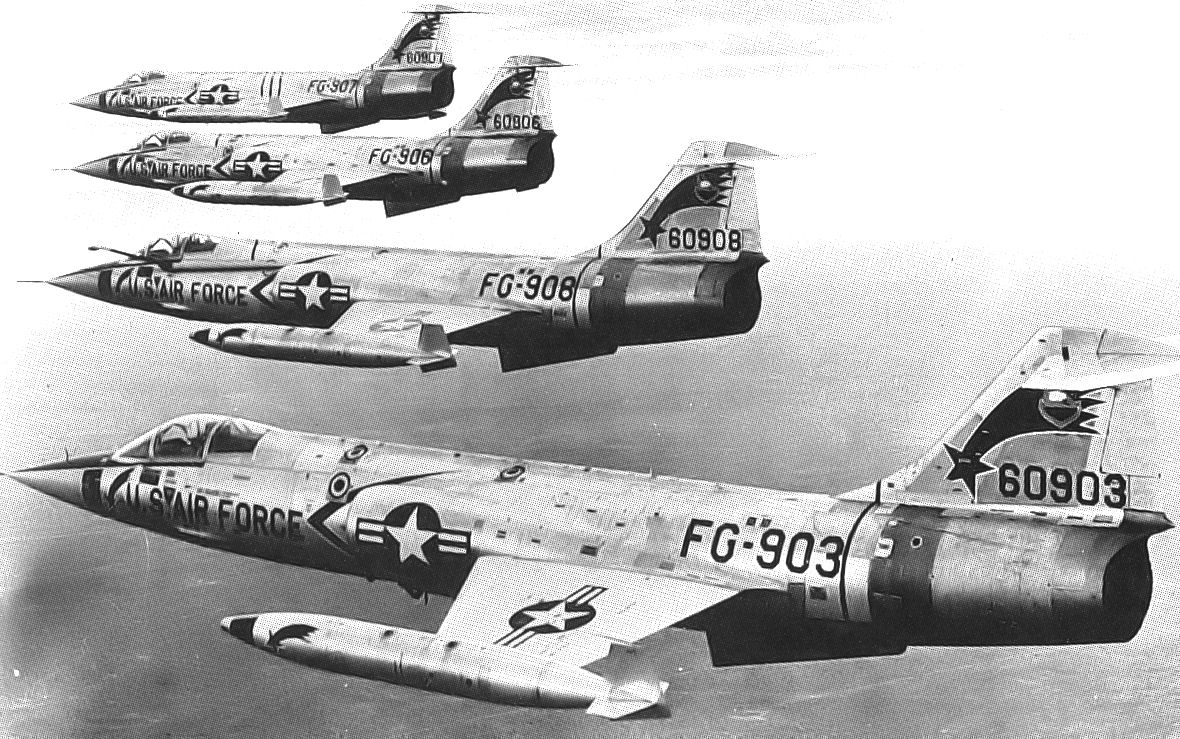
F-104s of the 479th Tactical Fighter Wing (Note: Aircraft are Lockheed F-104C-5-LO Starfighters from George AFB, California. Taken in 1960.)

Although the 413th continued to fly the F-100 until it was inactivated, in October 1958 the 479th Wing began to convert to the Vulcan cannon armed Lockheed F-104 Starfighter. A few months later, in March 1959, the 413th Wing and its components were inactivated and its mission, personnel and aircraft transferred to the 31st Tactical Fighter Wing, which moved to George from Turner Air Force Base, Georgia without personnel or equipment, when TAC transferred Turner to Strategic Air Command. The 31st Wing moved to Homestead Air Force Base, Florida at the end of May 1962 and was reassigned, ending the Super Sabre era at George.

=== Deployments and contingencies ===
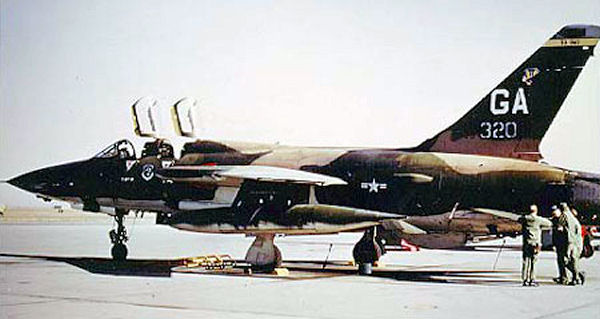
F-105 at George AFB (Note: Aircraft is Republic F-105F-1-RE Thunderchief, serial 63-8320. It was converted to EF-105F (later F-105G) in 1970. In 1980, it was flown to Wright-Patterson AFB for display at the National Museum of the United States Air Force. Baugher, Joe (26 July 2023). "1963 USAF Serial Numbers". Joe Baugher..)

The 831st's time with only a single wing assigned was brief, however, for in July 1962 the 355th Tactical Fighter Wing was organized under the 831st at George and began to equip with the Republic F-105 Thunderchief. The 354th Tactical Fighter Squadron had been activated in April to begin F-105 operations and was transferred from the division to the 355th Wing when the wing was activated. After becoming combat ready with the Thunderchief, the wing began deploying its squadrons to Southeast Asia. The wing itself moved to McConnell Air Force Base, Kansas in December 1964, although most of its fighters had been operating from bases in Thailand and Viet Nam since early 1964.

During the Cuban Missile Crisis, the division deployed a squadron of F-104s to Key West Naval Air Station to augment Navy interceptors there. Following the removal of Soviet missiles from Cuba, Air Defense Command (ADC) still maintained a squadron of F-104As at Homestead Air Force Base, Florida, primarily to defend against the possibility of Cuban fighter aircraft striking across the Straits of Florida. However, the F-104A was armed only with AIM-9 Sidewinders, which were not effective against fighters, so the Air Force decided to modify these interceptors by adding cannon armament. From February through April 1964, eight of the division's cannon-armed F-104s were dispatched to Homestead to stand alert there while ADC's Starfighters were being modified.

In 1964, the Air Force implemented Project Clearwater, which withdrew Convair F-102 Delta Daggers from overseas, primarily to reduce military spending abroad, which was causing negative trade balances. (Note: The term current at the time for negative balances of trade was "gold flow". McMullen, p. 60.) Although the returning planes were distributed throughout ADC, three interceptor squadrons and the 8th Tactical Fighter Wing were transferred to George on paper to make up a new McDonnell F-4 Phantom II wing. Because Phantoms were available before the 8th Wing could be transferred from Itazuke Air Base in July, TAC activated the 32d Tactical Fighter Wing to manage the initial work up with F-4s. When the 8th arrived, the 32d's aircraft and personnel were transferred to it along with the former F-102 squadrons, while the 32d inactivated.

Division F-104s deployed to the Pacific in 1965 to provide air defense of the Taiwan Straits and the northern provinces of South Viet Nam.

The 8th Wing moved to Ubon Royal Thai Air Force Base in December 1965, briefly leaving the 831st with command of a single wing on a single base. However, in April 1966 the 67th Tactical Reconnaissance Wing at Mountain Home Air Force Base was assigned to the division. Until it was inactivated in 1971, the 831st would command wings at two bases. Not all Phantoms left George with the 8th Wing's departure, for the 479th added two squadrons to train crews on the F-4 Phantom.

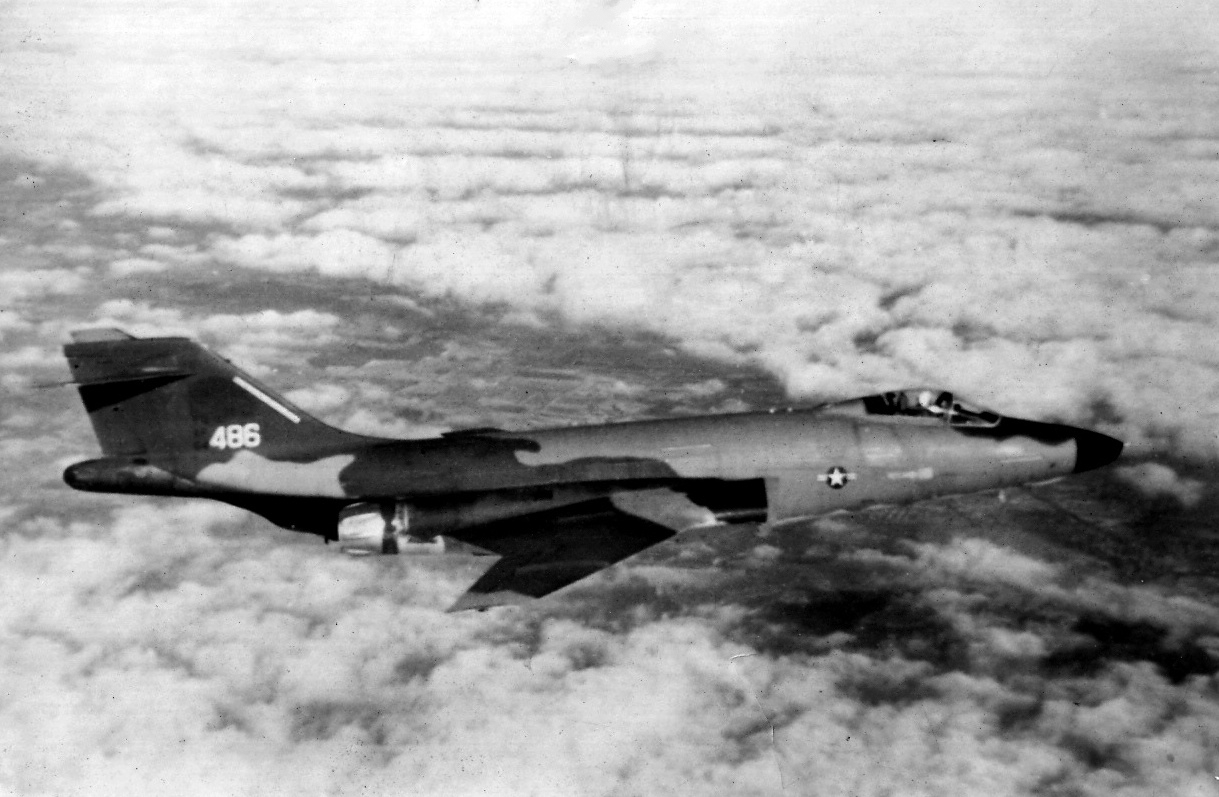
123d Tactical Reconnaissance Wing RF-101 over Asia c. 1968 (Note: Aircraft is McDonnell F-101C-40-MC Voodoo serial 54-1486. It was modified as an RF-101H and assigned to the 165th Tactical Reconnaissance Squadron. It was transferred to the Military Aircraft Storage and Disposition Center on 14 August 1972 and transferred to Naval Air Weapons Station China Lake for use as a target. Baugher, Joe (24 July 2023). "1954 USAF Serial Numbers". Joe Baugher..)

During the Pueblo Crisis, the division's reconnaissance capability was increased when the 123d Tactical Reconnaissance Wing of the Kentucky Air National Guard was called to active duty and moved to Richards-Gebaur Air Force Base, Missouri along with three National Guard reconnaissance squadrons flying the McDonnell RF-101 Voodoo. The 123d continued on active duty until July 1969, when it returned to its home station at Standiford Field.

=== Fighter and reconnaissance training ===
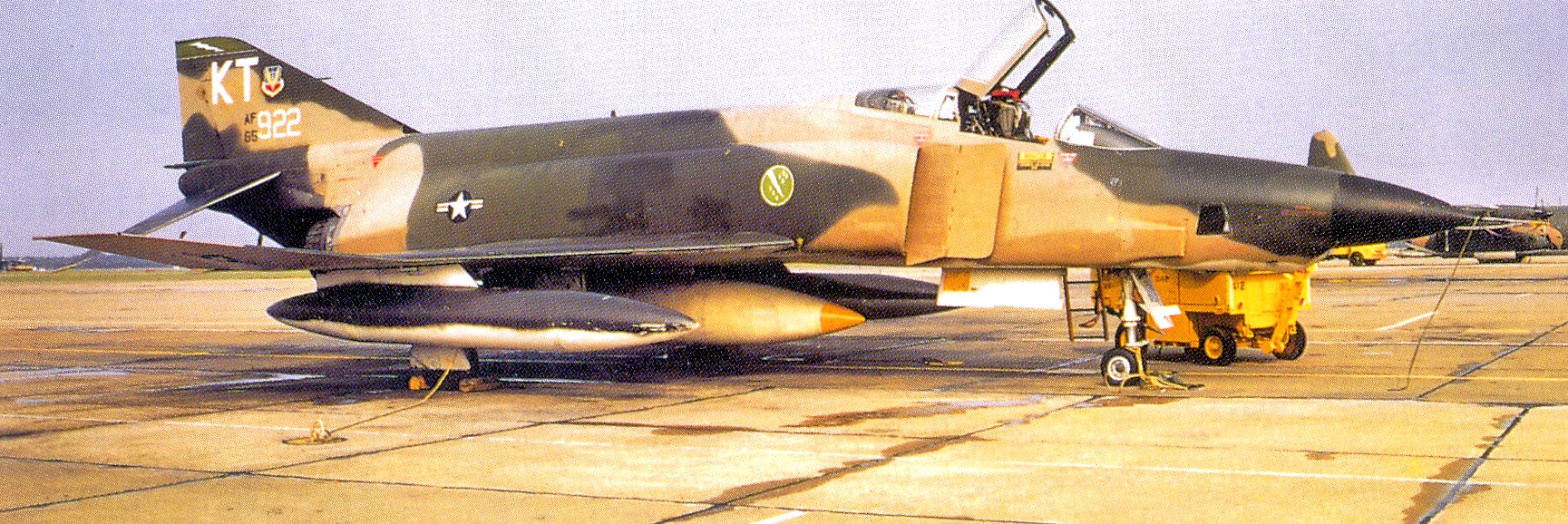
RF-4C of the 67th Tac Recce Wing (Note: Aircraft is McDonnell RF-4C-27-MC Phantom II serial 65-0922. It was transferred to the Air National Guard by 1987 and to the Aerospace Maintenance and Regeneration Center on 11 May 1993, where it was scrapped on 10 March 2014. Baugher, Joe (9 February 2023). "1965 USAF Serial Numbers". Joe Baugher. Photo taken in 1970.)

In addition to participating in deployments with the Starfighter, as soon as it was activated the division's 479th Wing began training foreign air forces on the export versions of the fighter.

The 831st became the active duty advisor for training two airlift wings of the Air Force Reserve early in 1965. The 349th Troop Carrier Wing was at Hamilton Air Force Base and the 452d Troop Carrier Wing was at March Air Force Base, both in California, far from the nearest TAC airlift wing, which was located in west Texas. (Note: The 516th Troop Carrier Wing was stationed at Dyess Air Force Base. Mueller, p. 121.)

When the 8th Wing moved to Ubon at the end of 1965, not all Phantoms left George with the 8th Wing's departure, for the 479th added two squadrons to train crews on the F-4 Phantom. These squadrons were initially assigned to the division and attached to the 479th, but in 1968 they were assigned directly to the wing. Three months after the 479th added the two squadrons it began to operate a formal F-4 Replacement Training Unit, winding down its F-104 operations by July 1967. Shortly after its assignment to the 831st, the 67th Wing at Mountain Home assumed the mission of training RF-4 aircrews.

In 1969 the 479th Wing once again began to train airmen from foreign nations, this time training aircrew and maintenance personnel on the Phantom, continuing the training through 1971 when the division was inactivated and its wings were reassigned directly to Twelfth Air Force.

=== Reactivation ===
The division was reactivated in 1980 when it absorbed the mission, personnel and equipment of Tactical Training, George and was assigned the 35th and 37th Tactical Fighter Wings. (Note: The 35th Wing was split four months after the division activated, with Wild Weasel operations being transferred to the newly-activated 37th Wing. "Abstract (Unclassified), Volume 1, History 831 Air Division Jan–Mar 1981 (Secret)". Air Force History Index..) In addition to maintaining a capability to deploy worldwide, it trained fighter and Wild Weasel aircrews. Wild Weasel aircraft were used to destroy enemy-controlled surface-to-air missiles The Wild Weasel aircraft were initially specially modified F-105s. but the division switched to F-4Gs in 1981. Fighter training was performed with F-4Es and included training for German Air Force crews.

In 1985, Detachment 1 (Air Warrior) of the division was activated to act as the liaison with the Commander of the National Training Center at Fort Irwin, California. The detachment planned, coordinated and controlled close air support for exercises in the Mojave Desert involving all the Army's combat arms. In July, responsibility for Air Warrior was transferred to the division's 35th Tactical Fighter Wing. Air Warrior exercises continued, with aircraft from various TAC wings staging from George for the exercises. (Note: For example, in 1989 TAC units flying from George AFB participated in fourteen Air Warrior exercises. Abstract, TAC 1989 History.)

In early 1989, Secretary of Defense Frank Carlucci announced that George Air Force Base was being considered for closure. In October, the 37th Wing shut down its operations at George and both fighter and Wild Weasel training were again consolidated under the 35th Wing. However, closure plans were put on hold in August 1990, when the division deployed personnel and aircraft from the 35th Wing to Southwest Asia in support of Desert Shield and later, Desert Storm. The 831st was inactivated in March 1991 and its remaining responsibilities at George were transferred to the 35th Wing until George closed the following year.

== Lineage ==
- Established as the 831 Air Division on 26 September 1957

Activated on 8 October 1957
Inactivated on 20 April 1971

- Activated on 1 December 1980

Inactivated on 31 March 1991

=== Assignments ===
- Eighteenth Air Force, 8 October 1957
- Twelfth Air Force, 1 January 1958 – 20 April 1971
- Twelfth Air Force, 1 December 1980 – 31 March 1991

=== Stations ===
- George Air Force Base, California, 8 October 1957 – 20 April 1971
- George Air Force Base, California, 1 December 1980 – 31 March 1991

=== Components ===
==== Wings ====
- 8th Tactical Fighter Wing: 10 July 1964 – 8 December 1965
- 31st Tactical Fighter Wing: 15 March 1959 – 1 June 1962
- 32d Tactical Fighter Wing: 1 April – 25 July 1964
- 35th Tactical Fighter Wing (later 35th Tactical Training Wing, 35 Tactical Fighter Wing): 1 December 1980 – 31 March 1991
- 37th Tactical Fighter Wing: 30 March 1981 – 5 October 1989
- 67th Tactical Reconnaissance Wing: 15 April 1966 – 20 April 1971

Mountain Home Air Force Base, Idaho

- 123d Tactical Reconnaissance Wing: 26 January 1968 – 9 June 1969

Richards-Gebaur Air Force Base, Missouri

- 355th Tactical Fighter Wing: 8 July 1962 – 21 July 1964
- 413th Fighter-Day Wing (later 413 Tactical Fighter Wing): 8 October 1957 – 15 March 1962
- 450th Tactical Fighter Wing: attached 28 August – 4 September 1958

Foster Air Force Base, Texas

- 479th Fighter-Day Wing (later 479 Tactical Fighter Wing): 8 October 1957 – 20 April 1971

==== Groups ====
- 831st Air Base Group (later 831st Combat Support Group): 8 October 1957 – 8 June 1969, 1 December 1980 – 31 March 1991
- 831st Medical Group: (see USAF Hospital, George)

==== Squadrons ====
- 68th Tactical Fighter Squadron: 6 December 1965 – 15 May 1968 (attached to 479th Tactical Fighter Wing)
- 354th Tactical Fighter Squadron: 25 April – 8 July 1962
- 431st Tactical Fighter Squadron: 6 December 1965 – 15 June 1968 (attached to 479th Tactical Fighter Wing)
- 497th Tactical Fighter Squadron: 6 – 8 December 1965 (not operational, attached to 479th Tactical Fighter Wing)
- 2067th Communications Squadron, 1 October 1990 – 31 March 1991

==== Other ====
- 831st Tactical Hospital: 25 January 1959 – 1 July 1969
- 4452d USAF Hospital: 8 October 1957 – 25 January 1959
- USAF Hospital, George (later 831st Medical Group): 1 December 1980 – 31 March 1991
- USAF Advanced Flying School: 1 July 1962 – 1 January 1963 (Note: The schools were "named functions," rather than units. Although they acted as units, they were manned by personnel assigned to the division. See Tactical Air Command Special Order G-2 4 January 1965 (discontinuing the school))
- USAF Combat Crew Training School (Tactical Fighter): 1 January 1963 – 8 January 1965
- Detachment 1, 831st Air Division (Air Warrior): 1 January 1985 – 29 July 1985

=== Aircraft ===
- North American F-100 Super Sabre, 1957–1962
- Lockheed F-104 Starfighter, 1958–1967
- Republic F-105 Thunderchief, 1962–1964, 1980–1981
- McDonnell F-4 Phantom II, 1964–1971, 1980–1991
- McDonnell RF-4 Phantom II, 1966–1971
- McDonnell RF-101 Voodoo, 1968–1969

=== Commanders ===
- Col George Laven Jr., 8 October 1957
- Brig Gen Avelin P. Tacon, Jr., c. 30 December 1958
- Brig Gen John A. Dunning, by 8 June 1960
- Col Richard C. Banbury, by March 1962
- Brig Gen William D. Dunham, c. 6 July 1962
- Brig Gen Robert F. Worley, by September 1963
- Brig Gen James D. Kemp, December 1964
- Brig Gen William E. Bryan Jr., c. February 1966
- Brig Gen Cleo M. Bishop, 14 October 1967
- Col Darrell S. Cramer, 28 June 1968
- Col Carmel M. Shook, 9 June 1969
- Brig Gen Frederick C. Blesse, 30 June 1970
- Col Earl J. Archer Jr., 11 January – 20 April 1971
- Brig Gen Richard L. Meyer, 1 December 1980
- Brig Gen Bradley C. Hosmer, 6 August 1981
- Brig Gen Luther E. "Gene" Thweatt, 10 August 1982
- Brig Gen Richard E. Carr, 29 June 1984
- Brig Gen Malcolm B. Armstrong, 19 December 1985
- Brig Gen Larry L. Henry, 18 May 1988
- Brig Gen Richard C. Bethurem, 11 January 1990 – 31 March 1991

=== Awards and campaigns ===
Award streamer	Award	Dates	Notes
	Air Force Outstanding Unit Award	1 January 1988 – 15 June 1989	

== See also ==
- List of United States Air Force air divisions
- List of F-100 units of the United States Air Force
- List of F-104 Starfighter operators
- List of F-105 units of the United States Air Force
- List of F-4 Phantom II operators
