= Rockford, Washington =

- Town
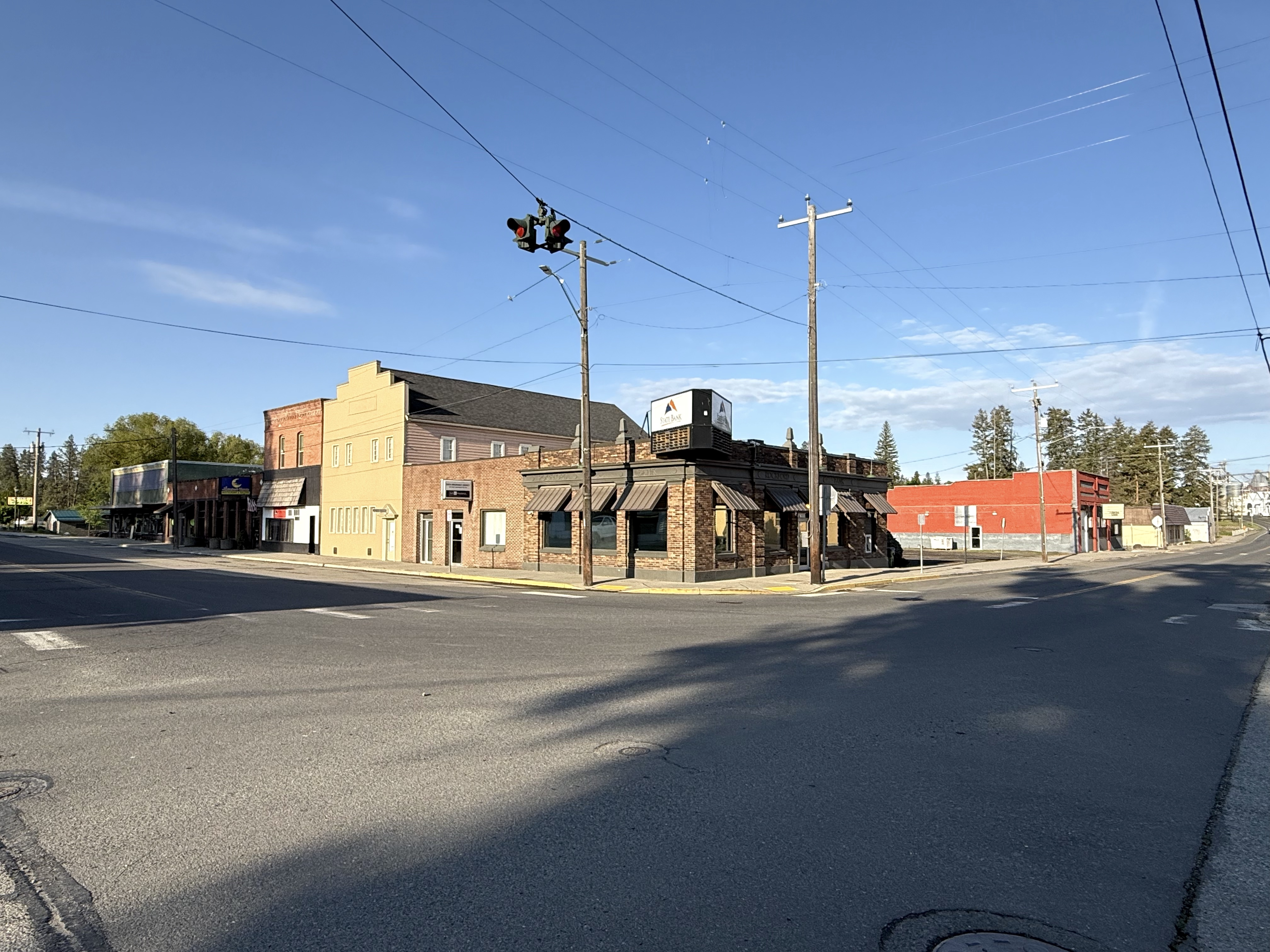
- Businesses in Rockford

- Location of Rockford, Washington
- Coordinates: 47°27′04″N 117°07′38″W
- Country: United States
- State: Washington
- County: Spokane

Area
  - Total: 0.66 sq mi (1.72 km^{2})
  - Land: 0.66 sq mi (1.72 km^{2})
  - Water: 0 sq mi (0.00 km^{2})
- Elevation: 2,438 ft (743 m)

Population (2020)
  - Total: 522
  - Density: 786/sq mi (303/km^{2})
- Time zone: UTC-8 (Pacific (PST))
  - Summer (DST): UTC-7 (PDT)
- ZIP code: 99030
- Area code: 509
- FIPS code: 53-59145
- GNIS feature ID: 2412562
- Website: rockfordwa.com

Rockford is a town in Spokane County, Washington, United States. The population was 522 at the 2020 census.

== History ==
Rockford was first settled in 1878 by D.C. Farnsworth. The town took its name from a rocky ford on Rock Creek. A post office was established in 1880. The Oregon Railroad and Navigation Company brought the railroad to Rockford in 1889, and Rockford was incorporated as a town a year later in 1890.

== Geography ==
According to the United States Census Bureau, the town has a total area of 0.68 square miles (1.76 km^{2}), all of it land.

Rockford is located in southeastern Spokane County in the rolling agricultural region of the Palouse. It is located in a valley where Mica Creek flows into Rock Creek. Mica Creek flows from the north while Rock Creek flows from the southeast, the latter of which turns to a northwesterly direction in the town. The surrounding plateau rises nearly 300 feet above the valley floor to an elevation of approximately 2,600 feet above sea level.

=== Transportation ===
Washington State Route 27 runs north–south along the eastern edge of the community, connecting Rockford with the town of Fairfield, Washington, six miles by road to the south. Approximately 15 miles by road north along State Route 27 is The City of Spokane Valley, part of the larger Spokane urban area. Washington State Route 278 begins at State Route 27 in Rockford and heads east just over five miles to the Idaho state line. State Route 278 runs through Rockford along Emma and First Streets, passing through the center of the community.

== Demographics ==
Historical population
Census	Pop.	Note	%±
1890	644		—
1900	433		−32.8%
1910	663		53.1%
1920	435		−34.4%
1930	381		−12.4%
1940	130		−65.9%
1950	152		16.9%
1960	369		142.8%
1970	327		−11.4%
1980	442		35.2%
1990	481		8.8%
2000	413		−14.1%
2010	470		13.8%
2020	522		11.1%
U.S. Decennial Census

=== 2010 census ===
As of the 2010 census, there were 470 people, 192 households, and 136 families living in the town. The population density was 691.2 inhabitants per square mile (266.9/km^{2}). There were 213 housing units at an average density of 313.2 per square mile (120.9/km^{2}). The racial makeup of the town was 92.6% White, 0.4% African American, 3.0% Native American, 1.3% Asian, 1.7% from other races, and 1.1% from two or more races. Hispanic or Latino of any race were 3.0% of the population.

There were 192 households, of which 27.1% had children under the age of 18 living with them, 57.3% were married couples living together, 8.3% had a female householder with no husband present, 5.2% had a male householder with no wife present, and 29.2% were non-families. 20.8% of all households were made up of individuals, and 7.3% had someone living alone who was 65 years of age or older. The average household size was 2.45 and the average family size was 2.78.

The median age in the town was 44.9 years. 19.4% of residents were under the age of 18; 6.9% were between the ages of 18 and 24; 24% were from 25 to 44; 33.4% were from 45 to 64; and 16.2% were 65 years of age or older. The gender makeup of the town was 50.2% male and 49.8% female.

=== 2000 census ===
As of the 2000 census, there were 413 people, 149 households, and 111 families living in the town. The population density was 607.1 people per square mile (234.5/km^{2}). There were 169 housing units at an average density of 248.4 per square mile (96.0/km^{2}). The racial makeup of the town was 97.34% White, 0.24% African American, 0.48% Native American, and 1.94% from two or more races. Hispanic or Latino of any race were 0.48% of the population.

There were 149 households, out of which 40.3% had children under the age of 18 living with them, 59.1% were married couples living together, 9.4% had a female householder with no husband present, and 25.5% were non-families. 20.8% of all households were made up of individuals, and 9.4% had someone living alone who was 65 years of age or older. The average household size was 2.77 and the average family size was 3.17.

In the town, the age distribution of the population shows 29.1% under the age of 18, 7.3% from 18 to 24, 26.9% from 25 to 44, 23.0% from 45 to 64, and 13.8% who were 65 years of age or older. The median age was 38 years. For every 100 females, there were 99.5 males. For every 100 females age 18 and over, there were 98.0 males.

The median income for a household in the town was $40,227, and the median income for a family was $45,125. Males had a median income of $31,339 versus $25,417 for females. The per capita income for the town was $16,411. About 11.9% of families and 12.1% of the population were below the poverty line, including 18.4% of those under age 18 and 3.6% of those age 65 or over.

== Gallery ==
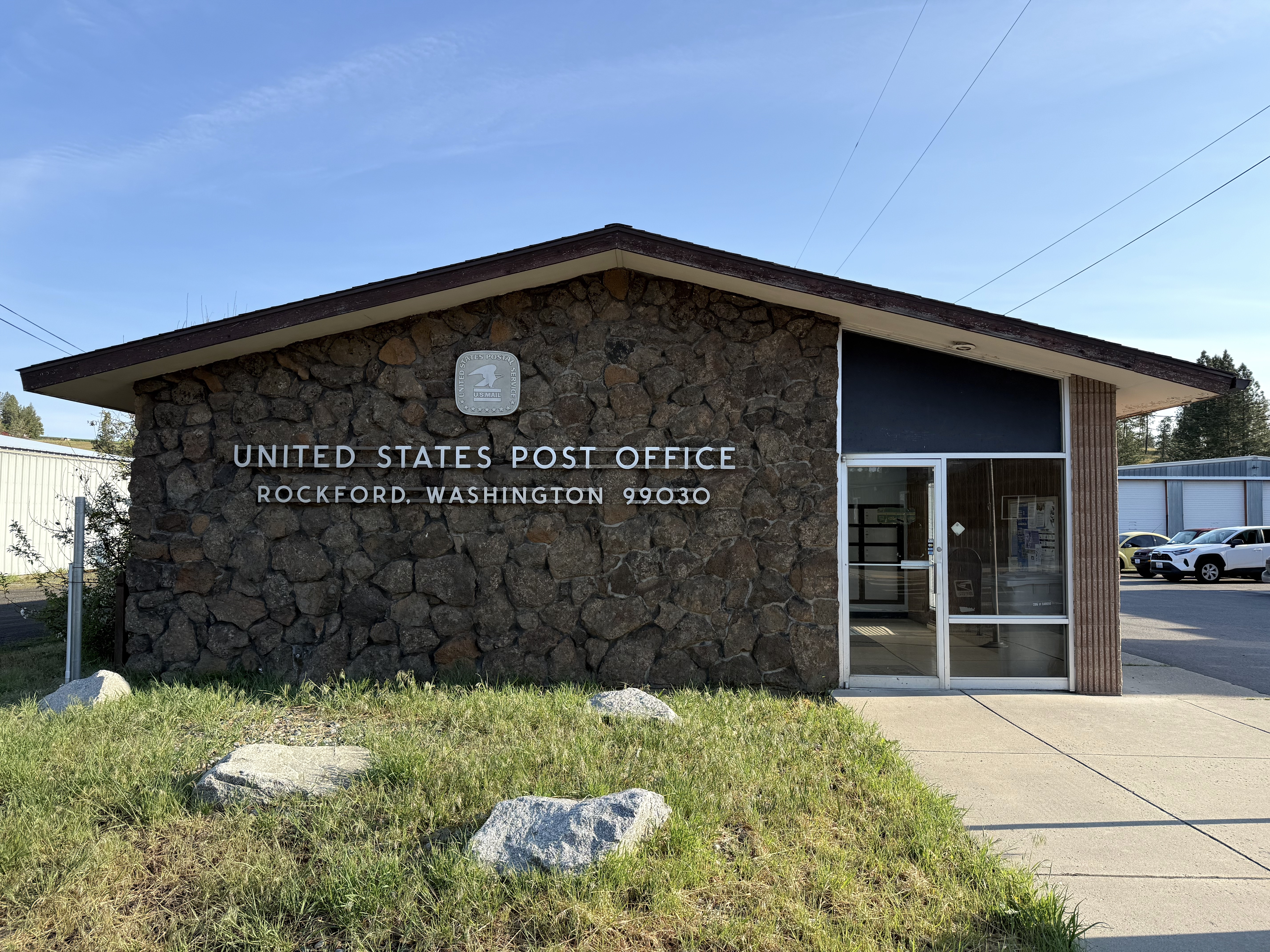
Rockford Post Office

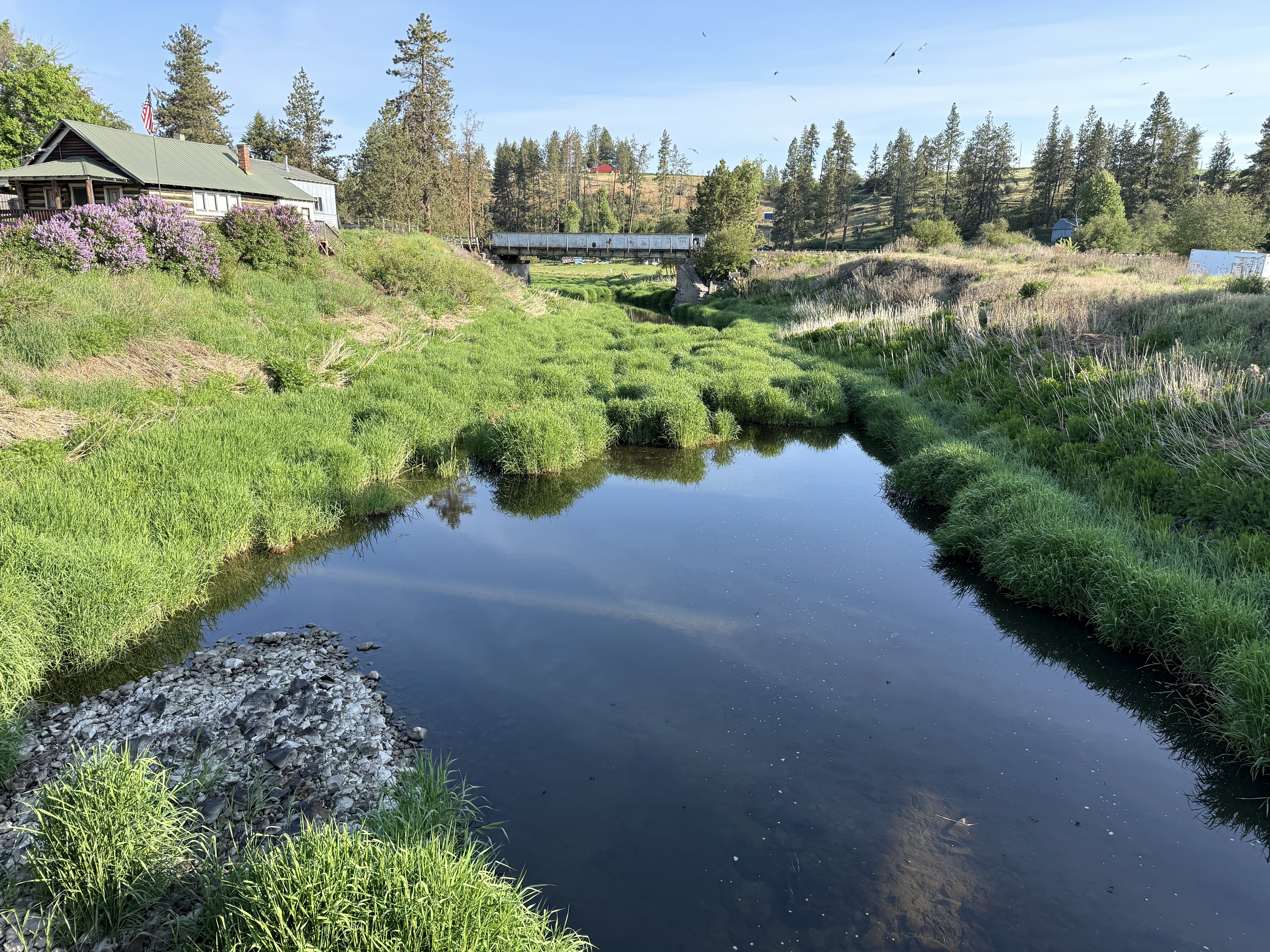
Rock Creek from the Emma Street Bridge

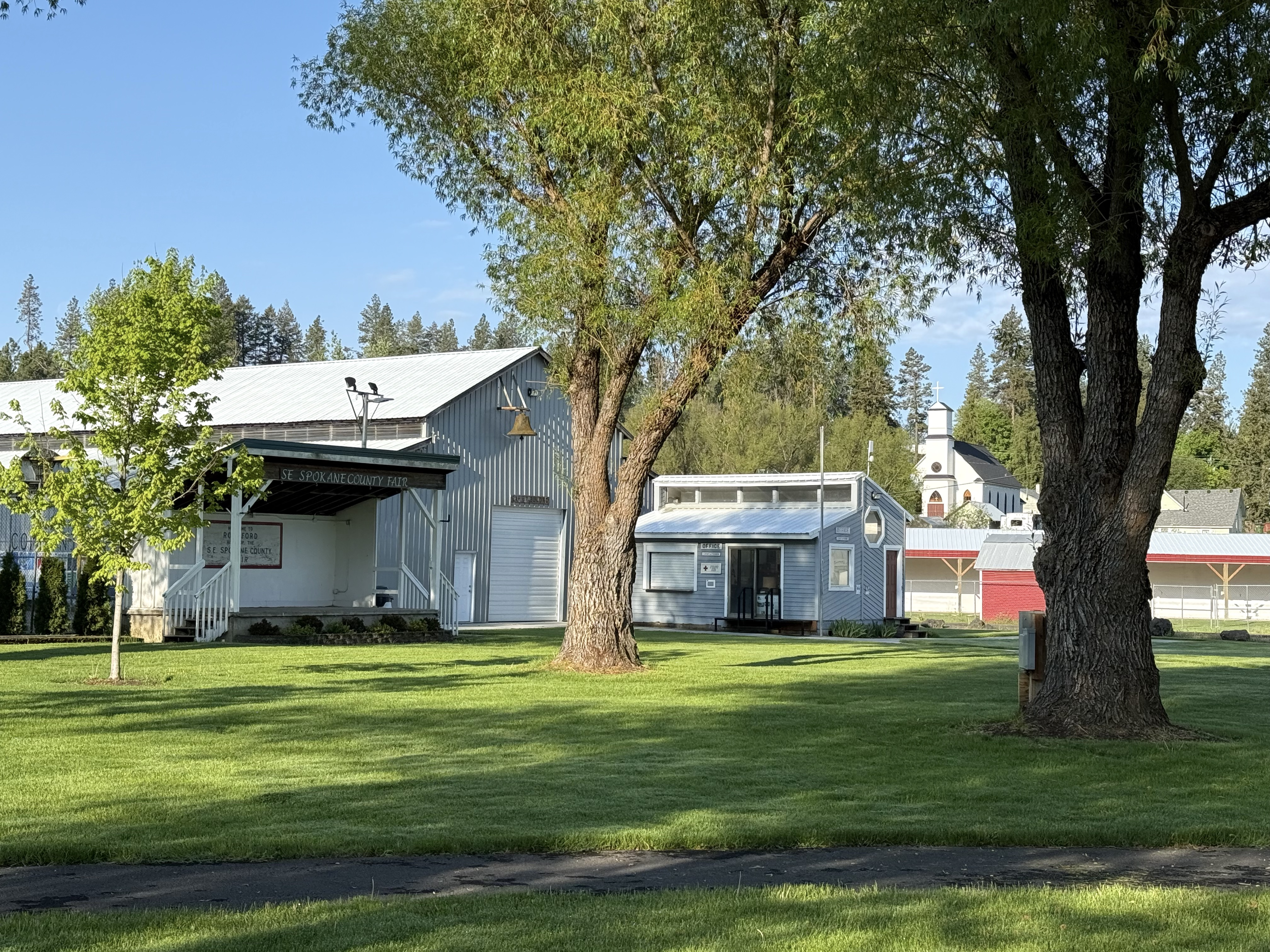
Rockford City Park and SE Spokane County Fair bandstand

== See also ==
- List of towns in Washington (state)
