= Richard Worley =

Richard Worley may refer to:

- Richard Worley (pirate) (died 1718/19), pirate active in the Caribbean and along the east coast of the American Colonies
- Richard Worley (police officer) (born 1964 or 1965), American police officer and commissioner of the Baltimore Police Department since 2023

== See also ==
- Rick Worley, American cartoonist
- Richard Worsley (disambiguation)
