= Coeur d'Alene Casino =

Casino on the Coeur d'Alene Reservation in Kootenai County, Idaho, United States

Coeur d'Alene Casino Resort Hotel
- Interactive map of Coeur d'Alene Casino Resort Hotel
- Location: Coeur d'Alene Reservation, Kootenai County, Idaho, U.S.; 37914 South Nukwalqw Street Worley, Idaho; 47.42677°N 116.97388°W
- Opened: 1993
- Theme: Native American
- Gaming space: 100,000 square feet (9,300 m^{2})
- Signature attractions: casino, gaming, golf, spa, hotel, dining, gas, gift shop, events, concerts
- Casino type: Native American gambling enterprise
- Owner: Coeur d'Alene Tribe
- Website: www.cdacasino.com

The Coeur d'Alene Casino is a Native American gaming enterprise run by the Coeur d'Alene people on the Coeur d'Alene Reservation in Kootenai County, Idaho, United States, northwest of Worley. The resort includes two hotel towers, the Circling Raven Golf Club, multiple restaurants, a 15,000-square-foot (1,400 m^{2}) spa, and 100,000 square feet (9,300 m^{2}) of casino floor space. The Coeur d'Alene Casino is currently one of the largest employers in the Northern Idaho region.

== History ==
In 1992, the Coeur d'Alene people began the process of negotiating with the State of Idaho, inaugurating a bingo hall in 1993. The 20,000-square-foot property's initial cost was $2.7 million. The project was managed by chief executive officer Dave Matheson, who also served as tribal chairman and deputy commissioner of Indian Affairs during President George H. W. Bush's administration.

In 1994, Matheson and eLottery chairman Robert A. Berman initiated the National Indian Lottery on behalf of the Coeur d'Alene people. The project consisted of the first multi-state lottery and was aimed at generating funds to help develop the Coeur d’Alene casino.

In 1994, the National Indian Lottery received approval from the federal government. It initially operated via telephone sales, and later through the Internet. Robert A. Berman assisted in the development of the technology for the project that managed and monitored the necessary security, age, and border controls required to process lottery transactions. In 1996, the casino received a $14 million expansion, and by 1998, it made net profits that totaled $9.2 million. The National Indian Lottery concluded in 1998 after receiving opposition from Attorney General Skip Humphrey via the United States District Court for the District of Idaho.

The casino has since gone through various major expansions and renovations. The resort currently includes two hotel towers, the Circling Raven Golf Club, the 15,000-square-foot (1,400 m^{2}) Spa Ssaskwa'q'n, and eight restaurants. The casino offers Class III gaming on its 100,000-square-foot (9,300 m^{2}) casino floor with nearly 1,200 video gaming machines. Profits from the casino's revenues are invested back into the Coeur d'Alene community in areas of education and finance, including investments in property and land. In 2019, Laura Penney (formerly known as Laura Stensgar) became the casino's new CEO.

== Facilities ==
The Coeur d'Alene Casino includes nearly 1,200 video gaming machines (video poker, Shuffle Master electronic tables, and keno), a bingo hall, entertainment venues, spa, retail areas, and multiple restaurants. It also includes a luxury hotel and the award-winning Circling Raven Golf Club.

== See also ==
- List of casinos in Idaho
- List of casino hotels
