= Ted R. Worley =

American teacher and historian (1906–1969)

Ted Raymond Worley (June 1, 1906–January 1, 1969) was an American teacher, historian, editor, cataloguer, and author in the U.S. state of Arkansas. He wrote articles and books.

== Early life and education ==
Worley was born in Pope County, Arkansas. He graduated from Russellville High School and Arkansas State Teachers College. He received a Master's degree from the University of Texas.

== Career ==
Worley edited the Arkansas Historical Quarterly. He wrote an article on Helena, Arkansas. He also wrote an article on the Real Estate Bank of the State of Arkansas. He wrote about the Arkansas Peace Society of 1861.

Worley compiled and indexed past issues of the Arkansas Historical Quarterly. He also documented pre-1900 Arkansas newspapers. A collection of his papers were published in 1946. His letter to Walter Lee Brown at the University of Arkansas was published. A collection of his Arkansas Folklore Society papers was published.

== Personal life ==
Worley married Beatrice L. Connell of Conway, Arkansas in 1929. They had no children. They lived at 324 Western Avenue.

== Writings ==
- At Home in Confederate Arkansas; Letters to and from Pulaski Countians, 1861–1865, editor (1955)
- The War Memoirs of Captain John W. Lavender, C.S.A. (1956)
- Pete Whetstone of Devil’s Fork (1957)
- A History of the Arkansas State Teachers College
- An Early Arkansas Sportsman, C.F.M. Noland (1952)

== Inventories ==
- Catalogue of the Clara Bertha Eno Collection
- Catalogue of the Robert Wilson Trimble Collection, Arkansas History Commission (1955)

== Articles ==
- Pope County One Hundred Years Ago (1953)
- Catalogue of the John C. Barrow Papers (1955)
- Arkansas and the money crisis of 1836–1837 (1949)
- Pioneer Ways and Their Meaning (1954)
- Early History of Des Arc and Its People (1957)
- Notes on the 1922 Railroad Strike as it related to Little Rock and Arkansas
