= Worley Point =

Islands of Antarctica

Coordinates: 74°24′23″S 132°46′32″W

Location in Antarctica

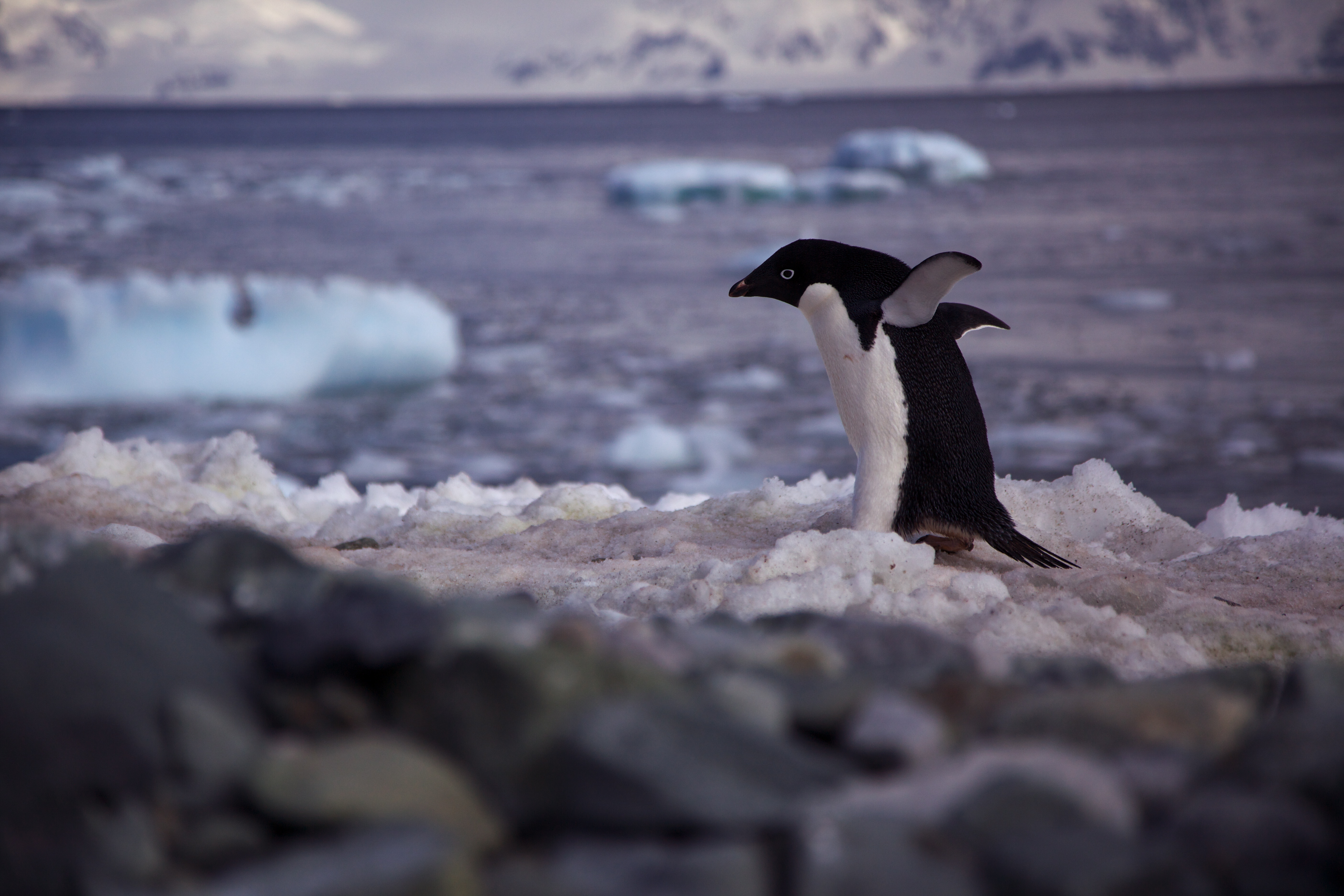
Adélie penguins breed in the IBA

Worley Point is a narrow, flat and rocky headland extending about 1 km along the north-western coast of Shepard Island, Marie Byrd Land, Antarctica. As with Grant Island, 9 km eastward, Shepard Island is surrounded by the Getz Ice Shelf except on its northern side. The point was named by the Advisory Committee on Antarctic Names (US-ACAN) for Lieutenant Richard J. Worley, U.S. Navy, Medical Officer at South Pole Station in 1969.

== Important Bird Area ==
An 8 ha site comprising all ice-free ground at the point has been designated an Important Bird Area (IBA) by BirdLife International because it supports a breeding colony of about 10,000 Adélie penguins, as estimated from 2010 satellite imagery.

== See also ==
- Mount Petinos
