= 413th Flight Test Group =

US Air Force Reserve Command unit

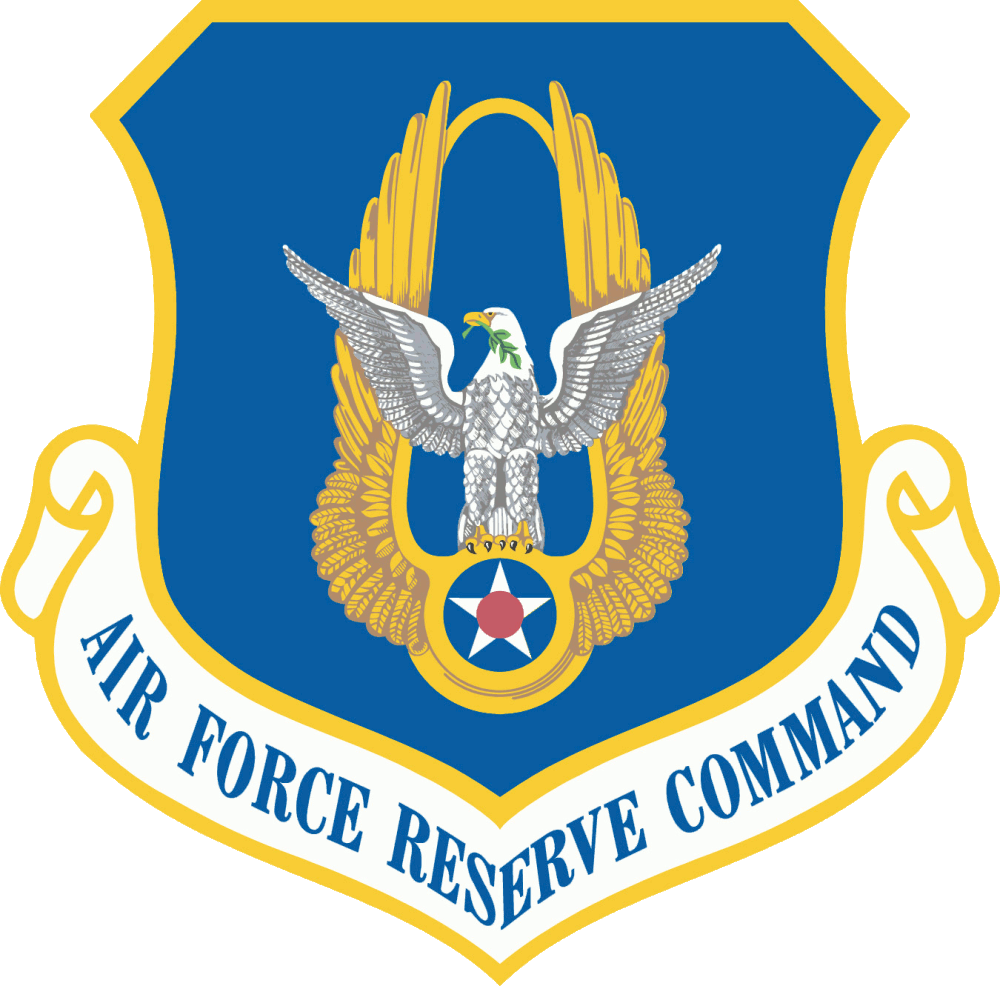
413th Flight Test Group

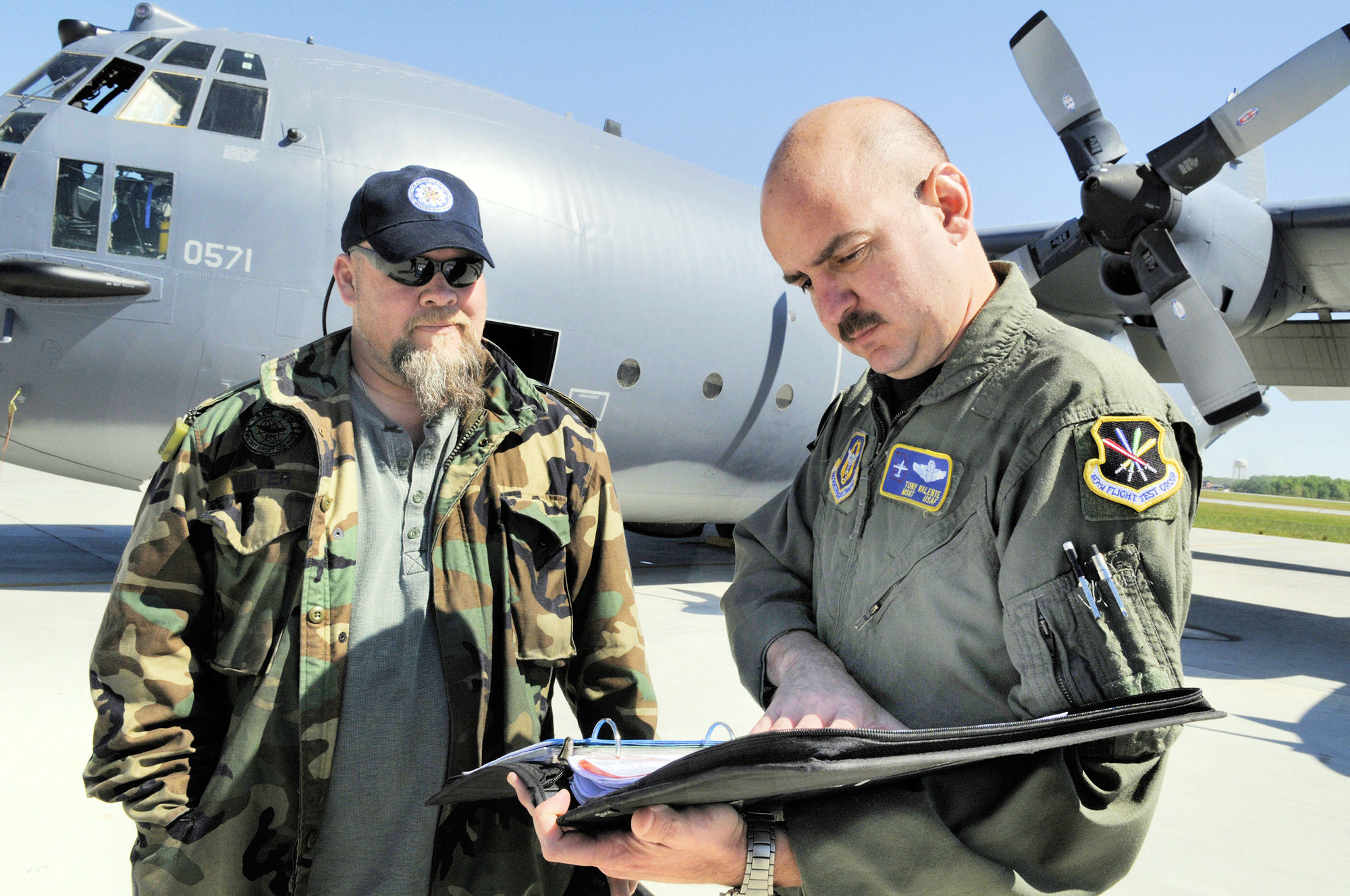
- Members of the 339th Flight Test Squadron prepare for a test flight of an MC-130E
- Active: 1944–1946; 1953–1959; 2003–present
- Country: United States
- Branch: United States Air Force
- Role: Flight testing
- Part of: Air Force Reserve Command
- Garrison/HQ: Robins Air Force Base, Georgia
- Motto: Siva
- Engagements: Asiatic-Pacific Campaign (1944–1945)

Insignia
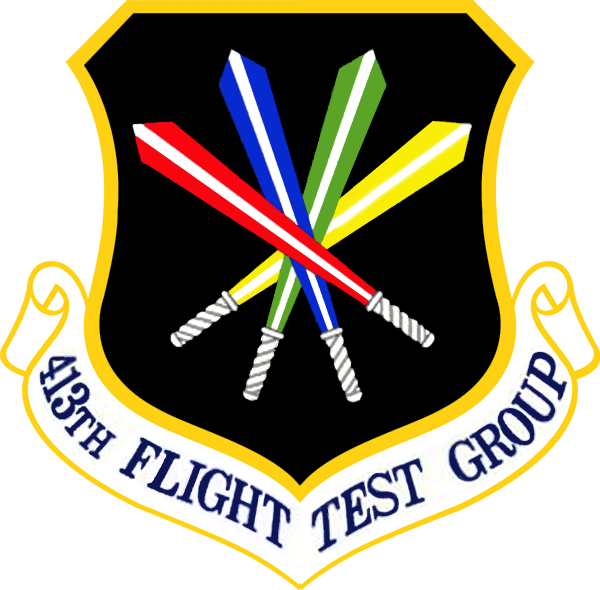
- 413th Flight Test Group emblem (Note: Approved 26 April 1955.)

The 413th Flight Test Group is a United States Air Force Air Force Reserve Command unit. It is stationed at Robins Air Force Base, Georgia as a tenant unit.

The group conducts flight tests on aircraft after programmed depot maintenance (PDM) is completed. Its history goes back to 1944 when the 413th Fighter Group flew very long range escort missions of Twentieth Air Force Boeing B-29 Superfortress bombardment groups against Japan. During the Cold War, the unit was a Strategic Air Command fighter-escort wing and later Tactical Air Command tactical fighter group in the 1950s.

Today, the group's units are stationed throughout the United States to help conduct functional flight tests. The group is a partnership between the Air Force Materiel Command and the Air Force Reserve Command and is the operational supervisor of all the depot flight test units. The group manages five squadrons and two flights is made up of 140 full-time airmen, 78 traditional reservist and nine civil servants. Once PDM is completed, members of the flight crew begin a variety of ground checks to make sure the aircraft is ready for a functional test flight. Once the aircraft is deemed airworthy, then the airplane is delivered to the home station and is configured to fly whatever mission it is assigned to fly.

== Assigned units and aircraft flown ==
10th Flight Test Squadron (Tinker AFB, OK) B-1, B-52, E-3, KC-135, RC-135, KC-46
313th Flight Test Flight (Lackland AFB, TX) KC-135, C-17 (2001–2013)
339th Flight Test Squadron (Robins AFB, GA) C-5, C-130, F-15
370th Flight Test Squadron (Edwards AFB, CA) C-12, KC-10, KC-135
415th Flight Test Flight (Randolph AFB, TX) T-38, T-6
514th Flight Test Squadron (Hill AFB, UT) A-10, F-16, F-22, F-35, C-130
413th Force Support Flight (Robins AFB, GA)
413th Aeromedical Staging Squadron (Robins AFB, GA)

== History ==
=== World War II ===
The unit served primarily in the Pacific Ocean theater of World War II as part of Twentieth Air Force. The 413th's aircraft flew very long range escort missions of Boeing B-29 Superfortress bombardment groups against Japan.

Constituted as the 413th Fighter Group on 5 October 1944 and activated on 15 October. Trained for very-long-range operations with Republic P-47N Thunderbolts.

Moved to the South West Pacific Area, April–June 1945. The group was assigned to the Twentieth Air Force VII Fighter Command, 301st Fighter Wing. Was reassigned to the Seventh Air Force early in August 1945. Flew a few strafing missions from Saipan to the Truk Islands in May before beginning operations from Ie Shima in June. Engaged in dive-bombing and strafing attacks on factories, radar stations, airfields, small ships, and other targets in Japan. Made several attacks on shipping and airfields in China during July. Flew its only escort mission on 8 August 1945 when it covered B-29's during a raid against Yawata, Kyoto, Japan.

=== Cold War ===
Served as a part of the air defense and occupation force for the Ryukyu Islands after the war. Inactivated on Okinawa on 15 October 1946.

Activated as part of Tactical Air Command in 1954. Trained to achieve and maintain combat readiness by participation in tactical exercises, firepower demonstrations, joint training with US Army and US Marine Corps units, and tactical evaluations. Provided augmentation of Sixteenth Air Force in Spain, through deployment of assigned squadrons on a rotational basis, 1958–1959.

== Lineage ==
413th Fighter Group

- Established as the 413th Fighter Group, Single Engine on 5 October 1944

Activated on 15 October 1944
Inactivated on 15 October 1946
Redesignated 413th Fighter-Day Group on 27 October 1954
Activated on 11 November 1954
Inactivated on 8 October 1957
Consolidated with the 413th Strategic Fighter Wing as the 413th Strategic Fighter Wing on 31 January 1984

413th Flight Test Group

- Established as the 413th Strategic Fighter Wing on 23 March 1953

Redesignated 413th Fighter-Day Wing on 26 September 1957
Activated on 8 October 1957
Redesignated 413th Tactical Fighter Wing on 1 July 1958
Inactivated on 15 March 1959
Consolidated with the 413th Fighter-Day Grop on 31 January 1984
Redesignated 413th Flight Test Group on 18 July 2003
Activated in the Reserve on 1 October 2003

=== Assignments ===
- First Air Force, 15 October 1944
- 301st Fighter Wing, 2 November 1944 – 15 October 1946
- Ninth Air Force, 11 November 1954 (attached to 479th Fighter-Day Wing, 11 November 1954 – 7 October 1957)
- Eighteenth Air Force, 1 October 1957
- 831st Air Division, 8 October 1957 – 15 March 1959
- Twenty-Second Air Force, 1 October 2003 – present

=== Components ===
- 1st Fighter Squadron (later, 1st Fighter-Day Squadron, 1st Tactical Fighter Squadron): 15 October 1944 – 15 October 1946; 11 November 1954 – 15 March 1959 (detached 27 June – c. 12 November 1958)
- 10th Flight Test Squadron: 1 October 2003 – present
- 21st Fighter Squadron (later, 21st Fighter-Day Squadron, 21st Tactical Fighter Squadron): 15 October 1944 – 15 October 1946; 11 November 1954 – 15 March 1959 (detached 14–15 March 1959)
- 34th Fighter Squadron (later 34th Fighter-Day Squadron 34th Tactical Fighter Squadron): 15 October 1944 – 15 October 1946; 11 November 1954 – 15 March 1959
- 339th Flight Test Squadron: 1 October 2003 – present
- 370th Flight Test Squadron: 1 October 2003 – present
- 474th Fighter-Day Squadron (later 474th Tactical Fighter Squadron): 8 October 1957 – 15 March 1959 (detached 11 November 1958 – 15 March 1959)
- 514th Flight Test Squadron: 1 October 2003 – present
- 413th Aeromedical Staging Squadron:

Flights

- 313th Flight Test Flight: 1 October 2003 – 2013
- 415th Flight Test Flight: 1 October 2003–present
- 420th Flight Test Flight: 1 October 2003 – 1 September 2007
- 413th Force Support Flight:

=== Stations ===
- Seymour Johnson Field, NC 15 October 1944
- Bluethenthal Field, NC November 1944 – 6 April 1945
- Ie Shima Airfield, Okinawa, 19 May 1945
- Kadena Field, Okinawa 10 November 1945
- Yontan Airfield, Okinawa, 29 January – October 1946
- George Air Force Base, California, 11 November 1954 – 15 March 1959
- Robins Air Force Base, Georgia, 1 October 2003–present

=== Aircraft Assigned ===
- Republic P-47 Thunderbolt 1944–1946
- North American F-86 Sabre, 1954–1956
- North American F-100 Super Sabre, 1955–1959
