= Worley, Kentucky =

Unincorporated community in Kentucky, United States

- Unincorporated community
- Location within Kentucky Location within the United States
- Coordinates: 36°41′58″N 84°32′2″W
- Country: United States
- State: Kentucky
- County: McCreary
- Elevation: 889 ft (271 m)
- Time zone: UTC-6 (Central (CST))
  - Summer (DST): UTC-5 (CST)
- GNIS feature ID: 516484

Worley is an unincorporated community and coal town in McCreary County, Kentucky, United States. Its post office closed on October 31, 1953.
