= Robert F. Worley =

US Air Force general killed in the Vietnam War (1919–1968)

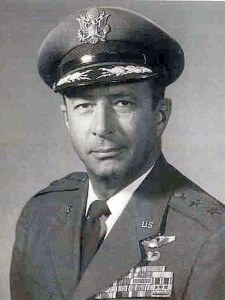
- Born: October 10, 1919; Riverside, California, U.S.
- Died: July 23, 1968 (aged 48); Thừa Thiên Province, South Vietnam
- Burial place: Arlington National Cemetery
- Military career
- Allegiance: United States of America
- Branch: United States Army Air Forces; United States Air Force
- Service years: 1940–1968
- Rank: Major General
- Commands: USAAF: 314th Fighter Squadron (North Africa); 1st Fighter Squadron (Pacific)
- Conflicts: World War II; Vietnam War †
- Awards: Air Force Distinguished Service Medal; Silver Star; Legion of Merit; Distinguished Flying Cross; Air Medal (8); Air Force Commendation Medal; Army Commendation Medal; Purple Heart (3)

Robert Franklin Worley (October 10, 1919 – July 23, 1968) was a United States Air Force major general and fighter pilot who was killed in action in 1968, in South Vietnam. General Worley was one of three U.S. Air Force general officers (pilots) who were casualties of the Vietnam War.

== Early life ==
General Worley was born in Riverside, California.

== US Air Force career ==
Worley began his military career in October 1940 at March Field, California and graduated from pilot training at Brooks Field, Texas, in May 1941, and was commissioned a second lieutenant. During the next two years he served at Mitchel Field, New York, Bolling Field, Washington, D.C. and Baltimore Municipal Airport as a fighter pilot and as a squadron commander.

=== World War II ===
During World War II, he participated in the North African, Sicily, and Italian campaigns, and the Pacific theater campaigns. His combat record included 120 aerial missions with 215 combat hours in the P-40 and P-47 fighter planes. While in command of the 314th Fighter Squadron based in North Africa, Captain Worley was shot down on his first mission while flying close air support for US ground troops in the African desert, he walked back through the enemy lines and returned to his unit. Promoted to major, he went on to command the 1st Fighter Squadron in the Pacific War.

Following World War II, he helped organize and commanded the jet transitional school at Williams Field, Arizona.

=== Vietnam War and death ===
General Worley commanded the 831st Air Division at George Air Force Base, California and was then assigned to Tactical Air Command headquarters on 30 December 1964 as assistant deputy for operations, command and control. He then transferred to Twelfth Air Force headquarters in Waco, Texas, where he served as deputy for operations. He also served as Director of Operations for U.S. Air Forces in Europe, with headquarters in Germany. A graduate of the Air Command and Staff School, Maxwell Air Force Base, Ala., and the Industrial College of the Armed Forces, Fort McNair, Washington, D.C., General Worley was rated a command pilot and parachutist.

In 1966, Worley was appointed as vice-commander of the Seventh Air Force.

On 23 July 1968, he was flying an RF-4C Phantom aircraft when it was hit by ground fire and crashed approximately 65 miles (105 km) northwest of Da Nang Air Base, South Vietnam. His backseater, Major Robert Brodman, ejected safely and was rescued.

He and his wife, Bette Lorraine Worley (1920–2011), are buried at Arlington National Cemetery, in Arlington, Virginia. Their son, Robert M. Worley II, graduated from the United States Air Force Academy in 1978 and retired as a Major-General in 2011.

== See also ==
- William Crumm
