= Worley, Idaho =

- City
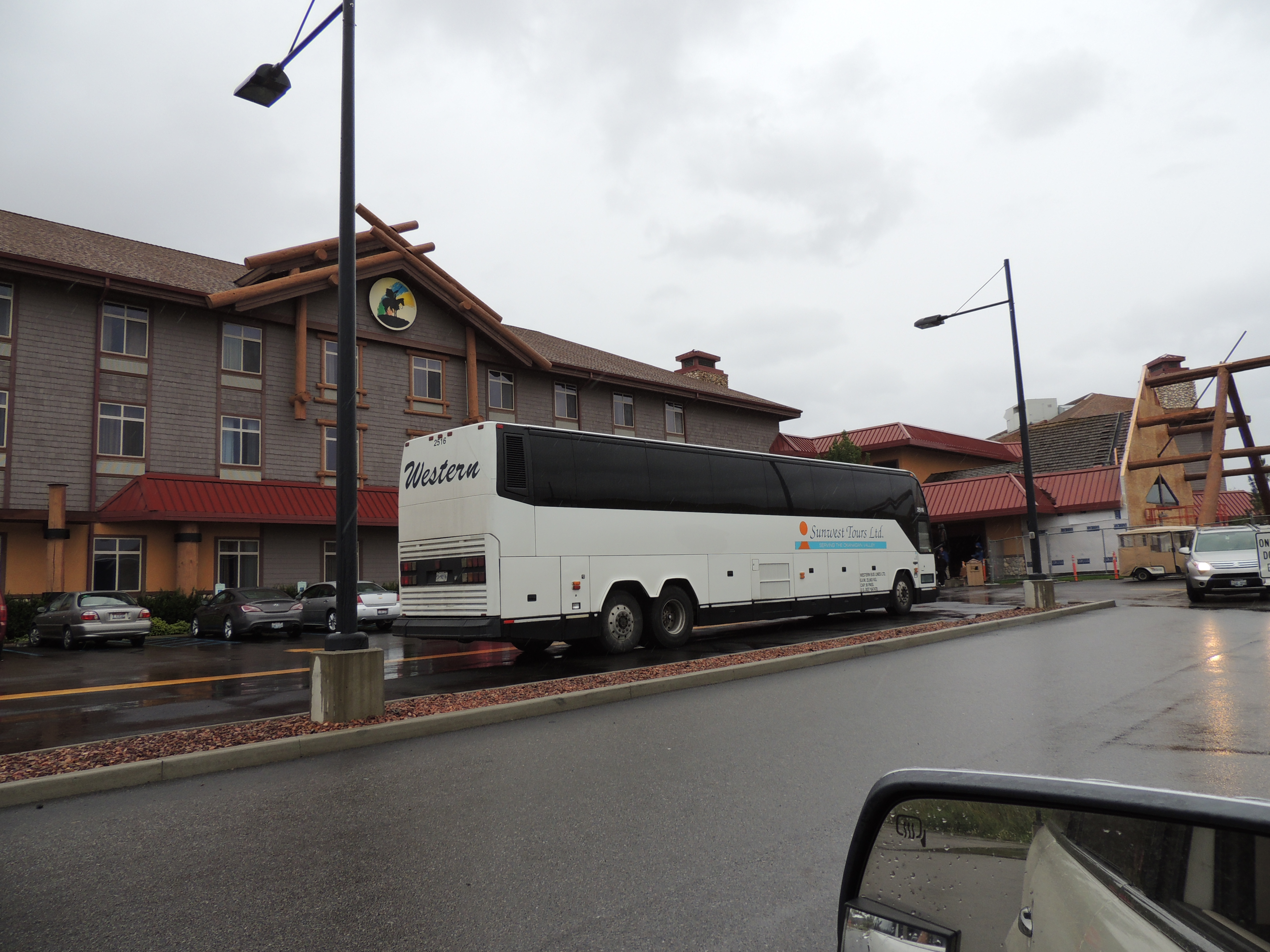
- The Coeur d’Alene Casino

- Location of Worley in Kootenai County, Idaho.

- Location in the United States
- Coordinates: 47°24′02″N 116°55′09″W
- Country: United States
- State: Idaho
- County: Kootenai

Area
  - Total: 0.19 sq mi (0.50 km^{2})
  - Land: 0.19 sq mi (0.50 km^{2})
  - Water: 0 sq mi (0.00 km^{2})
- Elevation: 2,644 ft (806 m)

Population (2020)
  - Total: 253
  - Density: 1,350.4/sq mi (521.41/km^{2})
- Time zone: UTC-8 (Pacific (PST))
  - Summer (DST): UTC-7 (PDT)
- ZIP code: 83876
- Area code: 208
- FIPS code: 16-88480
- GNIS feature ID: 2412309

Worley is a city in southwestern Kootenai County, Idaho, United States. As of the 2020 census, Worley had a population of 253. The city is within the Coeur d'Alene Indian Reservation.

== Geography ==
According to the United States Census Bureau, the city has a total area of 0.19 square miles (0.49 km^{2}), all land.

To the south of the village are gentle hills heavily wooded with evergreens and a year around community of deer, elk, wild turkey and black bears. 17 acres of tribal community gardens are located off to the North of Worley.

== Demographics ==
Historical population
Census	Pop.	Note	%±
1930	199		—
1940	241		21.1%
1950	233		−3.3%
1960	241		3.4%
1970	235		−2.5%
1980	206		−12.3%
1990	182		−11.7%
2000	223		22.5%
2010	257		15.2%
2020	253		−1.6%
2019 (est.)	262		1.9%
U.S. Decennial Census

=== 2010 census ===
As of the census of 2010, there were 257 people, 104 households, and 57 families living in the city. The population density was 1,352.6 inhabitants per square mile (522.2/km^{2}). There were 116 housing units at an average density of 610.5 per square mile (235.7/km^{2}). The racial makeup of the city was 56.0% White, 0.8% African American, 28.0% Native American, 1.6% from other races, and 13.6% from two or more races. Hispanic or Latino of any race were 5.8% of the population.

There were 104 households, of which 27.9% had children under the age of 18 living with them, 36.5% were married couples living together, 7.7% had a female householder with no husband present, 10.6% had a male householder with no wife present, and 45.2% were non-families. 34.6% of all households were made up of individuals, and 10.5% had someone living alone who was 65 years of age or older. The average household size was 2.47 and the average family size was 3.19.

The median age in the city was 37.3 years. 26.1% of residents were under the age of 18; 10.9% were between the ages of 18 and 24; 24.1% were from 25 to 44; 25.3% were from 45 to 64; and 13.6% were 65 years of age or older. The gender makeup of the city was 52.1% male and 47.9% female.

=== 2000 census ===
As of the census of 2000, there were 223 people, 81 households, and 54 families living in the city. The population density was 1,178.6 inhabitants per square mile (455.1/km^{2}). There were 95 housing units at an average density of 502.1 per square mile (193.9/km^{2}). The racial makeup of the city was 69.06% White, 0.45% African American, 28.70% Native American, 0.45% from other races, and 1.35% from two or more races. Hispanic or Latino of any race were 2.69% of the population.

There were 81 households, out of which 33.3% had children under the age of 18 living with them, 55.6% were married couples living together, 8.6% had a female householder with no husband present, and 32.1% were non-families. 24.7% of all households were made up of individuals, and 13.6% had someone living alone who was 65 years of age or older. The average household size was 2.75 and the average family size was 3.29.

In the city, the population was spread out, with 28.3% under the age of 18, 9.0% from 18 to 24, 26.0% from 25 to 44, 16.6% from 45 to 64, and 20.2% who were 65 years of age or older. The median age was 36 years. For every 100 females, there were 93.9 males. For every 100 females age 18 and over, there were 88.2 males.

The median income for a household in the city was $27,500, and the median income for a family was $32,813. Males had a median income of $33,750 versus $20,833 for females. The per capita income for the city was $10,975. About 17.2% of families and 19.8% of the population were below the poverty line, including 23.1% of those under the age of eighteen and none of those 65 or over.

== Facilities ==
Children are able to attend preschool through grade 12 in Plummer, Idaho, or attend the Tribal School in Desmet, Idaho, with free Citylink bus service.

The CDA Nation provides health care, in addition to regular free bus service for all people to Spokane, CDA, and rural routes on the reservation every day from Worley.

Worley is well known for its numerous fireworks stands and assigned places to detonate them.
