= 918th Air Refueling Squadron =

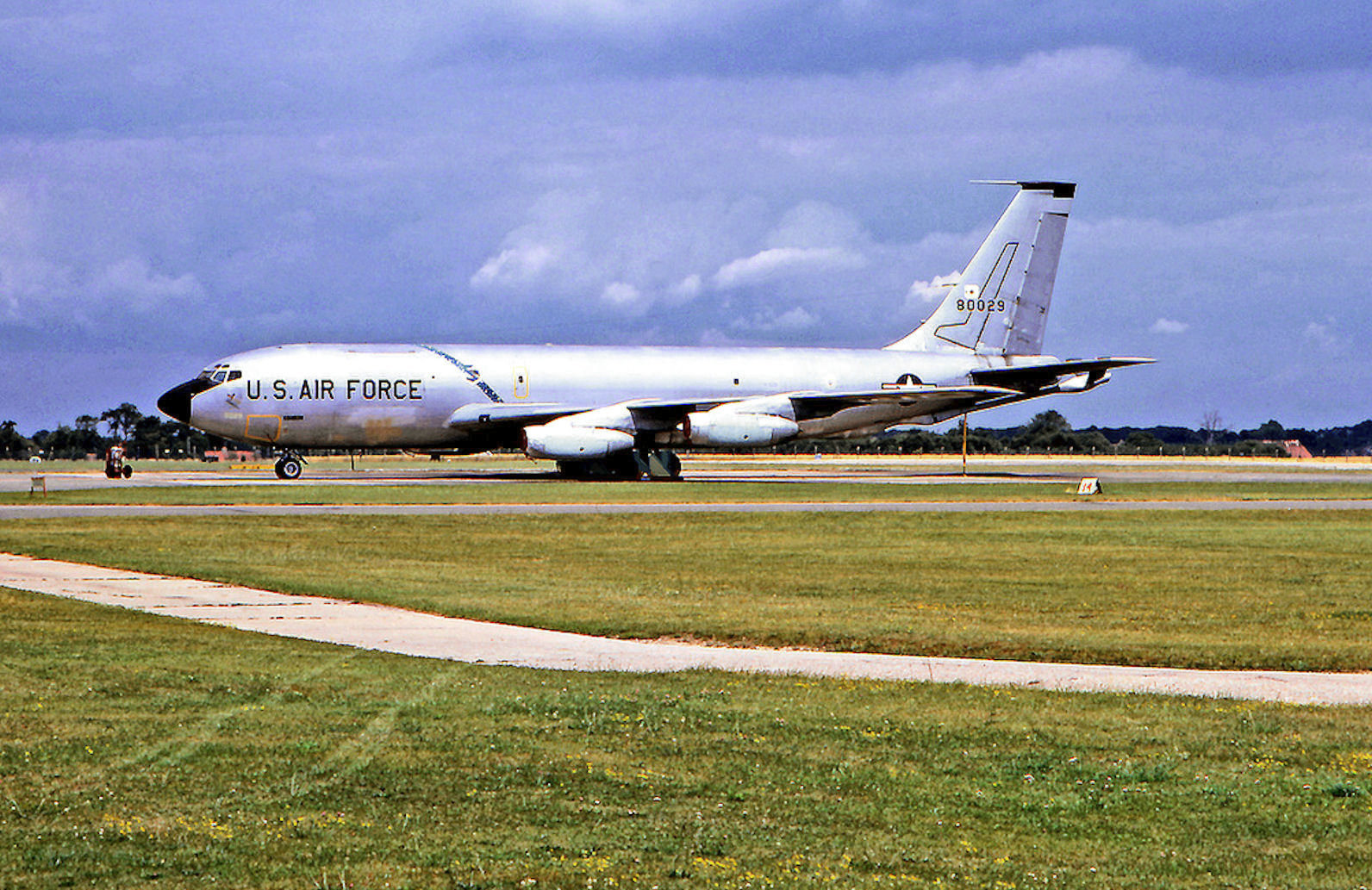
- KC-135 tanker in 1960s SAC markings
- Active: 1942–1944; 1947–1949; 1960
- Country: United States
- Branch: United States Air Force
- Role: Air refueling
- Engagements: Pacific Theater of Operations

The 918th Air Refueling Squadron is an inactive United States Air Force unit. It was last assigned to the 11th Bombardment Wing at Altus Air Force Base, Oklahoma.

The 918th's predecessor, the 18th Combat Mapping Squadron, was active during World War II. Although most of the squadron remained in the United States during the war, part of its air echelon deployed to the Pacific where it performed photographic mapping missions until the unit was inactivated in 1944.

The squadron was allotted to the Air Force Reserve as the 18th Reconnaissance Squadron and assigned to the 66th Strategic Reconnaissance Group at Newark Army Air Base, New Jersey in 1947. It does not appear to have been fully equipped or manned before it was inactivated in 1949 as the reserves reorganized and eliminated units in the wake of President Truman's 1949 defense budget cuts.

The 918th Air Refueling Squadron was organized at Altus in October 1960 along with the 921st Air Refueling Squadron as part of Strategic Air Command's plan to disperse its bomber force. However, planning changed a little over a month later and the squadron was inactivated and its personnel and equipment were returned to the 96th Air Refueling Squadron, which had provided its initial cadre. The 18th and 918th squadrons were consolidated into a single unit in 1985.

== History ==
=== World War II ===
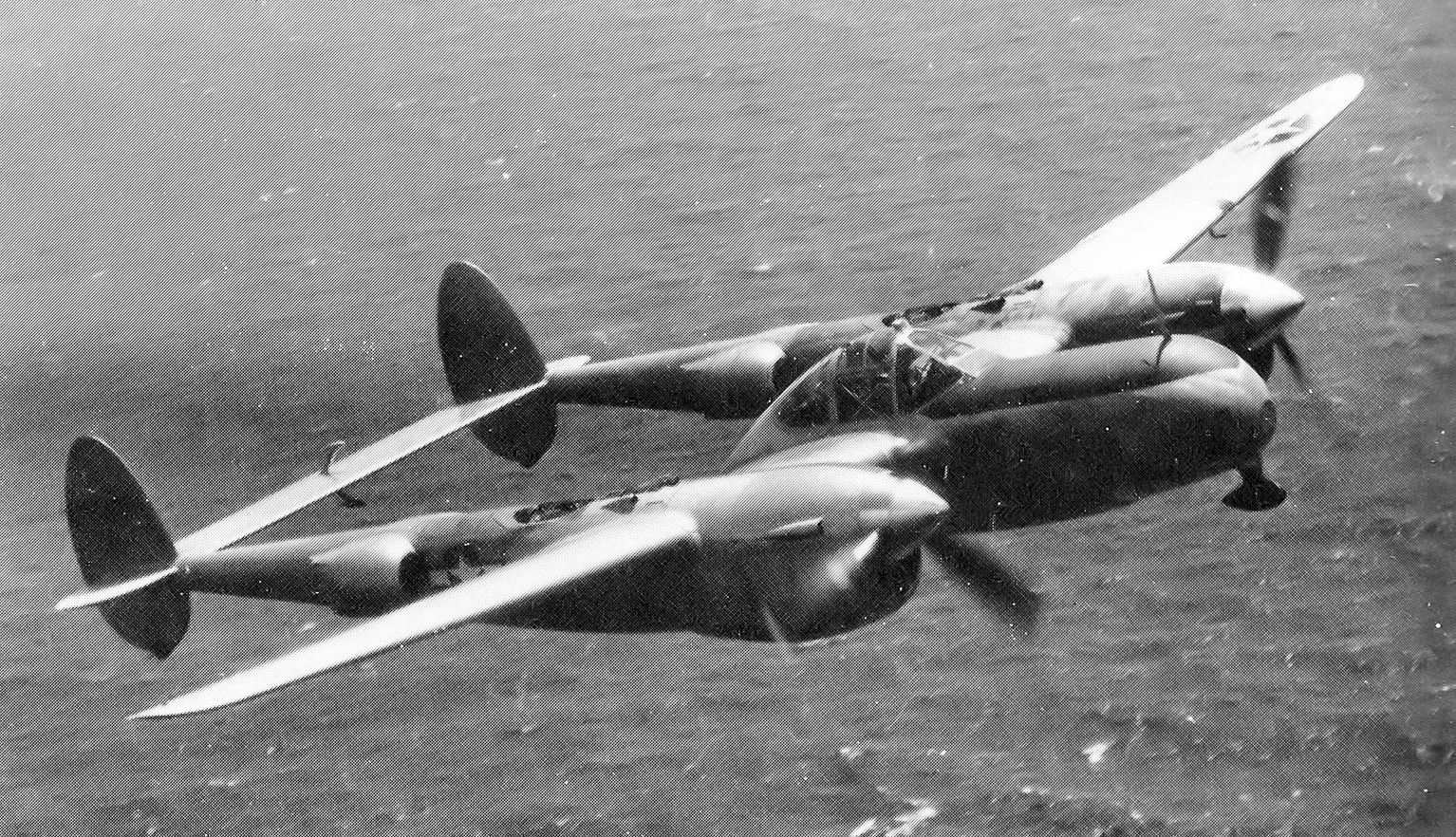
F-5 Lightning

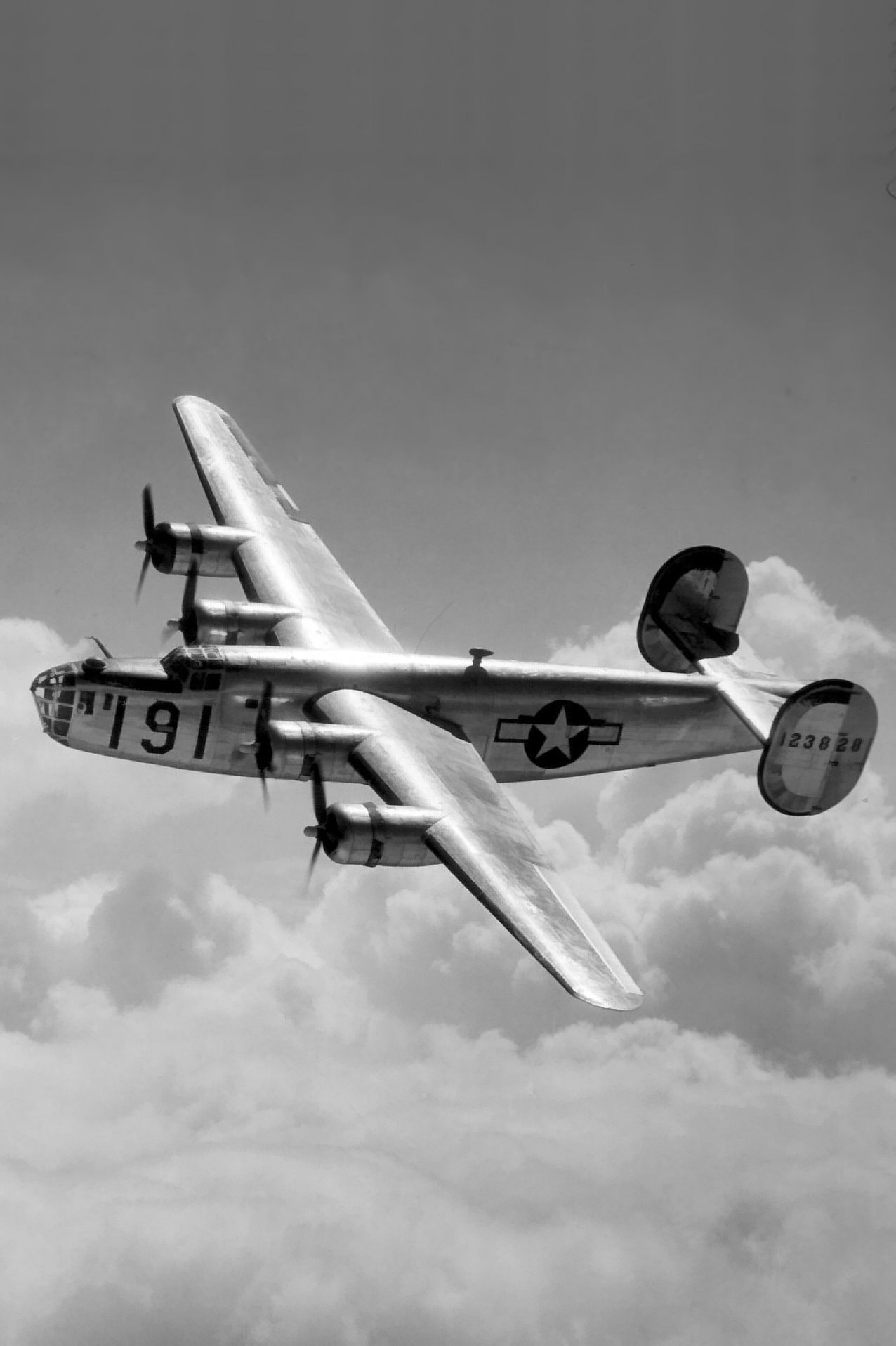
B-24 Liberator of a US based unit

The squadron was first activated in July 1943 as the 18th Photographic Mapping Squadron at Colorado Springs Army Air Base, one of the original squadrons of the 4th Photographic Group, and equipped with Lockheed F-5 Lighting reconnaissance aircraft. It trained in photographic reconnaissance under Second Air Force. In late 1942, the 4th group deployed to the South Pacific, where it flew combat missions with Thirteenth Air Force. However, only a portion of the squadron's air echelon deployed with the group. This part of the squadron re-equipped with North American B-25 Mitchells.

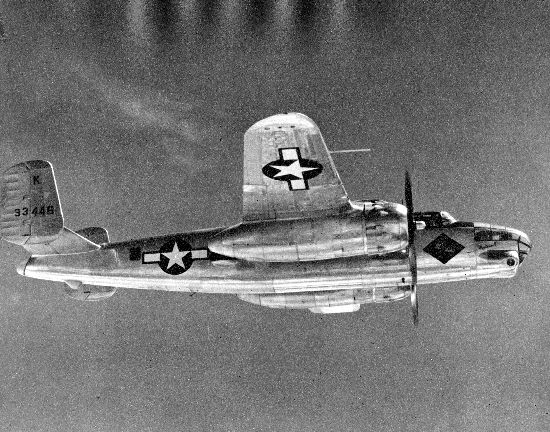
Reconnaissance version of the B-25 Mitchell

The bulk of the air echelon equipped with Consolidated B-24 Liberators and remained in the United States. The deployed elements of the squadron flew missions over enemy-held territory in Guadalcanal, New Guinea, the northern Solomon Islands, and the Bismarck Archipelago. The unit became the 18th Combat Mapping Squadron and produced maps of Allied and enemy held territory and prepared navigational charts for American units. After October 1943, the unit was attached to the 8th Photographic Reconnaissance Group in the China Burma India Theater and operated under that group's control until January 1944. Simultaneously with the attachment of the deployed air echelon to the 8th group, the element remaining behind in the United States moved to Will Rogers Field, Oklahoma.

The United States echelon was inactivated on 15 January 1944 and the overseas echelon on 20 February 1944.

=== Air Force Reserves ===
The squadron was redesignated the 18th Reconnaissance Squadron (Note: For other US Air Force units that have been named the 18th Reconnaissance Squadron, see 18th Reconnaissance Squadron (disambiguation).) and again activated in 1947 as a reserve unit under Air Defense Command (ADC) at Newark Army Air Base, New Jersey. Its training was supervised by the 114th AAF Base Unit (later the 2231st Air Force Reserve Training Center). It does not appear that the unit was fully manned or equipped.

In 1948 Continental Air Command assumed responsibility for managing reserve units from ADC. The 18th was inactivated when Continental Air Command reorganized its reserve units under the wing base organization system in June 1949. President Truman's reduced 1949 defense budget also required elimination of a number of units in the Air Force, and the 18th was not replaced as reserve flying operations at Newark ceased.

=== Strategic Air Command ===
The 918th Air Refueling Squadron was one of two air refueling squadrons activated in 1960 at Altus Air Force Base, Oklahoma for movement to other bases to provide Boeing KC-135 Stratotanker support to dispersed Boeing B-52 Stratofortress bombers. Cadre and aircraft for the squadron was drawn from the 96th Air Refueling Squadron, which was inactivated The decision to organize squadrons at Altus for movement elsewhere was reversed shortly after the 918th was organized, and the squadron was inactivated and its personnel and aircraft were returned to the 96th, which was reactivated.

In September 1985, the 18th Reconnaissance Squadron and the 918th Air Refueling Squadron were consolidated into a single unit under the name 918th Air Refueling Squadron.

== Lineage ==
18th Reconnaissance Squadron

- Constituted as 18th Photographic Mapping Squadron on 14 July 1942

Activated on 23 July 1942
Redesignated 18th Photographic Squadron (Heavy) on 6 February 1943
Redesignated 18th Combat Mapping Squadron on 9 October 1943
Inactivated on 20 February 1944

- Redesignated 18th Reconnaissance Squadron, Photographic on 8 October 1947 and allotted to the reserve

Activated on 6 November 1947
Inactivated on 27 June 1949

- Consolidated with the 918th Air Refueling Squadron as 918th Air Refueling Squadron on 19 September 1985 (remained inactive)

918th Air Refueling Squadron

- Constituted as 918th Air Refueling Squadron, Heavy on 20 May 1960 and activated (not organized)

Organized on 1 October 1960
Discontinued and inactivated on 15 December 1960

- Consolidated with the 18th Reconnaissance Squadron on 19 September 1985 (remained inactive)

=== Assignments ===
- 4th Photographic Group (later Photographic Reconnaissance and Mapping Group, Photographic Group), 23 July 1942 – 20 February 1944

Air echelon assigned to the 8th Photographic Reconnaissance Group, 9 October 1943 – 15 January 1944

- 66th Strategic Reconnaissance Group, 6 November 1947 – 27 June 1949
- 11th Bombardment Wing, 1 October 1960 – 15 December 1950

=== Stations ===
- Colorado Springs Army Air Base, Colorado, 23 July 1942 – 12 December 1942 (the bulk of air echelon remained at Colorado Springs until 12 October 1943, then moved to Will Rogers Field, Oklahoma, where it was inactivated on 15 January 1944)
- Plaine Des Gaiacs Airfield, New Caledonia, 20 January 1943 – 25 January 1943
- Luganville Airfield, Espiritu Santo, 2 February 1943 – 20 February 1944 (a detachment of the air echelon was at Luganville after 4 April 1943)
- Newark Army Air Base, New Jersey, 6 November 1947 – 27 June 1949
- Altus Air Force Base, Oklahoma, 1 October 1960 – 15 December 1960

=== Aircraft ===
- Lockheed F-5 Lightning, 1942
- North American B-25 Mitchell, 1943–1944
- Consolidated B-24 Liberator, 1943
- Boeing KC-135A Stratotanker, 1960

=== Service streamer ===
| Service Streamer | Campaign | Dates | Notes |
|---|---|---|---|
| | Asiatic-Pacific Theater without inscription | 20 January 1943 – 15 February 1944 | 18th Combat Mapping Squadron |

== See also ==
- List of United States Air Force air refueling squadrons
- B-24 Liberator units of the United States Army Air Forces
- List of P-38 Lightning operators
