= 38th Reconnaissance Squadron (disambiguation) =

The 38th Reconnaissance Squadron is an active United States Air Force Unit, originally constituted as the 38th Pursuit Squadron in November 1940. It was designated the 38th Reconnaissance Squadron, Very Long Range (Mapping) from March 1947 to July 1949. It has held its present designation since September 1991.

38th Reconnaissance Squadron may also refer to:

- The 427th Reconnaissance Squadron, designated the 38th Reconnaissance Squadron from September 1936 to December 1939, 38th Reconnaissance Squadron (Long Range) from December 1939 to November 1940 and 38th Reconnaissance Squadron (Heavy) from November 1940 to April 1942.
- The 38th Reconnaissance Squadron (Bombardment), active from April 1943 to September 1943, but apparently never fully manned or equipped.

== See also ==
- The 38th Photographic Reconnaissance Squadron
- The 38th Strategic Reconnaissance Squadron
- The 38th Tactical Reconnaissance Squadron
