= James Hildreth (disambiguation) =

James Hildreth (born 1984) is an English cricketer.

James Hildreth may also refer to:

- James R. Hildreth (born 1927), United States Air Force general
- James E. K. Hildreth (born 1956), American immunologist and academic administrator
