= Thomas C. Waskow =

US Air Force officer (born 1947)

Lieutenant General Thomas Calvert Waskow
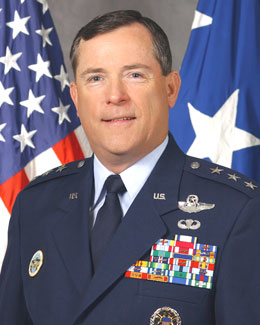
- Lieutenant General Thomas C. Waskow, USAF, c. 2001
- Born: November 24, 1947; Washington, DC, US
- Alma mater: United States Air Force Academy (BS); Central Michigan University (MS)
- Spouse: Sheila Waskow
- Military career
- Allegiance: United States
- Branch: United States Air Force
- Service years: 1970–2005
- Rank: Lieutenant general
- Commands: United States Forces Japan; 5th Air Force; 13th Air Force; 42nd Air Base Wing; 550th Tactical Fighter Squadron
- Awards: Defense Distinguished Service Medal; Air Force Distinguished Service Medal; Defense Superior Service Medal (3); Legion of Merit; Distinguished Flying Cross with "V" Device (3); Defense Meritorious Service Medal; Meritorious Service Medal (3); Air Medal (13); Army Commendation Medal

Thomas C. Waskow is a retired United States Air Force (USAF) lieutenant general who last served as Commander, United States Forces Japan and Commander, 5th Air Force from November 2001 to April 2005. During that assignment, he was the senior U.S. military representative in Japan and Commander of U.S. Air Force units in Japan.

Waskow received his commission upon graduation from the U.S. Air Force Academy in 1970, and he served as a forward air controller and instructor pilot early in his career. During the Vietnam War, he was assigned as a forward air controller at Ban Me Thout and Tan Son Nhut, South Vietnam, where he flew 282 combat missions over South Vietnam and Cambodia. Selected to fly the F-15 Eagle early in its operational deployment, he has flown all models and variants of the air-to-air F-15. He has held command at all levels—fighter squadron, wing and numbered air force. Prior to assuming his final position, he was director of air and space operations, Headquarters Pacific Air Forces. On September 11, 2001, he was designated the Area Air Defense Commander for the Hawaii Air Defense Region and was responsible for the air sovereignty of the state of Hawaii.

Waskow is a command pilot with more than 4,700 flying hours, including 904 combat hours and more than 2,200 hours in the F-15 Eagle. In addition to significant combat experience in Vietnam, Waskow commanded the 42nd Air Base Wing at Maxwell Air Force Base. Waskow contributed extensively to contingency operations Deny Flight and Silver Wake in the Balkans, Noble Eagle in Hawaii in 2001, and Unified Assistance in Japan in 2005.

== Education ==
- 1970 Bachelor of Science degree in aeronautical engineering, U.S. Air Force Academy, Colorado Springs, Colorado
- 1978 Master of Science degree in business, Central Michigan University, Mount Pleasant
- 1985 Air War College, Maxwell Air Force Base, Alabama
- 1987 National War College, Fort Lesley J. McNair, Washington, D.C.
- 1988 Senior Executive Fellow, Harvard University, Cambridge, Massachusetts
- 1988 Seminar XXI Fellow, Massachusetts Institute of Technology, Cambridge

== Military assignments ==
- July 1970 – November 1971, student, undergraduate pilot training, 3576th Student Squadron, Vance Air Force Base, Oklahoma
- November 1971 – December 1972, forward air controller, 21st Tactical Air Support Squadron, Tan Son Nhut Air Base, South Vietnam
- December 1972 – March 1974, instructor pilot, 52nd Flying Training Squadron, Craig Air Force Base, Alabama
- March 1974 – September 1976, class commander and academic instructor, 29th Student Squadron, Craig Air Force Base, Alabama
- September 1976 – July 1977, chief, Social Actions, 29th Flying Training Wing, Craig Air Force Base, Alabama
- July 1977 – April 1979, Air Staff Training Program officer, Deputy Chief of Staff for Plans and Programs, Headquarters U.S. Air Force, Washington, D.C.
- April 1979 – July 1982, F-15A instructor pilot, later, executive officer, flight commander and assistant operations officer, 525th Tactical Fighter Squadron, Bitburg Air Base, West Germany
- July 1982 – June 1983, operations officer, 22nd Tactical Fighter Squadron, Bitburg Air Base, West Germany
- June 1983 – November 1983, F-15 instructor pilot, 555th Tactical Fighter Squadron, Luke Air Force Base, Arizona
- November 1983 – June 1984, F-15 operations officer, 426th Tactical Fighter Training Squadron, Luke Air Force Base, Arizona
- June 1984 – July 1986, commander, 550th Tactical Fighter Squadron, Luke Air Force Base, Arizona
- July 1986 – June 1987, student, National War College, Fort Lesley J. McNair, Washington, D.C.
- June 1987 – July 1989, chief of Long-Range Strategic Plans Branch, J-5, Office of the Joint Chiefs of Staff, the Pentagon, Washington, D.C.
- July 1989 – July 1990, vice commander of 18th Tactical Fighter Wing, Kadena Air Base, Japan
- July 1990 – June 1992, deputy chief of staff for operations, Headquarters 5th Air Force, Yokota Air Base, Japan
- June 1992 – December 1993, special assistant to the Commander of Supreme Headquarters Allied Powers Europe, Belgium
- January 1994 – August 1994, chief of staff, Partnership for Peace Coordination Cell, Mons, Belgium
- August 1994 – May 1996, commander of 42nd Air Base Wing (previously the 502nd Air Base Wing), Maxwell Air Force Base, Alabama
- May 1996 – August 1998, chief of staff, Headquarters Allied Air Forces Southern Europe, Naples, Italy
- August 1998 – May 1999, commander of 13th Air Force, Andersen Air Force Base, Guam
- May 1999 – November 2001, director of air and space operations, Headquarters Pacific Air Forces, Hickam Air Force Base, Hawaii
- November 2001 – April 2005, commander of U.S. Forces Japan, and Commander, 5th Air Force, Yokota Air Base, Japan

== Effective dates of promotion ==
Insignia	Rank	Date of rank
	Second lieutenant	June 3, 1970
	First lieutenant	December 3, 1971
	Captain	December 3, 1973
	Major	September 1, 1979
	Lieutenant colonel	December 1, 1982
	Colonel	May 1, 1988
	Brigadier general	July 15, 1994
	Major general	July 1, 1997
	Lieutenant general	December 1, 2001
