= John W. Sessums Jr. =

Norris B. Harbold
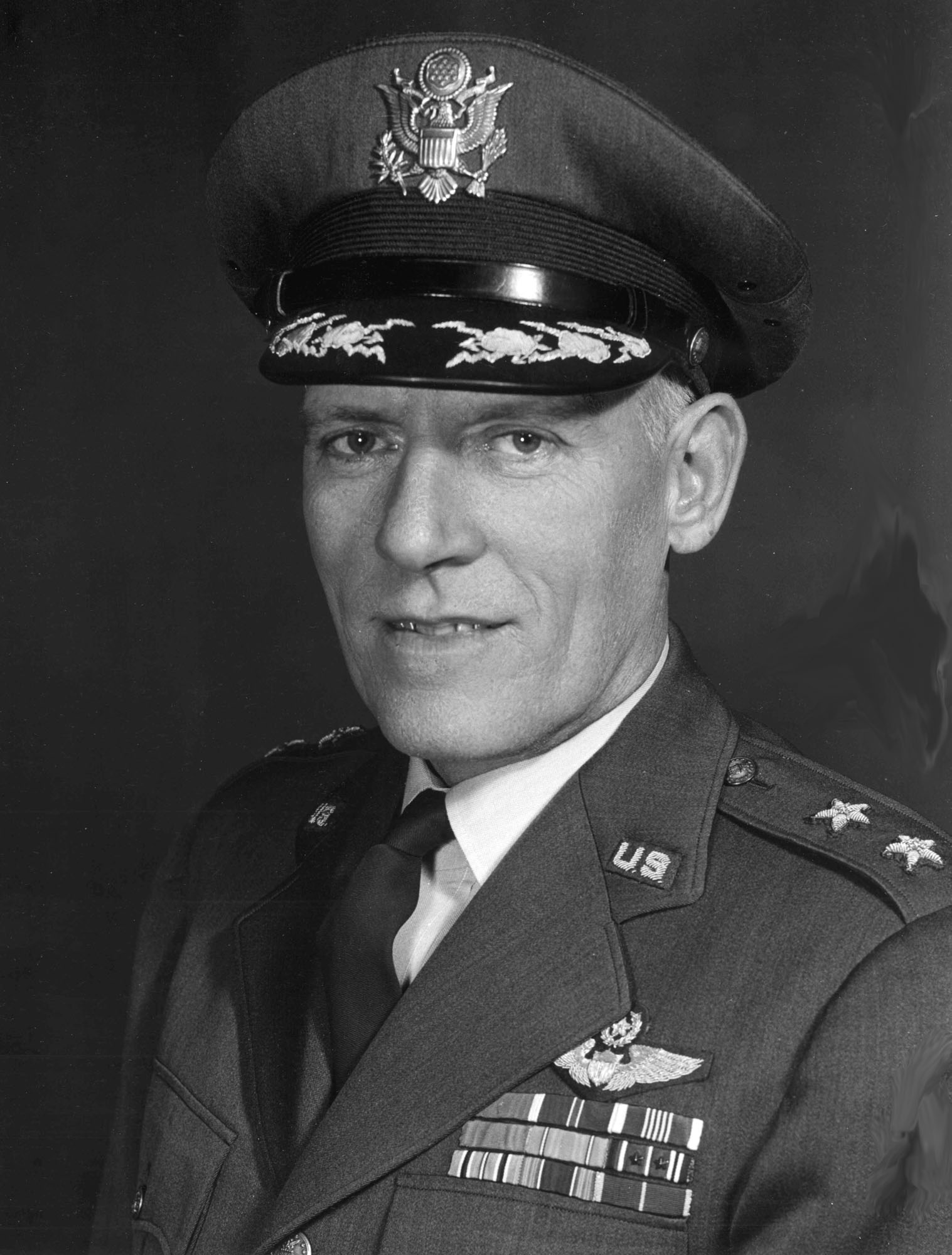
- Military portrait, circa 1950s
- Born: 1904; Little Rock, Arkansas
- Died: 20 July 1989 (age 85); Loma Linda University Medical Center, Loma Linda, California
- Education: University of Tennessee (B.S.); Air Corps Tactical School; National War College
- Military career
- Allegiance: United States
- Branch: Army; Air Force
- Rank: Major General
- Conflicts: World War II
- Awards: Legion of Merit; Bronze Star; Air Medal; Army Commendation

John Walker Sessums Jr. (1904–20 July 1989) was an American major general and business executive.

Sessums's military career began when he became a second lieutenant in the Engineering Reserve in 1926. After being appointed a Flying Cadet in 1928 and graduating from the Army flying school the following year, he was commissioned into the Air Reserve and assigned to active duty as a second lieutenant of the Air Corps. After serving as a pilot and armament officer at Maxwell Field in Alabama, Sessums served as an aide-de-camp to Major General Preston Brown at Quarry Heights in the Panama Canal Zone. He entered the Air Corps Engineering School in late 1934, and after graduating in June 1935 was assigned to Wright Field in Ohio. He first worked as a project officer, and next as a member of the field commander's staff. In 1935, he commanded the 1st Transportation Squadron. After the United States' entry into World War II, Sessums' role shifted. In 1942 Sessums became a chief of the Aircraft Production Division at the Army Air Forces in Washington, D.C., a position he held for three years. In January 1945, he became chief of plans for the XXII Tactical Air Command stationed in Italy. He flew 22 combat missions for the command. In June 1945, he became chief of staff of the Twelfth Air Force, operating in the Mediterranean Theater. During the course of the war, he also served 23 missions behind enemy lines (including ground missions) and was awarded a Bronze Star for this. In August 1945, Sessums was appointed the assistant chief of Research and Development at the Air Materiel Command at Wright and Patterson Fields near Dayton, Ohio.

Sessums graduated from the National War College in 1947. He served as deputy chief of staff for the Air Staff for Research and Development (1947); deputy director of research and development and chief of staff for Materiel at the headquarters at The Pentagon.

In the late 1950s, he became an executive of the Lockheed Propulsion Company. Sessums helped the city of Redlands, California to secure a loan for the purposes of buying Redlands Municipal Airport and to expand and modernizing it in order to keep it operational. He served on its airport commission for ten years, and was regarded to be the "Father of the Redlands Municipal Airport".

== Early life and education ==
Sessums was born in 1904 in Little Rock, Arkansas. in his youth, he and his family moved to Memphis, Tennessee. Sessums graduated high school in Memphis in 1922. In 1926, he graduated from the University of Tennessee with a bachelor of science.

== Military career ==
=== Early service ===
On 2 June 1926, Sessums as a second lieutenant in the Engineering Reserve (United States Army Corps of Engineers).

Sessums was appointed a flying cadet in June 1928. One year later, he graduated from the Army flying school and was commissioned as a second lieutenant in the Air Reserve (United States Army Reserve) and assigned to active duty. On 4 September 1929, he was given a regular commission as a second lieutenant of the Air Corps. Sessums was first assigned to serve as a pilot and armament officer at Maxwell Field in Alabama.

Sessums served as an aide-de-camp to Major General Preston Brown at Quarry Heights in the Panama Canal Zone.

In 1930, Sessums received a gold medal for winning the National Aerial Gunnery Matches held at Langley Field in Virginia.

In September 1934, Sessums began attending the Air Corps Engineering School. He graduated in June 1935. After this, he was assigned to Wright Field in Ohio. At Wright Field, he first worked as a project officer on aircraft engines and aircraft. He next worked as a member of the staff of the field's commander. In 1935, he commanded the 1st Transportation Squadron.

=== World War II ===
In May 1942, Sessums was transferred to work as a fighter project officer at the headquarters of the Army Air Forces in Washington, D.C.. In April 1942, he became the chief of the Aircraft Production Division at the headquarters. He held this position for three years.

In January 1945, Sessums began serving as chief of plans for the XXII Tactical Air Command stationed in Italy. He flew 22 combat missions for the XXII Tactical Air Command. During World War II, he served 23 missions behind enemy lines, including ground missions. He was awarded a Bronze Star for his ground work behind enemy lines.

In May 1945, Sessums was appointed chief of staff of the XXII Tactical Air Command. In June 1945, he was named chief of staff of the Twelfth Air Force, which was operating in the Mediterranean Theater.

In August 1945, Sessums was appointed the assistant chief of Research and Development at the Air Materiel Command at Wright and Patterson Fields near Dayton, Ohio.

=== Post-war ===
Sessums, circa early 1950s

In August 1946, Sessums began attending the National War College. He graduated in June 1947, and was thereafter appointed vice deputy chief of staff of Air Staff for Research and Development (serving under General Curtis LeMay).

In October 1947, Sessums was named deputy director of Research and Development and chief of staff for Materiel at the headquarters in The Pentagon.

In September 1949, Sessums was designated director of Research and Development at Air Materiel Command headquarters at Wright and Patterson Fields. In February 1951, Sessums was appointed the command's deputy commanding general. In April 1951, became director of operations of the command. In June 1951, the command was moved to Baltimore, Maryland, and Sessums relocated along with it. In August 1951, he was named the command's deputy for development.

Sessums was an early advocate of the development of a more robust ballistic missile program. In 1950, Sessums appeared before the Air Force Scientific Advisory Board to urge this, but was largely disregarded. In September 1951, he wrote Brig. Gen. Donald Norton Yates (Director of Research and Development at Air Force Headquarters) arguing for funding of the Atlas project, writing, "it is feasible to undertake the development of the long-range rocket missile now." Yates replied that Air Force Headquarters did not agree with the rate of development projected by the contractor and wanting revisions. In March 1952, Sessums wrote on behalf of the Air Research and Development Command, "It is urgently recommended that a requirement be established for a long-range ballistic rocket missile," arguing one could (if properly funded and prioritized) be operational by the year 1960.

On 10 October 1952, Sessums assumed the position of commander of the Thirteenth Air Force (located in The Philippines) and also became vice commander of the Air Research and Development Command. As Commander of the Thirteenth Air Force, he aided French forces in the Battle of Dien Bien Phu, and also trained South Korean pilots at facilities in The Philippines. He was relieved from his assignment as the commander of the Thirteenth Air Force in September 1954, being reassigned vice commander of the Air Research and Development Command at Andrews Air Force Base. Sessums served as commander of the Air Research and Development Command twice, first from 1 July to 31 July 1957 and the second time from 10 March to 24 April 1959.

Upon his retirement as a major general, he received numerous honors from the governments of the United States, The Philippines, Thailand, Taiwan (Nationalist China), as well as from the United Nations.

== Later life and career ==
In the late 1950s, Sessums served as chairman of the Lockheed Propulsion Company, which led him to live in Redlands, California. He remained a resident of the Redlands for the last three decades of his life.

While working as chairman of the company, Sessums arranged for a $20,000 loan to be given to the City of Redlands. At the time, the Redlands Municipal Airport was privately owned and, unable to expand its runway, was going to be sold for redevelopment for non-aviation uses. Sessums' intervention enabled the city of Redlands to buy the airport and property that was needed to expand the runway, and fund the modernization of the airport. For this, Sessums was regarded as the "Father of the Redlands Municipal Airport" For ten years, Sessums served as a member of the airport commission, and was thereafter named an honorary life member. He also served to terms on the San Bernardino County Aviation Committee and served as chairman of the Southern California Aviation Council.

In Redlands, Sessums served two terms as the local director for the American Red Cross, and as chairman of a campaign to restore Prospect Park. He also supported the Civil Air Patrol at Norton Air Force Base, and was a board member for Goodwill Industries.

Sessums was also involved in the Redlands Rotary Club and San Gorgonio Arrow Club.

Sessums died of a stroke at the age of 85 on 20 July 1989 at Loma Linda University Medical Center.

== Personal life ==
Sessums had a son, John W. Sessums III, and two daughters, Marion and Jean.

== Awards and recognition ==
=== Military decorations and medals ===
- Legion of Merit (2)
- Bronze Star Medal
- Air Medal
- Army Commendation Ribbon

=== Civilian honors ===
- Commander of the Order of the British Empire
- Order of the Crown of Thailand, Second Class
- Philippine Legion of Honor
- conferred an honorary doctor of science degree by Adamson University on 20 March 1954.
