= 4th Reconnaissance Group =

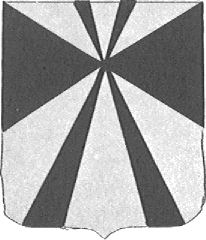
- Emblem of the 4th Reconnaissance Group
- Active: 1942–1946
- Country: United States
- Branch: United States Army Air Forces

The 4th Reconnaissance Group is an inactive United States Air Force unit. It was last assigned to Thirteenth Air Force and was stationed at Clark Field, Philippines. It was inactivated on 15 January 1946.

The unit operated P-38/F-4 Lightning photo-reconnaissance aircraft in the Pacific Theater of World War II over a wide area. The group, based successively on New Caledonia, Espiritu Santo, Guadalcanal, and Morotai, flew reconnaissance missions over enemy territory to supply air force units with target and damage- assessment photographs and to provide army and navy units with intelligence on Japanese troop concentrations, installations, shore defenses, supply routes, and shipping. It also produced maps of Allied and enemy-held territory and prepared navigation charts for US units.

During the last three months of the war the group photographed Japanese positions and installations on Mindanao and Borneo to aid US and Australian operations.

== History ==
=== Lineage ===
- Constituted as 4th Photographic Group on 14 July 1942

Activated on 23 July 1942
Redesignated 4th Photographic Reconnaissance and Mapping Group on 15 May 1943
Redesignated 4th Photographic Group (Reconnaissance) in November 1943
Redesignated 4th Reconnaissance Group on 4 May 1945
Inactivated on 15 January 1946
Disbanded on 6 March 1947

- Reconstituted on 31 July 1985 and redesignated 534th Combat Crew Training Group (not active)

=== Assignments ===
- Second Air Force, 23 July – 24 October 1942
- Thirteenth Air Force, 22 November 1942 – 15 January 1946

=== Components ===
- 17th Photographic Reconnaissance Squadron, 23 July 1942 – 15 January 1946
- 18th Combat Mapping Squadron (1942–46)
- 19th Photographic Reconnaissance Squadron, 23 July 1942 – 15 January 1946
- 20th Reconnaissance Squadron, 23 July 1942 – 15 January 1946
- 38th Photographic Reconnaissance Squadron, 23 July 1942 – 15 January 1946

=== Stations ===
- Colorado Springs AAFd., Colorado 23 July – 24 October 1942
- Plaine Des Gaiacs Airfield, New Caledonia, Melanesia, 22 November 1942
- Pekoa Airfield, Espiritu Santo, New Hebrides, 22 January 1943
- Carney Airfield, Guadalcanal, Solomon Islands, 6 May 1944
- Wama Airfield, Morotai, Netherlands East Indies, 12 December 1944
- Clark Field, Luzon, Philippines, September 1945-15 January 1946

=== Aircraft ===
- F-5 Lightning
- F-10 Mitchell
