= 38th Tactical Reconnaissance Squadron =

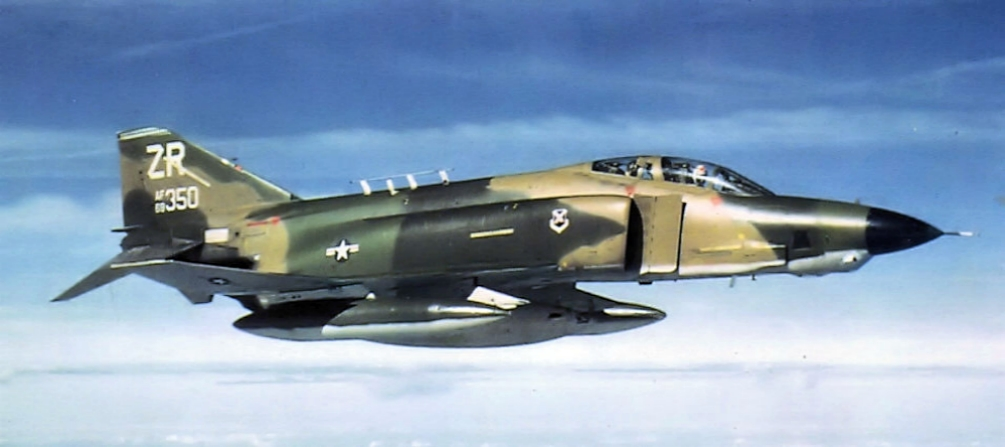
- Squadron RF-4C Phantom II (Note: Aircraft is McDonnell Douglas RF-4C-41-MC Phantom II, serial 69-350, taken in 1975.)
- Active: 1944–1946; 1952–1991
- Country: United States
- Branch: United States Air Force
- Role: tactical reconnaissance
- Engagements: Southwest Pacific Theater
- Decorations: Air Force Outstanding Unit Award; Philippine Presidential Unit Citation

Insignia
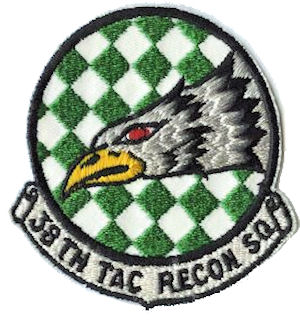
- Patch with 38th Tactical Reconnaissance Squadron emblem

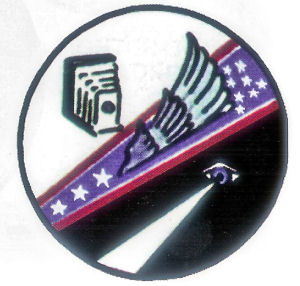
- 38th Tactical Reconnaissance Squadron emblem (Note: Approved 9 December 1953.)

The 38th Tactical Reconnaissance Squadron is an inactive unit of the United States Air Force. Its last assignment was with the 26th Tactical Reconnaissance Wing (26 TRW), stationed at Zweibrücken Air Base, Germany. The squadron deployed to Incirlik Air Base Turkey during Operation DESERT STORM and flew combat operations while assigned to the 7440th Combat Wing. It returned to Zweibrucken after the war and inactivated 3 weeks later.

It was inactivated along with the 26 TRW in mid-1991.

== History ==
=== World War II ===
Established in 1944 as a photo-reconnaissance squadron, the unit trained under the Third Air Force in Oklahoma. It deployed to the Asiatic-Pacific Theater, and was assigned to the Thirteenth Air Force. Using unarmed fighter aircraft (P-38s, later P-51s) and B-25 Mitchell medium bombers fitted with aerial mapping cameras, the squadron performed numerous long distance mapping flights over enemy-held territory, primarily in the Netherlands East Indies and the Philippines. These flights were extremely hazardous, being flown without escort, they obtained intelligence about enemy fortifications, armored units, infantry concentrations and other tactical intelligence.

The squadron was inactivated in January 1946.

=== United States Air Forces in Europe ===
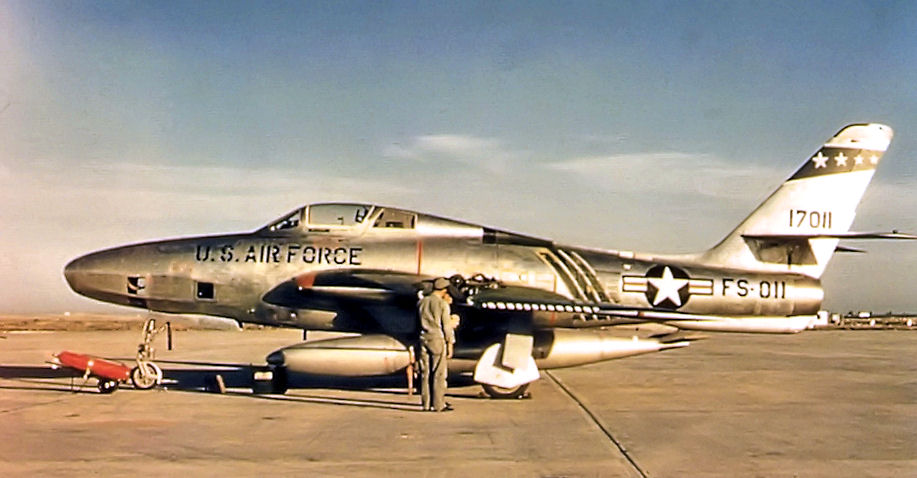
Squadron RF-84F Thunderflash (Note: Aircraft is Republic RF-84F-25-RE Thunderflash, serial 51-17011, taken in 1955.)

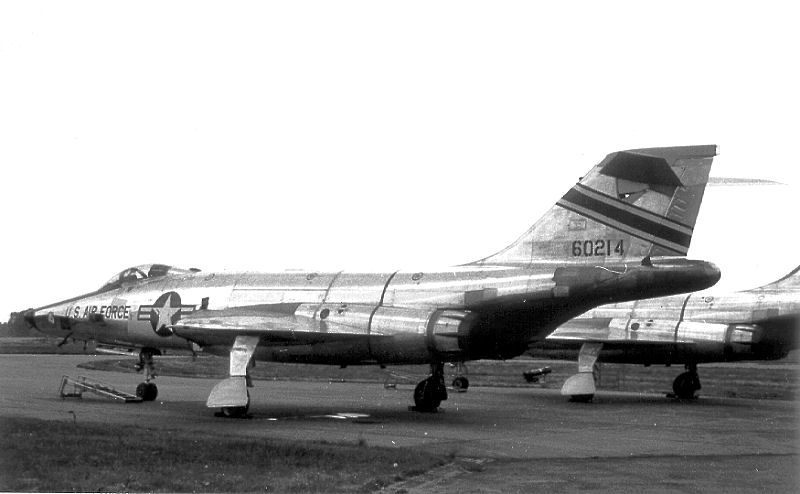
Squadron RF-101C Voodoo (Note: Aircraft is McDonnell RF-101C-55-MC Voodoo, serial 56-214, taken in 1960.)

Reactivated in 1952 as a NATO tactical reconnaissance squadron, it was designated to be based in France as a result of the United States Cold War military buildup in Europe. The unit was activated as a redesignation of the Alabama Air National Guard's 160th Tactical Reconnaissance Squadron, which was federalized and brought to active duty during the Korean War. It was issued with the RF-80A Shooting Star aircraft, and trained for daylight reconnaissance missions. The squadron, however, was stationed at Fürstenfeldbruck Air Base in West Germany due to the uncompleted facilities at Toul-Rosières Air Base. Weather conditions in Germany severely restricted the training operations of the assigned RF-80As. The squadron frequently deployed to Nouasseur Air Base, Morocco during the winter of 1952–53 where the photo conditions were far better.

The squadron moved to Spangdahlem Air Base, West Germany in May 1953 where all of the elements of the parent 10th Tactical Reconnaissance Wing were assembled at one base. It was re-equipped in 1955 with the RF-84F Thunderstreak, as the RF-80s were deemed to be no longer mission-capable against the Soviet MiG-15.

In January 1958, the squadron was moved to Phalsbourg-Bourscheid AB, France while the runway at Spangdahlem was under repair and renovation. In March 1958, it was reassigned to the 66th Tactical Reconnaissance Wing, which was moving to Phalsbourg from Sembach AB also due to poor runway conditions. During May, the Thundersteaks were replaced by McDonnell RF-101C Voodoos, which were the fastest tactical reconnaissance aircraft ever flown by the USAF. The last reconnaissance Voodoos were withdrawn from ANG service in 1979.

Routine training operations were flown from Laon for over seven years. The 38th moved to Ramstein AFB, Germany in 1962 and remained there until it moved to Zweibrucken. In 1965 the squadron was again reassigned to the 26th Tactical Reconnaissance Wing, which was being formed at Toul Air Base. On 7 March 1966, French President General Charles De Gaulle announced that France would withdraw from NATO's military structure but not leave the political organization. He gave NATO forces one year (until 1 April 1967) to depart France.

As a result, the 26 Tactical Reconnaissance Wing was relocated to Ramstein Air Base, West Germany and upgraded to the RF-4C Phantom II. The 38th operated from Ramstein until 1973, when in a NATO realignment, the 26th was reassigned to Zweibrücken Air Base. It remained at Zweibrücken until being inactivated in 1991 after the end of the Cold War, and the phasing-out of the RF-4C.

The squadron was relieved from assignment to the 26 TRW on 1 April 1991, and was probably inactivated as of that date.

== Lineage ==
- Constituted as the 38th Photographic Reconnaissance Squadron on 29 March 1944

Activated 1 May 1944
Inactivated on 15 January 1946

- Redesignated 38th Tactical Reconnaissance Squadron (Photographic) on 25 June 1952

Activated on 10 July 1952
Redesignated 38th Tactical Reconnaissance Squadron c. 1 October 1966
Inactivated c. 31 July 1991

=== Assignments ===
- III Tactical Air Division, 1 May 1944
- Thirteenth Air Force, 2 December 1944

Attached to 4th Photographic Group from 12 December 1944

- 4th Photographic (later Reconnaissance) Group, 1 February 1945
- Thirteenth Air Force, 5 December 1945 – 15 January 1946
- 10th Tactical Reconnaissance Group, 10 July 1952
- 10th Tactical Reconnaissance Wing, 8 December 1957

Attached to the 66th Tactical Reconnaissance Wing from 8 January 1958

- 66th Tactical Reconnaissance Wing, 8 March 1958
- 26th Tactical Reconnaissance Wing, 1 January 1966 – 1 April 1991

=== Stations ===
- Will Rogers Field, Oklahoma, May 1944
- Muskogee Army Airfield, Oklahoma, c. 15 May-2 November 1944
- Hollandia Airfield Complex, Netherlands East Indies, 14 December 1944
- Wama Airfield, Morotai, Netherlands East Indies, 28 December 1944
- Clark Field, Luzon, Philippines, C. 5 October 1945 – 15 January 1946
- Neubiberg Air Base, West Germany, 10 July 1952
- Spangdahlem Air Base, West Germany, 4 May 1953
- Phalsbourg-Bourscheid Air Base, France, 31 July 1957
- Toul-Rosières Air Base, France, 17 October 1960
- Ramstein Air Base, West Germany, 1 October 1966
- Zweibrücken Air Base, West Germany, 31 January 1973 – 31 July 1991

=== Aircraft ===
- B-25 Mitchell, 1944
- P-38/F-5 Lightning, 1944, 1945
- RF-80 Shooting Star, 1952–1956
- RF-84F Thunderflash, 1955–1958
- RF-101 Voodoo, 1958–1965
- RF-4C Phantom II, 1965–1991
