= Edward A. Rice Jr. =

United States Air Force general

Edward A. Rice, Jr.
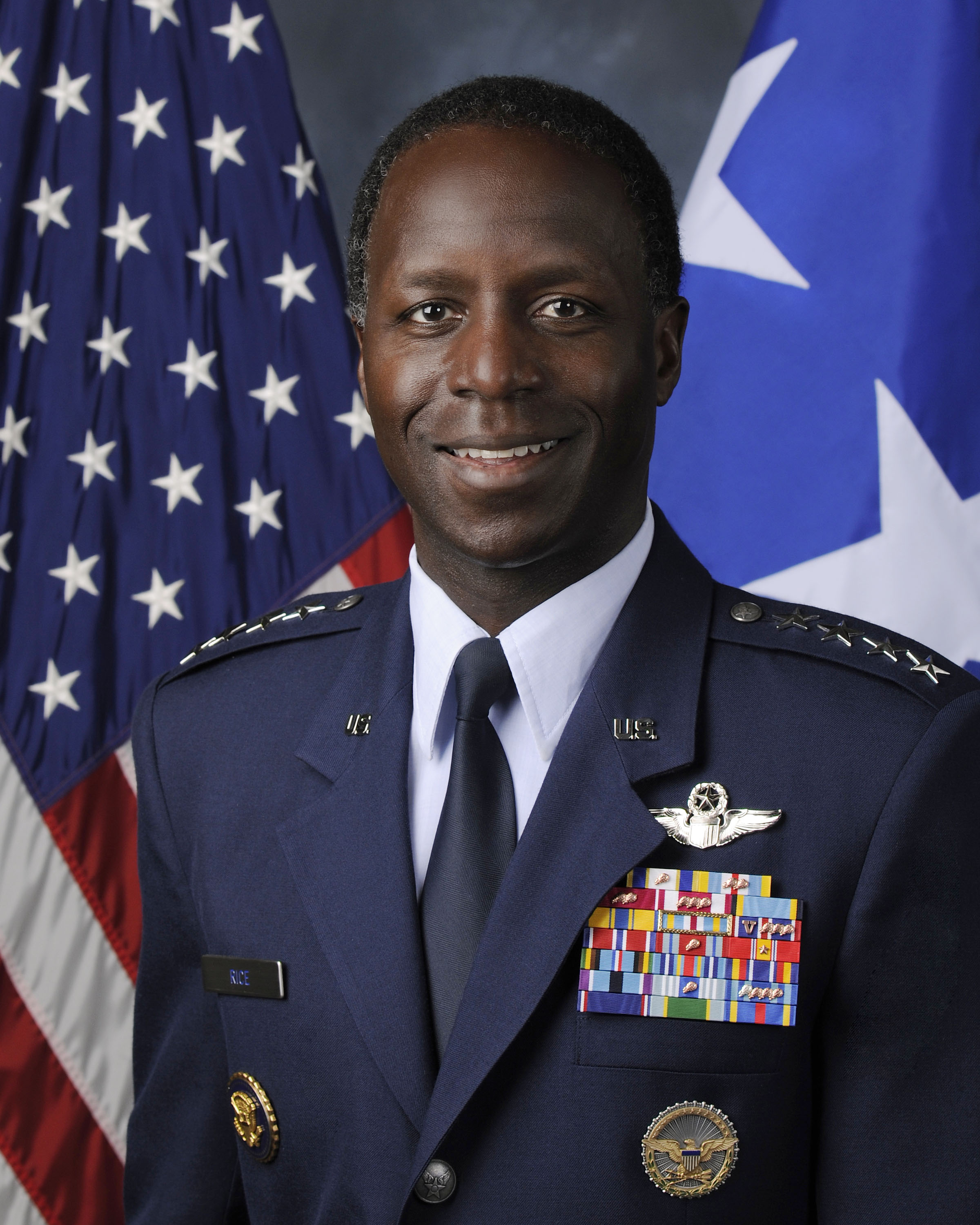
- General Edward A. Rice, Jr.
- Born: March 31, 1956 (age 70); Albuquerque, New Mexico
- Military career
- Allegiance: United States
- Branch: United States Air Force
- Service years: 1978–2013
- Rank: General
- Commands: Air Education and Training Command; United States Forces Japan; Fifth Air Force; Thirteenth Air Force; 28th Bomb Wing; 552nd Operations Group; 34th Bomb Squadron
- Awards: Air Force Distinguished Service Medal (3); Defense Superior Service Medal (3); Legion of Merit (3)

Edward Augustus Rice Jr. (born March 31, 1956) is a retired four-star general of the United States Air Force who served as the 30th Commander of the Air Education and Training Command (AETC). As commander, he was responsible for the recruiting, training and education of all United States airmen. His command included the Air Force Recruiting Service, two numbered air forces and Air University. Air Education and Training Command consists of 12 bases, more than 70,600 active duty, reserve, guard, civilians and contractors, and 1,380 trainer, fighter and mobility aircraft. He relinquished command of AETC to General Robin Rand on October 10, 2013.

Rice previously served as Commander United States Forces Japan and Fifth Air Force, Vice Commander, Pacific Air Forces, Commander, Thirteenth Air Force, and Commander, Kenney Headquarters (P), Hickam AFB, Hawaii until October 2006. He served as a White House Fellow at the Department of Health and Human Services, as a professional staff member for the Commission on Roles and Missions of the Armed Forces, and as the Deputy Executive Secretary for the National Security Council. He received the Air Force Distinguished Service Medal, the Defense Superior Service Medal, the Legion of Merit, and others.

== Education ==
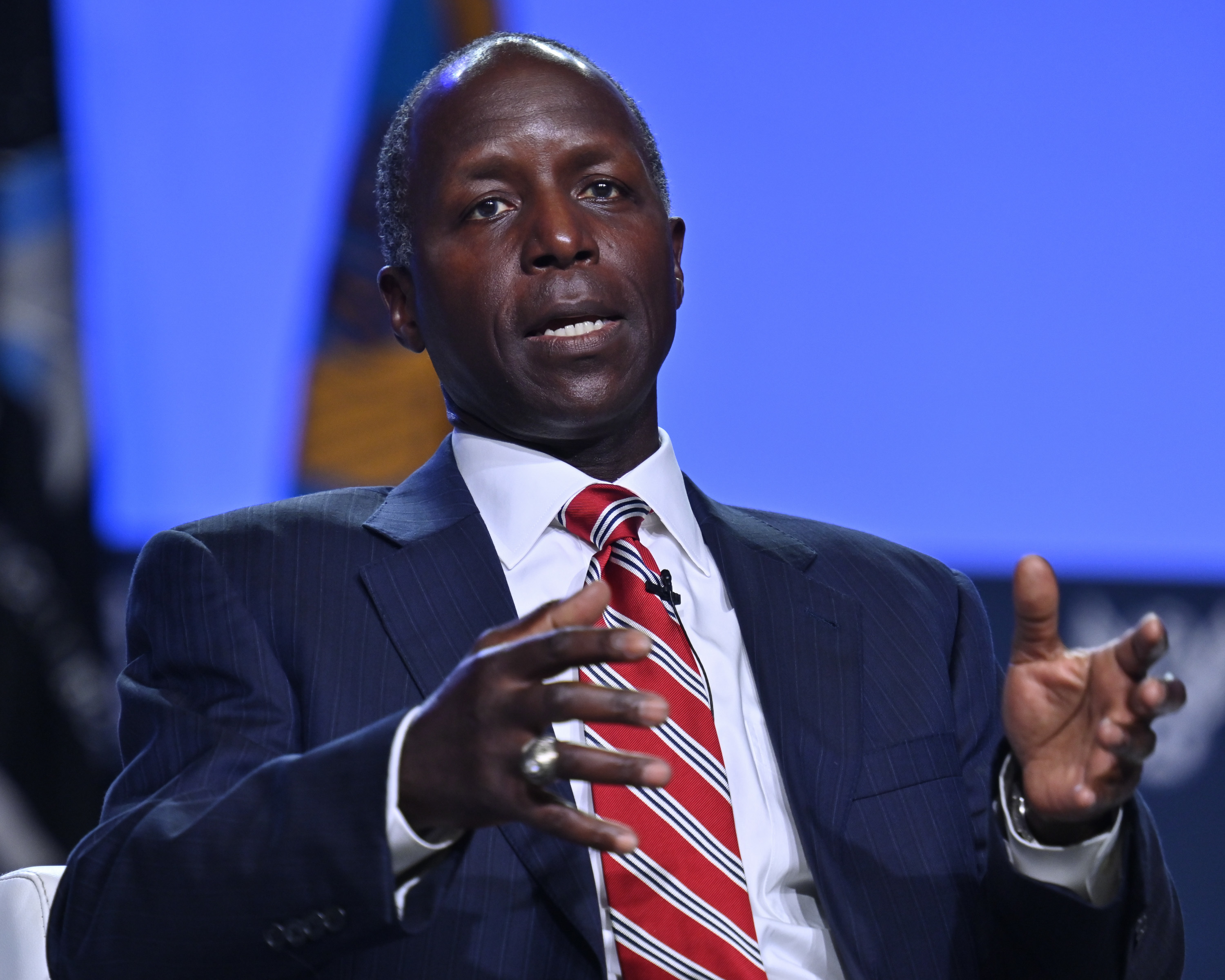
A retired Rice makes remarks during the “It’s All About People” panel discussion at the 2021 Air Force Association Air, Space and Cyber Conference on September 22, 2021.

Born in New Mexico on March 31, 1956, and raised in Yellow Springs, Ohio, Rice is a 1978 distinguished United States Air Force Academy graduate where he earned a Bachelor of Science degree. In 2006, he attended a Joint Force Maritime Component Commander Course, Naval War College at Newport, Rhode Island

Rice has flown more than 3,900 flying hours as a pilot in the B-1 Lancer, B-52 Stratofortress, E-3 Sentry, B-2 Spirit, KC-135 Stratotanker, C-130 Hercules, T-37 Tweet and T-38 Talon.

== Military assignments ==
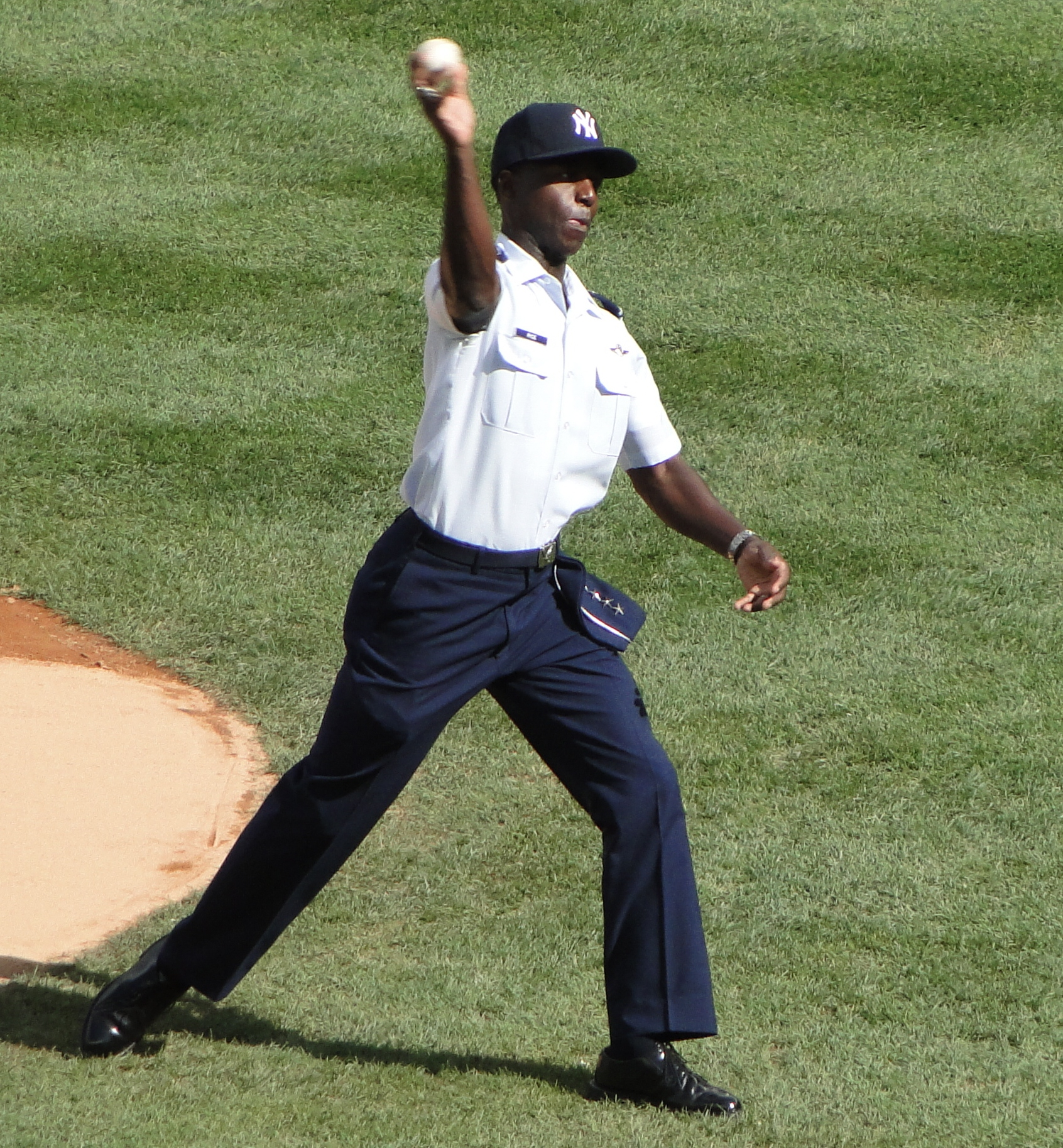
Gen. Rice Jr. throws out the first pitch at Yankee Stadium.

- July 1978 – February 1980, distinguished graduate, undergraduate pilot training, Williams AFB, Arizona
- February 1980 – January 1984, B-52G co-pilot and aircraft commander, 69th Bombardment Squadron, Loring AFB, Maine
- January 1984 – February 1985, Air Staff Training Program assistant deputy chief, Executive Services Division, Directorate of Administration, Headquarters U.S. Air Force, Washington, D.C.
- February 1985 – July 1988, B-52G instructor pilot; Chief, Standardization and Evaluation Branch; and flight commander, 441st Bombardment Squadron, Mather AFB, California
- July 1988 – July 1989, student, College of Naval Command and Staff, Naval War College, Newport, Rhode Island
- July 1989 – August 1990, programmer, Air Crew Management Branch, Deputy Chief of Staff for Air and Space Operations, Headquarters U.S. Air Force, Washington, D.C.
- August 1990 – November 1991, White House Fellow, Department of Health and Human Services, Washington, D.C.
- November 1991 – July 1992, Chief, Standardization and Evaluation Division, 410th Operations Group, K.I. Sawyer AFB, Michigan
- July 1992 – August 1993, Commander, 34th Bomb Squadron, Castle AFB, California
- August 1993 – July 1994, National Security Fellow, John F. Kennedy School of Government, Harvard University, Cambridge, Massachusetts
- July 1994 – July 1995, professional staff member, Commission on Roles and Missions of the Armed Forces, Office of the Secretary of Defense, Washington, D.C.
- July 1995 – January 1996, Deputy Commander, 509th Operations Group, Whiteman AFB, Missouri
- January 1996 – June 1997, Commander, 552nd Operations Group, Tinker AFB, Oklahoma
- June 1997 – June 1999, Deputy Executive Secretary, National Security Council, the White House, Washington, D.C.
- June 1999 – May 2000, deputy director for Expeditionary Aerospace Force Implementation, Deputy Chief of Staff for Air and Space Operations, Headquarters U.S. Air Force, Washington, D.C.
- May 2000 – May 2002, Commander, 28th Bomb Wing, Ellsworth AFB, South Dakota
- May 2002 – January 2004, Commander, Air Force Recruiting Service, Headquarters Air Education and Training Command, Randolph AFB, Texas
- January 2004 to December 2004, Chief of Staff for the Office of the Representative and executive director for the Coalition Provisional Authority, Office of the Secretary of Defense, Washington, D.C.
- January 2005 to September 2005, Commander, 13th Air Force, Andersen AFB, Guam
- September 2005 to July 2006: Director of Air, Space and Information Operations, Plans and Requirements, Headquarters Pacific Air Forces, and Commander, 13th Air Force, Hickam AFB, Hawaii
- July 2006 to October 2006: Commander, 13th Air Force, and Commander, Kenney Headquarters (P), Hickam AFB, Hawaii
- October 2006 to February 2008: Vice Commander, Pacific Air Forces, Hickam AFB, Hawaii
- February 2008 – October 2010, Commander, U.S. Forces Japan, and Commander, 5th Air Force, Yokota Air Base, Japan
- November 2010 – 2014, Commander, Air Education and Training Command, Joint Base San Antonio-Randolph, Texas

== Awards and decorations ==
US Air Force Command Pilot Badge
Office of the Secretary of Defense Identification Badge
Presidential Service Badge

Air Force Distinguished Service Medal with two bronze oak leaf clusters
Defense Superior Service Medal with two bronze oak leaf clusters
Legion of Merit with two bronze oak leaf clusters
Meritorious Service Medal with three bronze oak leaf cluster
Aerial Achievement Medal
Air Force Commendation Medal
Joint Meritorious Unit Award
Air Force Outstanding Unit Award with Valor device & three bronze oak leaf clusters
Air Force Organizational Excellence Award
Combat Readiness Medal with bronze oak leaf clusters
National Defense Service Medal with bronze service star
Armed Forces Expeditionary Medal
Global War on Terrorism Expeditionary Medal
Global War on Terrorism Service Medal
Humanitarian Service Medal
Air Force Overseas Long Tour Service Ribbon with bronze oak leaf cluster
Air Force Expeditionary Service Ribbon with gold frame
Air Force Longevity Service Award with silver and three bronze oak leaf cluster
Air Force Recruiter Ribbon
Small Arms Expert Marksmanship Ribbon
Air Force Training Ribbon
Order of the Rising Sun, 1st Class, Grand Cordon

- 2007 Joseph A. Moller Trophy, Air Combat Command.
