= Freddie L. Poston =

Lieutenant General of US Air Force (1925–2016)

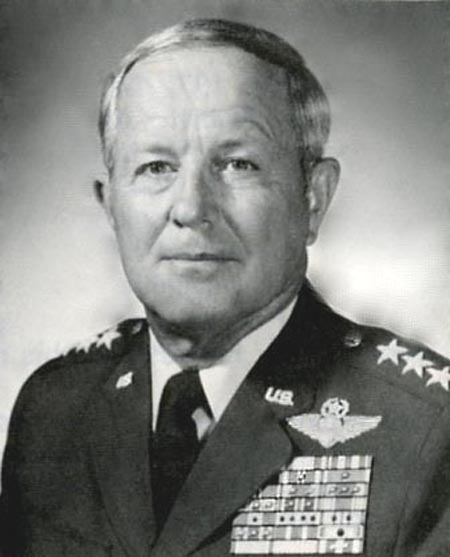
- Born: September 16, 1925; Jacksonville, Florida
- Died: November 18, 2016 (aged 91); Pleasant View, Utah
- Military career
- Allegiance: United States of America
- Branch: United States Air Force
- Service years: 1943–1981
- Rank: Lieutenant General
- Commands: Chief of Staff, United States Pacific Command
- Awards: Distinguished Service Medal, Silver Star, Legion of Merit with oak leaf cluster, Distinguished Flying Cross with oak leaf cluster, Bronze Star Medal, Air Medal with 14 oak leaf clusters and Air Force Commendation Medal with three oak leaf clusters

Freddie Lee Poston (September 16, 1925 – November 18, 2016) was an American lieutenant general who was chief of staff at United States Pacific Command, Camp H. M. Smith, Hawaii. Poston is responsible to the commander in chief Pacific for management of key military staff activities requiring coordinated Air Force, Navy, Army and Marine Corps operations throughout the Pacific Command. The Pacific Command is the United States' largest unified command, encompassing some 100 million square miles from the West Coast of the Americas to the east coast of Africa and from the arctic to the Antarctic.

Poston was born in 1925, in Jacksonville, Florida. He graduated from the Air Command and Staff College at Maxwell Air Force Base, Alabama, in 1962 and the National War College, Fort Lesley J. McNair, Washington, D.C., in 1970.

His military service began in February 1943 when he enlisted in the U.S. Army Air Forces as an aviation cadet. He received his pilot wings and commission as a second lieutenant in March 1945. He then attended combat crew fighter and gunnery training at Victoria, Texas, until his release from active duty in October 1945.

He was recalled to active duty in October 1950, and in March 1951 was sent to Korea where he flew 100 combat missions with the 8th Fighter-Bomber Wing.

He joined the 31st Fighter Wing at Turner Air Force Base, Georgia, in 1952 and served as a pilot and squadron operations officer. During that tour of duty he participated in two overseas deployments that pioneered the use of in-flight refueling by tanker aircraft to facilitate long-range jet fighter movements.

In August 1958, Poston went to Germany where he served in the Directorate of Flight Safety at Headquarters U.S. Air Forces in Europe and later at Headquarters Seventeenth Air Force at Ramstein Air Base as director of flight safety. He returned to the United States in September 1961 to attend the Air Command and Staff College. From there, he was assigned to Headquarters Tactical Air Command at Langley Air Force Base, Va., as a staff officer in the Directorate of Operations.

In July 1965 Poston returned to the 31st Fighter Wing which had moved to Homestead Air Force Base, Fla. His duty assignment was commander of the 309th Tactical Fighter Squadron and, in that capacity, he went with the wing to Tuy Hoa Air Base, Republic of Vietnam, in December 1966. During his year there he flew 225 combat missions in F-100 fighters.

Poston was assigned to the Directorate of Operations, Headquarters, United States Air Force, Washington, D.C., in December 1967 as chief of the Weapons Systems Branch in the Tactical Division.

He entered the National War College in August 1969. In July 1970 Poston was assigned to Luke Air Force Base, Arizona, as director of operations for the 58th Tactical Fighter Wing and then became commander of the 57th Tactical Fighter Weapons Wing at Nellis Air Force Base, Nev., in February 1971.

He transferred to the U.S. Strike Command at MacDill Air Force Base, Florida, in June 1972. He served as deputy director of operations and participated in many significant actions associated with development of joint tactics, techniques and procedures for worldwide deployment and use of Army and Air Force general purpose forces. He also directed the deployment and use of joint forces during field training exercises throughout the United States.

In September 1974 Poston was appointed deputy chief of staff, plans and operations, Headquarters Pacific Air Forces, Hickam Air Force Base, Hawaii. He became deputy chief of staff, operations and intelligence, in July 1975. In these capacities he directed all Air Force operations in the Pacific during a critical period that included the fall of the Republic of Vietnam and the "Mayaguez" incident. In addition he played a major role in improving Air Force capability to respond to a Korean contingency and was the catalyst in developing the Pacific Air Forces ongoing training program at Clark Air Base, Philippines. He remained at Headquarters Pacific Air Forces until he was named commander of Thirteenth Air Force, Clark Air Base, in October 1976. He assumed his current duties in May 1979.

His military decorations and awards include the Distinguished Service Medal, Silver Star, Legion of Merit with oak leaf cluster, Distinguished Flying Cross with oak leaf cluster, Bronze Star Medal, Air Medal with 14 oak leaf clusters and Air Force Commendation Medal with three oak leaf clusters.

Poston was promoted to lieutenant general June 1, 1979, with the same date of rank. He retired August 1, 1981 and died on November 18, 2016, at the age of 91.
