= 18th Reconnaissance Squadron (disambiguation) =

18th Reconnaissance Squadron may refer to:

- The 18th Attack Squadron, designated the 18th Reconnaissance Squadron from April 2006 to May 2016.
- The 908th Air Refueling Squadron, designated the 18th Reconnaissance Squadron, 18th Reconnaissance Squadron (Medium Range), and 18th Reconnaissance Squadron (Medium) from September 1936 to April 1942.
- The 18th Reconnaissance Squadron (Bombardment) active from April 1943 to August 1943.
- The 918th Air Refueling Squadron, designated the 18th Reconnaissance Squadron, Photographic from November 1947 to June 1949.

== See also ==
- The 18th Tactical Reconnaissance Squadron
