= Redlands Municipal Airport =

- IATA: none; ICAO: KREI; FAA LID: REI

Summary
- Airport type: Public
- Owner: City of Redlands
- Location: Redlands, California
- Elevation AMSL: 1,571 ft (479 m)
- Coordinates: 34°05′07″N 117°08′47″W

Map
- Location within California Location within the United States

Runways
Direction	Length		Surface
Direction	ft	m	Surface
8/26	4,505	1,373	Asphalt

Redlands Municipal Airport (ICAO: KREI) is two miles (3.2 km) northeast of downtown Redlands, serving San Bernardino County, United States. This general aviation airport covers 194 acres (79 ha) and has one runway.

== History ==
The Redlands area witnessed some of the nation's earliest general aviation activity. The first recorded air meet held in the Redlands area (sponsored by the University of Redlands) was in 1911. In 1916, Beryl Williams founded the Redlands Aircraft Company in the town. He is remembered for painting his biplane in light blue paint, hoping to render it invisible from the ground.

In 1947 Robert Kanaga and Austin Welch built the Redlands Flying Inn Airport (including a 3,500-foot (1,100 m) runway, a maintenance shop, and a hangar), which marked the first official airport for the city. Kanaga was called for military duty during the Korean War, and the duo offered to sell the airport to the city. The sale was not concluded, since the city did not have the necessary funds available, so the property was purchased by the Southern California Turkey Growers Association; who used the property as a turkey and chicken ranch. In the late 1950s, Roy Haskins and Alexander Theos purchased the turkey ranch, and began to refurbish the buildings to restore it as an aviation facility.

== Current use ==
The airport has a fixed-base operator with a fueling station, flight training schools, and various aircraft repair and refurbishing establishments. Redlands is also home to EAA Chapter 845, an active chapter. The Redlands Airport Association, formed in June 2014, is dedicated to the preservation and promotion of Redlands Airport.

== Airline service ==
In the 1970s two airlines flew to Redlands from Los Angeles: Hughes Airwest Fairchild F-27s and Golden West Airlines de Havilland Canada DHC-6 Twin Otters.

== See also ==
- John W. Sessums Jr. — dubbed the "father" of the airport
