= Dennis R. Larsen =

United States Air Force general

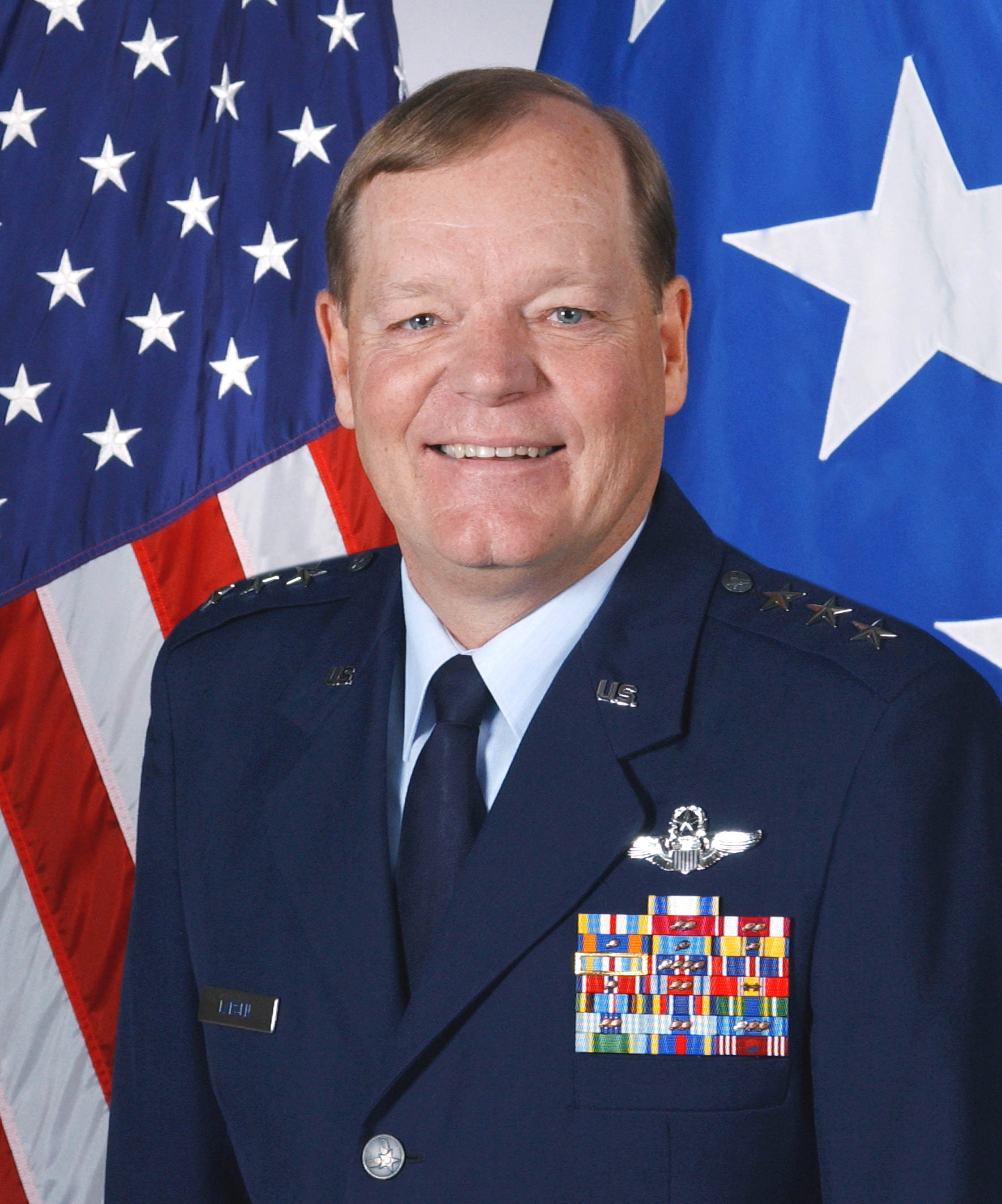
- Military career
- Allegiance: United States of America
- Branch: United States Air Force
- Service years: 1971–2007
- Rank: Lieutenant general
- Commands: 49th Fighter Wing; 363d Air Expeditionary Wing; Thirteenth Air Force; Air Education and Training Command (Vice Commander)

Dennis R. Larsen is a retired lieutenant general in the United States Air Force.

== Career ==
Larsen joined the Air Force in 1971. His commands included the 49th Fighter Wing, the 363d Air Expeditionary Wing, and the Thirteenth Air Force. In 2005 he was named Vice Commander of the Air Education and Training Command. His retirement was effective as of September 1, 2007.

Awards he has received include the Air Force Distinguished Service Medal with oak leaf cluster, the Defense Superior Service Medal, the Legion of Merit with two oak leaf clusters, the Meritorious Service Medal with two oak leaf clusters, the Air Medal with oak leaf cluster, the Aerial Achievement Medal with oak leaf cluster, the Air Force Commendation Medal with oak leaf cluster, the Combat Readiness Medal with two oak leaf clusters, the Armed Forces Expeditionary Medal, the Global War on Terrorism Service Medal, and the Korea Defense Service Medal.

== Education ==
- University of Wisconsin-Platteville
- Squadron Officer School
- University of Southern California
- Air Command and Staff College
- Air War College
