= Plaine Des Gaiacs Airfield =

Airfield on New Caledonia, South Pacific

- Part of Thirteenth Air Force

Site information
- Type: Military airfield
- Controlled by: United States Army Air Forces

Location
- Coordinates: 21°15′4.97″S 164°55′19.61″E

Site history
- Built: 1930s
- In use: 1942-1944

Plaine Des Gaiacs Airfield is a former World War II airfield on New Caledonia in the South Pacific. It is located at Plaine Des Gaiacs near the village of Pouembout. The airfield was also known as De Gaiacs and was named for the Gaiac tree that grow in the area.

After being used as a wartime airfield, it was abandoned and today is almost totally returned to its natural state.

== History ==
Plaine Des Gaiacs Airfield was built in the 1930s by the French colonists. After the fall of France in 1940, the Free French took control of the field. The airfield was expanded into two massive sealed runways by the US Army. It was initially used as a command and control base, then later becoming a staging and training base for aircraft bound for Australia or north to the New Hebrides combat zones.

USAAF units assigned were:

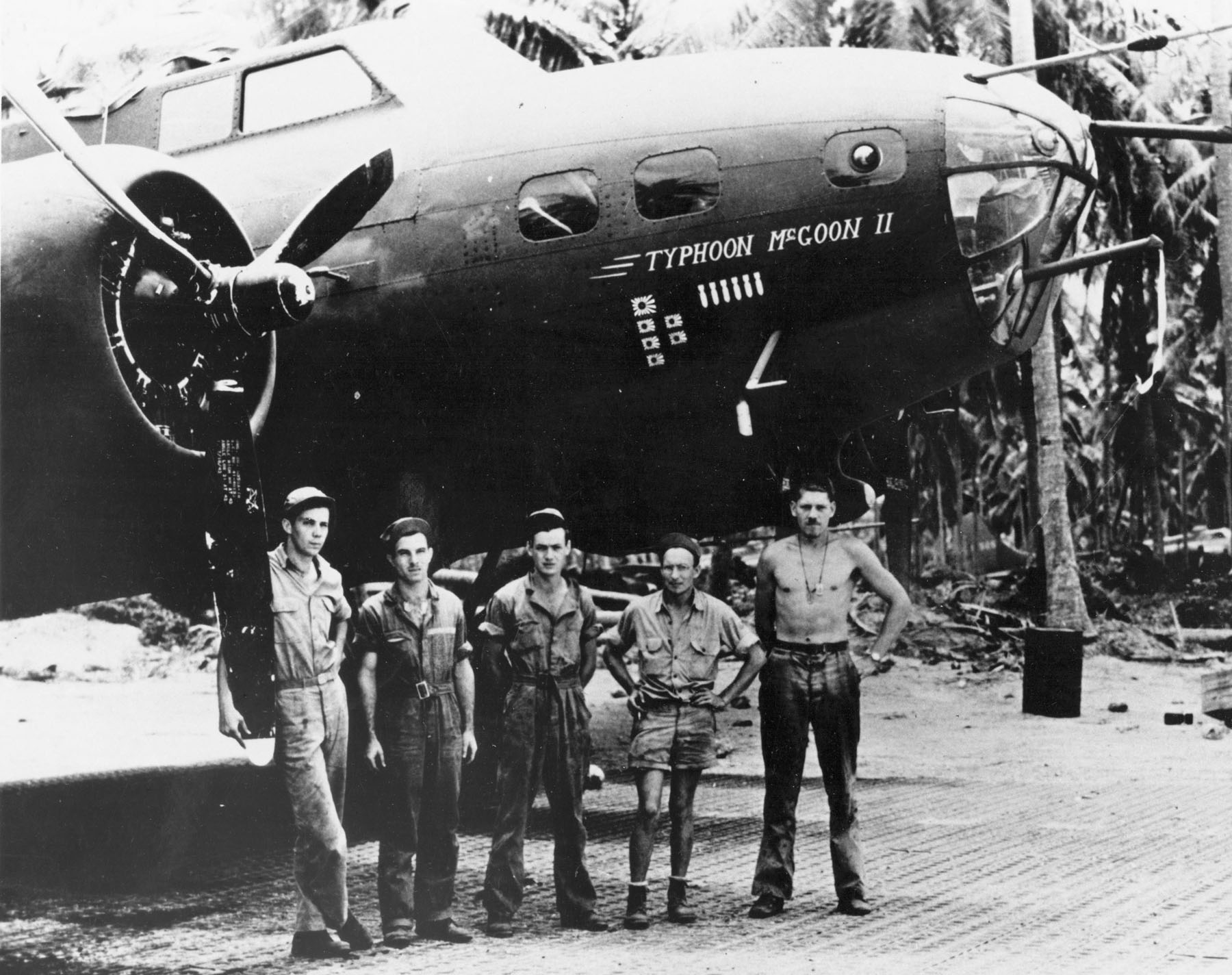
B-17E #41-9211 of the 98th Bombardment Squadron at Plaine Des Gaiacs in January 1943

- 13th Troop Carrier Squadron, 9 October 1942 - 17 December 1942
- Headquarters, Thirteenth Air Force, 13–21 January 1943
- Headquarters, XIII Fighter Command, 13–22 January 1943
- 11th Bombardment Group (Heavy), 22 July 1942 – 23 November 1942
- 42d Bombardment Group (Medium), 20 October 1943 – 20 January 1944
- 347th Fighter Group, 3 October 1943 – 29 December 1943
- 4th Reconnaissance Group, 22 November 1942 – 23 January 1943

The Royal New Zealand Air Force No. 9 Squadron operating Lockheed Hudson was based at Plaine Des Gaiacs from July 1942 until March 1943.

=== Postwar ===
The airfield was closed after the war and fell into disuse. Today it is overgrown with vegetation; the runways are still visible from the air and many small traces of the American occupation remain, such as fuel drums, metal, etc.

== See also ==
- USAAF in the South Pacific
- Naval Base Nepoui
