= James R. Hildreth =

United States Air Force general (1927–2022)

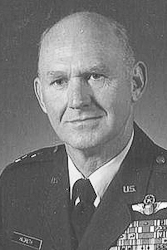
- Born: May 4, 1927; Pine Bluff, Arkansas, U.S.
- Died: February 1, 2022 (aged 94); Spring Hope, North Carolina, U.S.
- Military career
- Allegiance: United States of America
- Branch: United States Air Force
- Service years: 1952–1981
- Rank: Major General
- Awards: Distinguished Service Medal, Silver Star, Defense Superior Service Medal, Legion of Merit with two oak leaf clusters, Distinguished Flying Cross with two oak leaf clusters, Bronze Star Medal, Meritorious Service Medal, Air Medal with 13 oak leaf clusters, Air Force Commendation Medal with two oak leaf clusters, Purple Heart, and from the Republic of Vietnam the Air Service Medal Honor Class, Gallantry Cross with palm

James Robert Hildreth (May 4, 1927 – February 1, 2022) was a major general in the United States Air Force who served as commander of Thirteenth Air Force at Clark Air Base in the Philippines.

== Biography ==
James Robert Hildreth was born on May 4, 1927, in Pine Bluff, Arkansas. He graduated from Pine Bluff High School in May 1944. He served in the U.S. Army in an enlisted status from January 1946 until November 1948. He then entered Louisiana Polytechnic Institute and upon graduation in May 1952 received a bachelor of arts degree in political science and a commission through the Reserve Officers' Training Corps program.

Hildreth returned to active duty in August 1952 and completed pilot training at Foster Air Force Base, Texas, in September 1953. Hildreth served from February to November 1954 as a flight commander with the 310th Fighter-Bomber Squadron in Korea.

From December 1954 to July 1960, Hildreth served successively as a flight commander with the 429th, 386th and 481st Tactical Fighter Squadrons at Cannon Air Force Base in New Mexico. In August 1960 he moved to Spangdahlem Air Base, Germany, as a flight commander with the 7th Tactical Fighter Squadron. He was assigned to Headquarters U.S. Air Forces in Europe in June 1962 where he served as F-105 standardization and training officer.

In September 1963 Hildreth entered the Air Command and Staff College at Maxwell Air Force Base, Alabama. Upon graduation he served for three years as a tactical fighter weapons systems project officer with the Tactical Division of the Directorate of Operational Requirements, Headquarters U.S. Air Force, Washington, D.C.

In April 1967 he became commander of the 1st Air Commando Squadron at Pleiku Air Base, Republic of Vietnam, and completed 285 combat missions with a total of 618 combat hours in the A-1E Skyraider.

Upon his return to the United States in March 1968, Hildreth was assigned to Headquarters U.S. Air Force and served as chief of the Tactical Support Division in the Office of the Assistant Chief of Staff for Studies and Analysis until July 1969. He completed the curriculum at the U.S. Army War College at Carlisle Barracks, Pennsylvania, in June 1970.

Hildreth then became the vice commander and later was commander of the 4th Tactical Fighter Wing at Seymour Johnson Air Force Base, North Carolina. In May 1972 Hildreth become deputy director of operations for the National Military Command Center, J-3, Organization of the Joint Chiefs of Staff, Washington, D.C.

In May 1973 Hildreth went to Udorn Royal Thai Air Force Base, Thailand, as commander of the Thirteenth Air Force Advanced Echelon. He represented the commander, Thirteenth Air Force, on operational, logistic and administrative matters in Thailand and exercised command supervision over all Thailand units assigned to Thirteenth Air Force.

Hildreth returned to the United States in January 1975 to serve as the senior Air Force member, Weapons Systems Evaluation Group, Office of the Director of Defense Research and Engineering, Office of the Secretary of Defense, Arlington, Virginia. He was assigned as vice commander, U.S. Air Force Tactical Fighter Weapons Center at Nellis Air Force Base, Nev., in May 1976 and became the deputy commander for Tests and Exercises in December 1976. General Hildreth was assigned as commander of the Tactical Fighter Weapons Center in June 1977. He assumed his command of the Thirteenth Air Force on April 9, 1979.

His military decorations and awards include the Distinguished Service Medal, Silver Star, Defense Superior Service Medal, Legion of Merit with two oak leaf clusters, Distinguished Flying Cross with two oak leaf clusters, Bronze Star Medal, Meritorious Service Medal, Air Medal with 13 oak leaf clusters, Air Force Commendation Medal with two oak leaf clusters, Purple Heart, and from the Republic of Vietnam the Air Service Medal Honor Class and the Gallantry Cross with palm. He is a command pilot and has flown fighter and attack aircraft, ranging from the A-1 Skyraider to the F-15 Eagle.

Hildreth was promoted to the grade of major general on January 18, 1977, with date of rank November 1, 1973. He retired on July 1, 1981.

James R. Hildreth died at home in Spring Hope, North Carolina on February 1, 2022, at the age of 94.
