= Thirteenth Expeditionary Air Force =

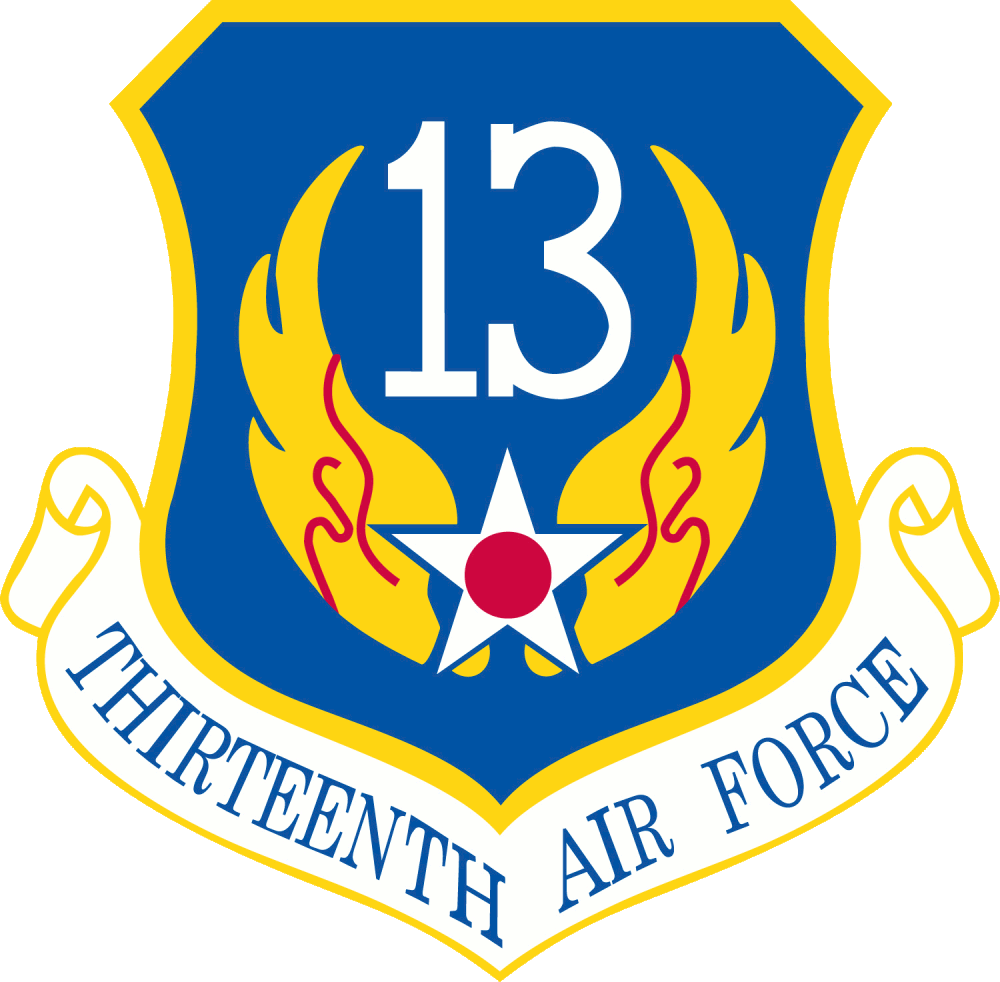
- Shield of the Thirteenth Air Force
- Active: 29 September 2012 – present (as Thirteenth Expeditionary Air Force); 16 January 2007 – 28 September 2012 (as Thirteenth Air Force (Air Forces Pacific)); 1 February 1953 – 16 January 2007; 8 February 1952 – 1 February 1953; 14 December 1942 – 8 February 1952 (as Thirteenth Air Force) (83 years, 7 months)
- Country: United States
- Branch: United States Air Force (18 September 1947 – present); United States Army ( Army Air Forces, 14 December 1942 – 18 September 1947)
- Type: Numbered Air Force
- Role: Provide combat-ready air forces for U.S. Pacific Command
- Part of: Pacific Air Forces; U.S. Pacific Command
- Garrison/HQ: Hickam Air Force Base, Joint Base Pearl Harbor–Hickam, Hawaii
- Nickname: Jungle Air Force
- Engagements: World War II – Asiatic-Pacific Theater: Bismarck Archipelago; Leyte; New Guinea; Southern Philippines; Second Taiwan Strait Crisis

- Decorations: Air Force Outstanding Unit Award Philippine Presidential Unit Citation Republic of Vietnam Gallantry Cross with Palm

Commanders
- Current commander: Maj Gen Brandon D. Parker
- Notable commanders: Nathan F. Twining; Hubert R. Harmon; Benjamin O. Davis Jr.

The Thirteenth Expeditionary Air Force (13 EAF) is a provisional numbered air force of the United States Air Force Pacific Air Forces (PACAF). It is headquartered at Hickam Air Force Base, Joint Base Pearl Harbor–Hickam on the island of Oahu, Hawaii. It has never been stationed in the continental United States.

The command plans, commands and controls, delivers, and assesses air, space, and information operations in the Asia-Pacific region—excluding the Korea theater of operations—across the security spectrum from peacetime engagement to major combat operations.

Established on 14 December 1942 at Plaine Des Gaiacs Airfield, on New Caledonia, 13 AF was a United States Army Air Forces combat air force deployed to the Pacific Theater of World War II. It engaged in operations primarily in the South Pacific, attacking enemy forces in the Solomon Islands, Gilbert and Marshall Islands campaigns; Mariana and Palau Islands campaigns, and the Philippines campaign (1944–45).

During the Cold War, 13 AF remained in the Philippines, providing air defense of the nation and becoming one of the Numbered Air Forces of Pacific Air Forces (PACAF). During the Korean War, its units provided staging areas for people and equipment destined for the war zone. As the Vietnam War escalated during the late 1960s and early 1970s, 13th AF provided command and control for USAF units stationed in Thailand, its units conducting combat missions throughout Indochina until August 1973. 13 AF units last engaged in combat during the SS Mayaguez Incident in May 1975.

Returning to the Philippines after the Vietnam War ended in 1975, the command remained there until the 1991 evacuation of Clark Air Base after the Mount Pinatubo eruption, and the United States withdrawal of military forces afterward.

It was inactivated on 28 September, 2012, and its functions merged with PACAF. The next day, the organization was converted to provisional status and reactivated as the Thirteenth Expeditionary Air Force.

== Overview ==
The command is charged with planning, executing, and assessing operations in support of the U.S. Pacific Command commander's objectives. On behalf of the Pacific Air Forces commander, the 13th AF commander is positioned to command Air Force forces, combined or joint force air components, or a joint task force. Thirteenth AF also commands the only Air Force-led standing joint task force, Joint Task Force Support Forces Antarctica, a collaborative Department of Defense and National Science Foundation effort supporting the U.S. Antarctic Program through Operation Deep Freeze.

Headquarters, 13 AF is made up of an A-staff (the Air Force Forces staff), personal staff, 613th Air and Space Operations Center (AOC), known as the Maj Richard Bong AOC, and the 613th Support Group. The 613th AOC is one of the U.S. Air Force's five full-capability AN/USQ-163 FALCONER weapon systems with the ability to plan, task, execute, monitor, and assess full-spectrum air, space, and information operations for the COMAFFOR and/or C/JFACC. The AOC serves as the nerve center of air operations during any campaign.

In June 1991, Mount Pinatubo buried Clark Air Base, Philippines, in volcanic ash, leading to the evacuation of military personnel and their families in Operation Fiery Vigil, eventually forcing the base to close 26 November 1991. Thirteenth AF relocated and officially established its headquarters at Andersen AFB, Guam, on 2 December 1991.

The command was moved from Guam to Hickam AFB in May 2005. In the early 2000s, 13 AF activated the 13th Air Expeditionary Group for a number of exercises, (February 2004-1 April 2004 for Exercise Balikatan 04; February–March 2004 for Exercise Cope Tiger 04; January–February 2005 for Exercise Cope Tiger 05.

== History ==
Thirteenth Air Force has never been stationed in the continental United States; it is also one of the oldest, continuously active, numbered air forces. It engaged in combat in the Pacific Theater during World War II. Since World War II, it has provided air defense in the Far East, primarily the Philippines, until the 1991 eruption of Mt. Pinatubo forced the closure of Clark AB. Numerous Thirteenth Air Force organizations participated in Southeast Asia combat operations in the 1960s and 1970s.

=== Lineage ===
- Established as Thirteenth Air Force on 14 December 1942

Activated on 13 January 1943
Inactivated on 8 February 1952

- Activated on 1 February 1953

Redesignated as Thirteenth Air Force (Air Forces Pacific) on 16 January 2007
Inactivated on 28 September 2012

- Redesignated as Thirteenth Expeditionary Air Force, and converted to provisional status, on 29 September 2012

Activated on 29 September 2012

=== Assignments ===
- United States Army Forces in the Far East, 14 December 1942
- Far East Air Forces, 15 June 1944 – 8 February 1952, 1 February 1953 – 17 May 1955
- Pacific Air Force (later, Pacific Air Force/FEAF [Rear]), 17 May 1955 – 1 July 1957
- Pacific Air Forces, 1 July 1957 – 28 September 2012
- Pacific Air Forces, to activate or inactivate at any time, 29 September 2012 – present

=== Stations ===
- Plaine Des Gaiacs Airfield, New Caledonia, Melanesia (January 1943)
- Pekoa Airfield, Espiritu Santo, New Hebrides, (January 1943 – January 1944)
- Carney Airfield, Guadalcanal, Solomon Islands, (January – June 1944)
- Momote Airfield, Los Negros, Admiralty Islands, (June – September 1944)
- Hollandia, New Guinea (September 1944)
- Hollandia Airfield, Netherlands East Indies, (September – October 1944)
- Wama Airfield, Morotai, Netherlands East Indies, (October 1944 – March 1945)
- Clark Field, Luzon, Philippines, (March 1945 – January 1946)
- Fort William McKinley, Luzon, Philippines, 30 May 1946
- Clark Field, Luzon, Philippines, 15 August 1947
- Kadena Air Base, Okinawa, 1 December 1948
- Ching Chuan Kang Air Base, Taiwan, August 1958 – 25 April 1979
- Tainan Air Base, Taiwan, 27 January 1955 – 7 January 1976
- Clark Air Force Base (Later Clark Air Base), Luzon, Philippines, 16 May 1949
- Andersen Air Force Base, Guam, 2 December 1991 – 2 May 2005
- Hickam Air Force Base, Hawaii, 2 May 2005 – 28 September 2012
- Hickam Air Force Base, Joint Base Pearl Harbor–Hickam, Hawaii, 29 September 2012 – present

=== World War II ===
==== Commands ====
During World War II, 13th AF consisted of two major commands, XIII Fighter Command and XIII Bomber Command.

===== XIII Fighter Command =====
Activated on 13 January 1943. Served in combat with Thirteenth AF until the end of the war. Inactivated in the Philippines on 15 March 1946. Disbanded on 8 October 1948.

Groups

- 18th Fighter Group (1943–47) (P-40F, P-39, P-38, P-61, P-70)
  (Transferred from Fifth Air Force, Hickam Field, Hawaii in March 1943).
- 347th Fighter Group (1942–45) (P-39, P-38, P-40, P-400)
  (Established on New Caledonia on 3 October 1942)
- 4th Reconnaissance Group (1943–45) (F-4 (P-38))
- 403d Troop Carrier Group (1943–46) (C-46, C-47)
- Unattached Units:
  - Det B 6th Night Fighter Squadron (February – September 1943) (P-70, P-38)
    Reassigned to 7th Air Force, 1943.
  - 419th Night Fighter Squadron (April – November 1943) (P-38, P-61)
    Activated April 1943 with P-38s, Reassigned to 18th Fighter Group, November 1943. Reequipped with P-61s May 1944. Served in New Guinea, Philippines. Inactivated February 1947.
  - 550th Night Fighter Squadron (1944–46) (P-61)
    Activated June 1944. Received P-61s January 1945. Served in New Guinea, Philippines. Inactivated January 1946.
  - 7th Radio Squadron, Mobile (J)

===== XIII Bomber Command =====
Activated on 13 January 1943. Served in combat with Thirteenth AF until the end of the war. Inactivated in the Philippines on 15 March 1946. Disbanded on 8 October 1948.

Groups

- 5th Bombardment Group (1943–46) (B-17, B-24)
  (Deployed to Espiritu Santo in November 1942, reassigned from Seventh Air Force in January 1943).
- 11th Bombardment Group (1943) (B-17, B-24)
  (Deployed to New Hebrides in July 1942, reassigned from Seventh Air Force in January 1943. Reassigned back to Seventh Air Force, May 1943 and transferred to Hawaii)
- 42d Bombardment Group (1943–45) (B-25, B-26)
  (Reassigned from Second Air Force antisubmarine patrol duty, March 1943)
- 307th Bombardment Group (1943–45) (B-17, B-24)
  (Reassigned from Seventh Air Force, February 1943)
- 868th Bombardment Squadron (Unattached) (1944–45) (B-24)
  Formerly 349th Bomb Squadron, 5th Bomb Group. The planes flown by the 868th were often called SB-24s and sometimes LABs (Low Altitude Bomber). They were equipped with SRC-717-B search and navigation radar. Formed into 868th Bomb Squadron in January 1944 and operated independently within the 13th AF.

==== Operational history ====
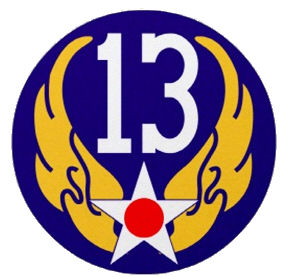

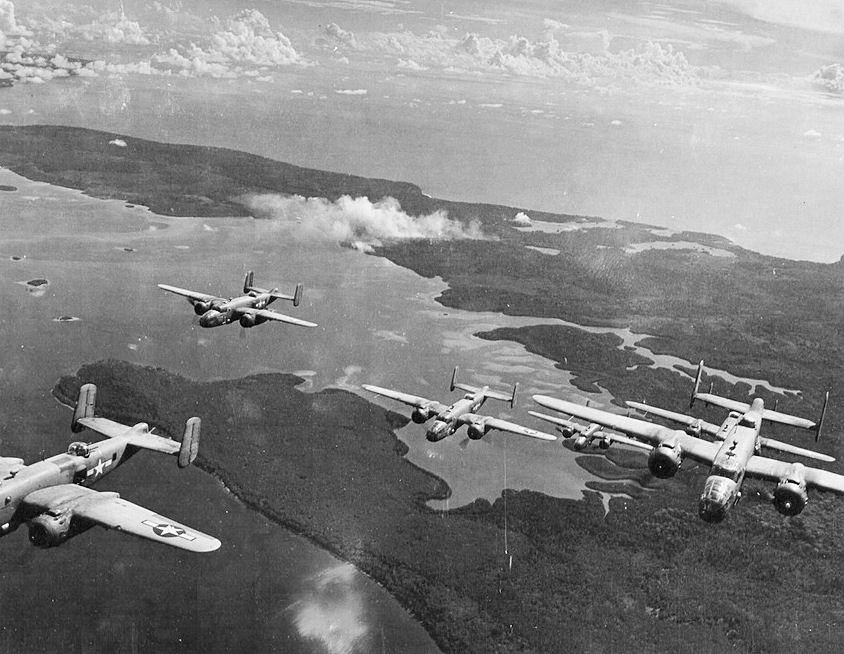
B-25 Mitchells from the 42d Bombardment Group fly over Bougainville from their base at Stirling Airfield, Stirling Island, Solomon Islands, 1944

Thirteenth Air Force began operations in November 1942 as an organization composed of many widely separated Seventh Air Force and independent units scattered in the South Central Pacific during the Solomon Islands campaign.

Initially charged with taking a defensive stand against advancing enemy forces, Thirteenth Air Force later took the offensive flying a variety of aircraft, including the B-17 Flying Fortress, B-24 Liberator, B-25 Mitchell, B-26 Marauder, P-38 Lightning, P-39 Airacobra, P-40 Warhawk, P-61 Black Widow, C-46 Commando, C-47 Skytrain, and L-5 Sentinel.

It was Thirteenth Air Force P-38Gs of the 339th Fighter Squadron of the 347th Fighter Group which, on 18 April 1943, flew the mission which resulted in the death of Japanese Admiral Isoroku Yamamoto.

From 1942 to 1945, Thirteenth Air Force staged out of tropical jungles on more than 40 remote islands including the Gilbert and Marshall Islands campaign; Mariana and Palau Islands campaign and the Philippines campaign (1944–45), thus earning the nickname, "The Jungle Air Force." The command's units participated in a total of five different operation areas and 13 campaigns.

Thirteenth Air Force along with Fifth Air Force in Australia and Seventh Air Force in Hawaii were assigned to the newly created Far East Air Forces (FEAF) on 3 August 1944. FEAF was subordinate to the U.S. Army Forces Far East and served as the headquarters of Allied Air Forces Southwest Pacific Area. By 1945, three numbered air forces—5th, 7th and 13th—were supporting operations in the Pacific. FEAF was the functional equivalent in the Pacific of the United States Strategic Air Forces (USSTAF) in the European Theater of Operations.

After hostilities ended in 1945, Thirteenth Air Force established its headquarters at Clark Field, Philippines, in January 1946. In May of that year, it moved to Fort William McKinley, Luzon. By August 1947, 13AF returned to Clark Field. In December 1948, the unit moved to Kadena, Okinawa, where it remained for only a few months before returning to Clark in May 1949.

=== Korean War ===
On 25 June 1950, 13AF consisted of the following units:

- 18th Fighter-Bomber Wing/Group (F-80)
- 21st Troop Carrier Squadron (C-54)
- 6204th Photo Mapping Flight (RB-17))

The 6204th Photo Mapping Flight, located at Clark AB, Philippines, deployed the Flight's two RB-17 aircraft complete with combat crews and maintenance personnel to Johnson AB, Japan in mid-June 1950. The FEAF deployment order specified that the two RB-17 aircraft be equipped with normal armament insofar as practicable, not to interfere with the photographic capability of the aircraft. This posed a problem for the Flight, since the RB-17s had been flying peacetime missions and were not equipped for combat. However, the 6204th found the necessary gunners and equipment, made the modifications to the aircraft, and by late August 1950 the detachment began flying photo-mapping missions over Korea. By the end of November 1950, it had photographed the entire North Korean area at least once and re-photographed some areas as far north as weather conditions permitted. By early December the detachment returned to Clark AB and resumed the flight's mapping program in the Philippine area.

During the Korean War, 13AF units provided staging areas for people and equipment destined for the war zone. During the decade of peace that followed the war, the command concentrated on training and surveillance activities to maintain a high state of readiness for contingencies.

=== Vietnam War ===
From the time of signing of U.S./Taiwan defense arrangements, the 327th Air Division of 13th Air Force maintained units in Taiwan, up until 1979. 327th Air Division reported in this capacity to United States Taiwan Defense Command.

As the Vietnam War escalated during the late 1960s and early 1970s, 13AF again served as a staging base and logistics manager for units fighting in Southeast Asia. As more American aircraft and people were poured into the war effort, combat units and facilities under 13AF in Thailand increased. At its peak, 13AF was composed of seven combat wings, nine major bases, 11 smaller installations and more than 31,000 military members.

With the buildup and execution of Operations Desert Shield and Storm, 13AF provided aircraft and support staff vital to the Gulf war coalition victory in Southwest Asia.

=== Post Cold War ===
In June 1991, Mount Pinatubo buried Clark in volcanic ash, forcing the base to close on 26 November and leading to the evacuation of assigned military members and their families in Operation Fiery Vigil. The Thirteenth Air Force relocated and officially established its headquarters at Andersen Air Force Base on 2 December 1991.

In 2005, the Jungle Air Force stood down as a traditional Numbered Air Force and moved to Hickam Air Force Base to assume the role of the new Kenney Warfighting Headquarters for PACAF, which was activated in provisional status in June 2005.

On 6 October 2006, after a one-year transformation of command and control of air, space and information operations in the Pacific, Thirteenth Air Force officially began operations as a component numbered air force headquarters and welcomed a new commander. Former Pacific Air Forces Deputy Commander, Lt. Gen. Loyd S. "Chip" Utterback, assumed command of the unit 6 October, replacing Maj. Gen. Edward A. Rice Jr., who had commanded Thirteenth Air Force from Andersen Air Force Base, Guam, and Hickam since January 2005. Previously designated as a management headquarters, Thirteenth Air Force became one of 10 organizations designed to enhance the operational level support, planning, command, control and execution of air, space and information operations capabilities across the full range of military operations throughout the U.S. Pacific Command's area of responsibility (minus the Korea theater of operations). On 28 September 2012, 13 AF was inactivated and its functions merged into PACAF.

Prior to its inactivation, units assigned to 13 AF included:

- 15th Wing, Hickam AFB Hawaii, providing airlift with C-17s, one specially configured C-40 and one C-37. It also includes a squadron of Lockheed F-22s.
- 36th Wing, Andersen AFB, Guam, maintaining a strategically located base;
- Detachment 1, 13 AF was activated at Yokota AB, Japan. Det 1 was responsible for planning, coordinating, and executing air operations around Japan in coordination with the Japan Air Self Defense Force;
- 613th Support Group

The 13th Air Expeditionary Group, and formerly the 500th Air Expeditionary Group, was activated seasonally to support Operation Deep Freeze in the Antarctic.

On 29 September 2012, the Thirteenth Air Force was converted to provisional status and reactivated as the Thirteenth Expeditionary Air Force. The organization is commanded by the Director of Air and Cyberspace Operations of Pacific Air Forces.

== List of commanders ==
=== Thirteenth Air Force (1943–2012) ===
No.	Commander		Term		
No.	Portrait	Name	Took office	Left office	Term length
1	Nathan F. Twining	Major General; Nathan F. Twining	13 January 1943	27 July 1943	195 days
2	Ray L. Owens	Brigadier General; Ray L. Owens	27 July 1943	7 January 1944	164 days
3	Hubert R. Harmon	Major General; Hubert R. Harmon	7 January 1944	6 June 1944	151 days
-	George L. Usher	Brigadier General; George L. Usher; Acting	6 June 1944	15 June 1944	9 days
4	St. Clair Streett	Major General; St. Clair Streett	15 June 1944	19 February 1945	249 days
5	Paul B. Wurtsmith	Major General; Paul B. Wurtsmith	19 February 1945	4 July 1946	1 year, 135 days
6	Eugene L. Eubank	Major General; Eugene L. Eubank	4 July 1946	November 1948	c. 2 years, 4 months
7	Jarred V. Crabb	Brigadier General; Jarred V. Crabb	November 1948	1 December 1948	c. 1 month
8	Charles T. Myers	Major General; Charles T. Myers	1 December 1948	c. 30 May 1949	180 days
9	Howard M. Turner	Major General; Howard M. Turner	c. 30 May 1949	16 October 1951	2 years, 139 days
10	Ernest Moore	Major General; Ernest Moore	16 October 1951	10 October 1952	360 days
11	John W. Sessums Jr.	Major General; John W. Sessums Jr.	10 October 1952	27 August 1954	1 year, 321 days
12	William L. Lee	Brigadier General; William L. Lee	27 August 1954	15 September 1956	2 years, 19 days
13	John B. Ackerman	Major General; John B. Ackerman	15 September 1956	February 1958	1 year, 166 days
14	Thomas S. Moorman	Major General; Thomas S. Moorman	14 April 1958	19 June 1961	3 years, 66 days
15	Theodore R. Milton	Major General; Theodore R. Milton	19 June 1961	24 July 1963	2 years, 35 days
16	Sam Maddux Jr.	Major General; Sam Maddux Jr.	24 July 1963	1 July 1965	1 year, 342 days
17	James W. Wilson	Lieutenant General; James W. Wilson	1 July 1965	1 August 1967	2 years, 31 days
18	Benjamin O. Davis Jr.	Lieutenant General; Benjamin O. Davis Jr.	1 August 1967	1 August 1968	1 year, 0 days
19	Francis C. Gideon	Lieutenant General; Francis C. Gideon	1 August 1968	1 February 1970	1 year, 184 days
20	Marvin L. McNickle	Lieutenant General; Marvin L. McNickle	1 February 1970	1 September 1972	2 years, 213 days
21	William G. Moore	Lieutenant General; William G. Moore	1 September 1972	1 October 1973	1 year, 30 days
22	Leroy J. Manor	Major General; Leroy J. Manor	1 October 1973	8 October 1976	3 years, 7 days
23	Freddie L. Poston	Major General; Freddie L. Poston	8 October 1976	9 April 1979	2 years, 183 days
24	James R. Hildreth	Major General; James R. Hildreth	9 April 1979	22 June 1981	2 years, 74 days
25	Kenneth D. Burns	Major General; Kenneth D. Burns	22 June 1981	6 July 1984	3 years, 14 days
26	Michael A. Nelson	Major General; Michael A. Nelson	6 July 1984	17 June 1985	346 days
27	Gordon E. Williams	Major General; Gordon E. Williams	17 June 1985	27 March 1986	283 days
28	Charles F. Luigs	Brigadier General; Charles F. Luigs	27 March 1986	31 July 1986	126 days
29	Michael P. C. Carns	Major General; Michael P. C. Carns	31 July 1986	19 June 1987	323 days
30	Donald Snyder	Major General; Donald Snyder	19 June 1987	January 1990	2 years, 196 days
31	William A. Studer	Major General; William A. Studer	January 1990	2 December 1991	1 year, 335 days
32	H. Hale Burr	Major General; H. Hale Burr	2 December 1991	21 July 1994	2 years, 231 days
33	Richard T. Swope	Major General; Richard T. Swope	21 July 1994	22 April 1996	1 year, 276 days
34	John R. Dallager	Major General; John R. Dallager	22 April 1996	20 August 1998	2 years, 120 days
35	Thomas C. Waskow	Major General; Thomas C. Waskow	20 August 1998	May 1999	254 days
36	Daniel M. Dick	Major General; Daniel M. Dick	May 1999	14 November 2000	1 year, 197 days
37	Theodore W. Lay II	Major General; Theodore W. Lay II	14 November 2000	21 September 2002	1 year, 311 days
38	Dennis R. Larsen	Major General; Dennis R. Larsen	21 September 2002	24 January 2005	2 years, 125 days
39	Edward A. Rice Jr.	Major General; Edward A. Rice Jr.	24 January 2005	6 October 2006	1 year, 255 days
40	Loyd S. Utterback	Lieutenant General; Loyd S. Utterback	6 October 2006	2 September 2009	2 years, 331 days
41	Herbert J. Carlisle	Lieutenant General; Herbert J. Carlisle	2 September 2009	December 2010	1 year, 90 days
42	Stanley T. Kresge	Lieutenant General; Stanley T. Kresge	December 2010	28 September 2012	1 year, 302 days

=== Thirteenth Expeditionary Air Force (2012–present) ===
No.	Commander		Term		
No.	Portrait	Name	Took office	Left office	Term length
43	Russell J. Handy	Major General; Russell J. Handy	29 September 2012	18 July 2013	292 days
44	Paul H. McGillicuddy	Brigadier General; Paul H. McGillicuddy	18 July 2013	August 2013	14 days
45	Jeffrey R. McDaniels	Brigadier General; Jeffrey R. McDaniels	August 2013	June 2015	1 year, 304 days
46	Dirk D. Smith	Brigadier General; Dirk D. Smith	June 2015	March 2017	1 year, 273 days
47	Stephen C. Williams	Brigadier General; Stephen C. Williams	March 2017	14 January 2019	1 year, 319 days
48	Russell L. Mack	Major General; Russell L. Mack	14 January 2019	3 June 2019	140 days
49	Scott L. Pleus	Major General; Scott L. Pleus	3 June 2019	18 July 2020	1 year, 45 days
50	Lansing R. Pilch	Major General; Lansing R. Pilch	18 July 2020	26 July 2021	1 year, 8 days
51	David R. Iverson	Major General; David R. Iverson	26 July 2021	30 January 2024	4 years, 358 days
52	Brandon D. Parker	Major General; Brandon D. Parker	30 January 2024	Incumbent	2 years, 170 days
