= List of United States Air Force lieutenant generals from 2000 to 2009 =

Flag of an Air Force lieutenant general

The rank of lieutenant general (or three-star general) is the second-highest rank normally achievable in the United States Air Force, and the first to have a specified number of appointments set by statute. It ranks above major general (two-star general) and below general (four-star general).

There were 117 lieutenant generals in the U.S. Air Force from 2000 to 2009, 31 of whom were elevated to four-star general. All 117 achieved that rank while on active duty in the U.S. Air Force. Lieutenant generals entered the Air Force via several paths: 55 were commissioned via the U.S. Air Force Academy (USAFA), 36 via Air Force Reserve Officer Training Corps (AFROTC) at a civilian university, 16 via Air Force Officer Training School (OTS), seven via AFROTC at a senior military college, and three via direct commission (direct).

== List of generals ==
Entries in the following list of lieutenant generals are indexed by the numerical order in which each officer was promoted to that rank while on active duty, or by an asterisk (*) if the officer did not serve in that rank while on active duty in the U.S. Air Force or was promoted to four-star rank while on active duty in the U.S. Air Force. Each entry lists the general's name, date of rank, (Note: Dates of rank are taken, where available, from the U.S. Air Force register of active and retired commissioned officers, or from the officer's official Air Force biography. The date listed is that of the officer's first promotion to lieutenant general. If such a date cannot be found, the next date substituted should be that of the officer's assumption of his/her first three-star appointment. Failing which, the officer's first Senate confirmation date to lieutenant general should be substituted.) active-duty positions held while serving at three-star rank, (Note: Positions listed are those held by the officer when promoted to lieutenant general. Dates listed are for the officer's full tenure, which may predate promotion to three-star rank or postdate retirement from active duty. Positions held in an acting capacity are italicized.) number of years of active-duty service at three-star rank (Yrs), (Note: The number of years of active-duty service at three-star rank is approximated by subtracting the year in the "Date of rank" column from the last year in the "Position" column. Time spent between active-duty three-star assignments is not counted.) year commissioned and source of commission, (Note: Sources of commission are listed in parentheses after the year of commission and include: the United States Air Force Academy (USAFA); the United States Military Academy (USMA); the United States Naval Academy (USNA); Reserve Officer Training Corps (ROTC) at a civilian university; Air Force Reserve Officer Training Corps (AFROTC) at a civilian university; ROTC or AFROTC at a senior military college such as Texas A&M University (Texas A&M), the Virginia Military Institute (VMI), or Virginia Polytechnic Institute and State University (VPI); Air Force Officer Training School (OTS); and direct commission (direct).) number of years in commission when promoted to three-star rank (YC), (Note: The number of years in commission before being promoted to three-star rank is approximated by subtracting the year in the "Commission" column from the year in the "Date of rank" column.) and other biographical notes (years of birth and death are shown in parentheses in the Notes column). (Note: Notes include years of birth and death; awards of the Medal of Honor, Congressional Gold Medal, Presidential Medal of Freedom, or honors of similar significance; major government appointments; university presidencies or equivalents; familial relationships with other significant military officers or significant government officials such as U.S. Presidents, cabinet secretaries, U.S. Senators, or state governors; and unusual career events such as premature relief or death in office. Officers who served as enlisted airmen for 7 years or more prior to commissioning are also noted.)

List of U.S. Air Force lieutenant generals from 2000 to 2009
| # | Name | Photo | Date of rank | Position | Yrs | Commission | YC | Notes |
|---|---|---|---|---|---|---|---|---|
| * | Charles F. Wald | | 12 Jan 2000 | Commander, Ninth Air Force/Commander, U.S. Central Command Air Forces (COMUSCENTAF), 2000–2001.; Deputy Chief of Staff, Air and Space Operations, Air Staff (DCS A3), 2001–2002. | 2 | 1971 (AFROTC) | 29 | (1948– ) Promoted to general, 1 Jan 2003. |
| * | Norton A. Schwartz | | 18 Jan 2000 | Deputy Commander in Chief, U.S. Special Operations Command (DCINCSOC), 2000.; Commander, Alaskan NORAD Region/Commander, Alaskan Command/Commander, Eleventh Air Force (CDRANR/CDRALCOM), 2000–2002.; Director, Operations, Joint Staff, J3, 2002–2004.; Director, Joint Staff (DJS), 2004–2005. | 5 | 1973 (USAFA) | 27 | (1951– ) (Note: Served as a combatant commander (CCDR).) (Note: Served as Chief of Staff, U.S. Air Force (CSAF).) Promoted to general, 1 Oct 2005. President, Institute for Defense Analyses, 2020–present. |
| * | Bruce A. Carlson | | 1 Feb 2000 | Director, Force Structure, Resources and Assessment, Joint Staff, J8, 2000–2002.; Commander, Eighth Air Force/Joint Functional Component Commander for Space and Global Strike (JFCC SGS), 2002–2005. | 5 | 1971 (AFROTC) | 29 | (1949– ) Promoted to general, 1 Sep 2005. Director, National Reconnaissance Office, 2009–2012. |
| 1 | Charles H. Coolidge Jr. | | 7 Feb 2000 | Vice Commander, Air Force Materiel Command (VCOMAFMC), 2000–2003. | 3 | 1968 (USAFA) | 32 | (1946– ) Son of Medal of Honor recipient Charles H. Coolidge. |
| 2 | Stephen B. Plummer | | 1 May 2000 | Principal Deputy, Office of the Assistant Secretary of the Air Force for Acquisition/Military Director, U.S. Air Force Scientific Advisory Board, 2000–2003. | 3 | 1969 (OTS) | 31 | (1946– ) |
| * | Ronald E. Keys | | 1 Jul 2000 | Commander, Allied Air Forces Southern Europe/Commander, Stabilisation Forces Air Component and Kosovo Forces Air Component/Commander, Sixteenth Air Force and Sixteenth Air and Space Expeditionary Task Force (COMAIRSOUTH/COMAIRSFOR/COMAIRKFOR), 2000–2002.; Deputy Chief of Staff, Air and Space Operations, Air Staff (DCS A3), 2002–2005. | 5 | 1967 (AFROTC) | 33 | (1945– ) Promoted to general, 27 May 2005. |
| 3 | Harry D. Raduege Jr. | | 1 Jul 2000 | Director, Defense Information Systems Agency/Manager, National Communications System (DIRDISA/MNCS), 2000–2003.; Director, Defense Information Systems Agency (DIRDISA), 2003–2004.; Director, Defense Information Systems Agency/Commander, Joint Task Force – Global Network Operations/Deputy Commander, Global Network Operations and Defense, U.S. Strategic Command Joint Forces Headquarters – Information Operations (DIRDISA/CDRJTF-GNO/DCDR GNO-Def), 2004–2005. | 5 | 1970 (AFROTC) | 30 | (1947– ) |
| 4 | Robert C. Hinson | | 1 Jul 2000 | Deputy Commander in Chief, U.S. Strategic Command (DCINCSTRAT), 2000–2002.; Vice Commander, Air Force Space Command (VCOMAFSPC), 2002–2003. | 3 | 1971 (OTS) (Note: Enlisted in 1970 as administrative assistant, commissioned as second lieutenant in 1971.) | 29 | (1947– ) Executive Director, National Security Research Institute at the University of Nebraska–Lincoln, 2012–2020. |
| 5 | Michael E. Zettler | | 1 Jul 2000 | Deputy Chief of Staff, Installations and Logistics, Air Staff (DCS A4), 2000–2003. | 3 | 1970 (AFROTC) | 30 | (1948– ) |
| 6 | John R. Dallager | | 1 Aug 2000 | Superintendent, U.S. Air Force Academy, 2000–2003. | 3 | 1969 (USAFA) | 31 | (1947– ) (Note: Resigned, April 2003, and retired as major general.) Resigned, 2003. |
| * | William T. Hobbins | | 1 Oct 2000 | Commander, Twelfth Air Force/Commander, U.S. Southern Command Air Forces/Air Force Component Commander, U.S. Strategic Command (COMSOUTHAF/AIRCDRUSSTRATCOM), 2000–2002.; Commander, Twelfth Air Force/Commander, U.S. Southern Command Air Forces (COMSOUTHAF), 2002–2003.; Deputy Chief of Staff, Warfighting Integration, Air Staff (DCS A6), 2003–2005.; Deputy Chief of Staff, Warfighting Integration, Air Staff/Chief of Warfighting Integration and Chief Information Officer, Office of the Secretary of the Air Force (DCS A6/CIO), 2005. | 5 | 1969 (OTS) | 31 | (1946– ) Promoted to general, 1 Feb 2006. |
| 7 | Tome H. Walters Jr. | | 1 Oct 2000 | Director, Defense Security Cooperation Agency (DIRDSCA), 2000–2004. | 4 | 1970 (USAFA) | 30 | (1948– ) |
| 8 | Joseph H. Wehrle Jr. | | 1 Oct 2000 | Deputy Chief of Staff, Plans and Programs, Air Staff (DCS A5/8), 2000–2002.; Assistant Vice Chief of Staff, U.S. Air Force (AVCSAF), 2002–2003. | 3 | 1970 (USMA) | 30 | (1948– ) |
| 9 | John H. Campbell | | 6 Oct 2000 | Associate Director of Central Intelligence, Military Support, Central Intelligence Agency (ADCI/MS), 2000–2003. | 3 | 1969 (AFROTC) | 31 | (1947– ) |
| 10 | Raymond P. Huot | | 1 Dec 2000 | Inspector General, U.S. Air Force (AF/IG), 2000–2003. | 3 | 1967 (AFROTC) | 33 | (1945– ) |
| 11 | Glen W. Moorhead III | | 1 Dec 2000 | Vice Commander, U.S. Air Forces in Europe (VCOMUSAFE), 2000–2002.; Commander, Allied Air Forces Southern Europe/Commander, Stabilisation Forces Air Component and Kosovo Forces Air Component/Commander, Sixteenth Air Force and Sixteenth Air and Space Expeditionary Task Force (COMAIRSOUTH/COMAIRSFOR/COMAIRKFOR), 2002–2004.; Commander, Allied Air Component Command İzmir/Commander, Stabilisation Forces Air Component and Kosovo Forces Air Component/Commander, Sixteenth Air Force and Sixteenth Air and Space Expeditionary Task Force (COMAIR-COM İzmir/COMAIRSFOR/COMAIRKFOR), 2004.; Commander, Allied Air Component Command İzmir/Commander, European Union Force Bosnia and Herzegovina/Commander, Kosovo Forces Air Component/Commander, Sixteenth Air Force and Sixteenth Air and Space Expeditionary Task Force (COMAIR-COM İzmir/COMEUFOR/COMAIRKFOR), 2004–2006. | 6 | 1969 (USAFA) | 31 | (1946– ) |
| 12 | John D. Hopper Jr. | | 1 Jan 2001 | Vice Commander, Air Education and Training Command (VCOMAETC), 2000–2005. | 5 | 1969 (USAFA) | 32 | (1946– ) |
| 13 | Donald A. Lamontagne | | 1 May 2001 | Commander, Air University/Director of Education, Air Education and Training Command (COMAU/Edu. AETC), 2001–2004. | 3 | 1969 (Texas A&M) | 32 | (1947– ) |
| 14 | James E. Sherrard III | | 24 May 2001 | Chief, Air Force Reserve/Commander, Air Force Reserve Command (CAFR/COMAFRC), 1998–2004. | 3 | 1965 (AFROTC) | 36 | (1943– ) |
| 15 | Brian A. Arnold | | 1 Jul 2001 | Commander, Space and Missile Systems Center (COMSMC), 2001–2005. | 4 | 1973 (OTS) | 28 | (1946– ) |
| 16 | Richard V. Reynolds | | 1 Aug 2001 | Commander, Aeronautical Systems Center (COMASC), 2001–2003.; Vice Commander, Air Force Materiel Command (VCOMAFMC), 2003–2005. | 4 | 1971 (USAFA) | 30 | (1949– ) |
| 17 | Timothy A. Kinnan | | 1 Sep 2001 | U.S. Military Representative, NATO Military Committee (USMILREP), 2001–2004. | 3 | 1970 (USAFA) | 31 | (1948– ) |
| 18 | Richard E. Brown III | | 1 Oct 2001 | Deputy Chief of Staff, Personnel, Air Staff (DCS A1), 2001–2004.; Assistant Vice Chief of Staff, U.S. Air Force (AVCSAF), 2004. | 3 | 1970 (AFROTC) | 31 | (1948– ) |
| * | T. Michael Moseley | | 7 Nov 2001 | Commander, Ninth Air Force/Commander, U.S. Central Command Air Forces (COMUSCENTAF), 2001–2003. | 2 | 1971 (Texas A&M) | 30 | (1949– ) (Note: Served as Vice Chief of Staff, U.S. Air Force (VCSAF).) Promoted to general, 1 Oct 2003. |
| 19 | Thomas C. Waskow | | 1 Dec 2001 | Commander, U.S. Forces Japan/Commander, Fifth Air Force (COMUSFJ), 2001–2005. | 4 | 1970 (USAFA) | 31 | (1947– ) |
| 20 | Bruce A. Wright | | 10 Dec 2001 | Vice Commander, Air Combat Command (VCOMACC), 2001–2005.; Commander, Air Combat Command (COMACC), 2004–2005.; Commander, U.S. Forces Japan/Commander, Fifth Air Force (COMUSFJ), 2005–2008. | 7 | 1973 (USAFA) | 28 | (1951– ) |
| * | Lance L. Smith | | 1 Jan 2002 | Deputy Commander, United Nations Command/Deputy Commander, U.S. Forces Korea/Commander, Air Component Command, ROK/U.S. Combined Forces Command/Commander, Seventh Air Force (DCDRUNC/DCDRUSFK/AIRCDRCFC), 2001–2003.; Deputy Commander, U.S. Central Command (DCDRUSCENTCOM), 2003–2005. | 3 | 1970 (OTS) | 32 | (1946– ) (Note: Served as Supreme Allied Commander Transformation (SACT).) Promoted to general, 7 Nov 2005. |
| 21 | Steven R. Polk | | 1 Mar 2002 | Vice Commander, Pacific Air Forces (VCOMPACAF), 2002–2003.; Inspector General, U.S. Air Force (AF/IG), 2003–2006. | 4 | 1968 (USAFA) | 34 | (1947– ) |
| 22 | John R. Baker | | 1 Apr 2002 | Vice Commander, Air Mobility Command (VCOMAMC), 2002–2005. | 3 | 1972 (AFROTC) | 30 | (1948– ) |
| 23 | Thomas B. Goslin Jr. | | 18 Apr 2002 | Deputy Commander in Chief, U.S. Strategic Command (DCINCSTRAT), 2002.; Deputy Commander, U.S. Strategic Command (DCDRUSSTRATCOM), 2002–2005. | 3 | 1970 (OTS) | 32 | (1950– ) |
| * | Duncan J. McNabb | | 19 Apr 2002 | Deputy Chief of Staff, Plans and Programs, Air Staff (DCS A5/8), 2002–2004.; Director, Logistics, Joint Staff, J4, 2004–2005. | 3 | 1974 (USAFA) | 28 | (1952– ) Promoted to general, 1 Dec 2005. |
| * | William R. Looney III | | 1 Jun 2002 | Commander, Electronic Systems Center (COMESC), 2002–2003.; Commander, Aeronautical Systems Center/Program Executive Officer, Aircraft Procurement and Modernization (COMASC/PEO Aircraft), 2003–2005. | 3 | 1972 (USAFA) | 30 | (1949– ) Promoted to general, 1 Aug 2005. |
| 24 | Daniel James III | | 3 Jun 2002 | Director, Air National Guard (DIRANG), 2002–2006. | 4 | 1968 (AFROTC) | 34 | (1945–2017) Son of Air Force four-star general Daniel James Jr. First African-American to lead the Air National Guard. |
| 25 | Robert R. Dierker | | 8 Aug 2002 | Deputy Commander in Chief, U.S. Pacific Command (DCINCPAC), 2002.; Deputy Commander, U.S. Pacific Command (DCDRUSPACOM), 2002–2004. | 2 | 1972 (USAFA) | 30 | (1950– ) |
| * | Carrol H. Chandler | | 1 Nov 2002 | Commander, Alaskan NORAD Region/Commander, Alaskan Command/Commander, Eleventh Air Force (CDRANR/CDRALCOM), 2002–2003.; Commander, Alaskan NORAD Region/Commander, Alaskan Command/Commander, Joint Task Force-Alaska/Commander, Eleventh Air Force (CDRANR/CDRALCOM/CDRJTF-AK), 2003–2005.; Deputy Chief of Staff, Air and Space Operations, Air Staff (DCS A3), 2005–2006.; Deputy Chief of Staff, Air, Space and Information Operations, Plans and Requirements, Air Staff (DCS A3), 2006–2007.; Deputy Chief of Staff, Operations, Plans and Requirements, Air Staff (DCS A3), 2007. | 5 | 1974 (USAFA) | 28 | (1952– ) Promoted to general, 30 Nov 2007. |
| 26 | George P. Taylor Jr. | | 1 Dec 2002 | Surgeon General, U.S. Air Force (AF/SG), 2002–2006. | 4 | 1979 (direct) (Note: Directly commissioned via the Armed Forces Health Professions Scholarship Program (HPSP).) | 23 | (1953– ) |
| * | Arthur J. Lichte | | 1 Jan 2003 | Vice Commander, U.S. Air Forces in Europe (VCOMUSAFE), 2002–2005.; Assistant Vice Chief of Staff, U.S. Air Force (AVCSAF), 2005–2007. | 4 | 1971 (AFROTC) | 32 | (1949– ) (Note: Retired as general, 1 January 2010; retroactively demoted to major general on the retired list, 1 February 2017.) Promoted to general, 7 Sep 2007. |
| 27 | Michael M. Dunn | | 1 Sep 2003 | President, National Defense University (P-NDU), 2003–2006. | 3 | 1972 (USAFA) | 31 | (1950– ) |
| 28 | John W. Rosa Jr. | | 1 Sep 2003 | Superintendent, U.S. Air Force Academy, 2003–2005. | 2 | 1973 (Citadel) | 30 | (1951– ) President, The Citadel, 2006–2018. |
| 29 | Daniel P. Leaf | | 1 Sep 2003 | Vice Commander, Air Force Space Command (VCOMAFSPC), 2003–2005.; Deputy Commander, U.S. Pacific Command (DCDRUSPACOM), 2005–2008.; Commander, U.S. Pacific Command (CDRUSPACOM), 2007. | 5 | 1974 (AFROTC) | 29 | (1952– ) |
| 30 | Randall M. Schmidt | | 1 Sep 2003 | Commander, Twelfth Air Force/Commander, U.S. Southern Command Air Forces (COMSOUTHAF), 2003–2005.; Commander, Twelfth Air Force/Commander, U.S. Southern Command Air Forces/Senior Investigating Officer, FBI Investigation Allegations of Detainee Abuse at the Guantanamo Bay Detention Facility (COMSOUTHAF), 2005.; Commander, Twelfth Air Force/Commander, U.S. Southern Command Air Forces (COMSOUTHAF), 2005–2006.; Commander, Twelfth Air Force/Commander, Air Forces Southern (COMAFSOUTH), 2006. | 3 | 1972 (USAFA) | 31 | (1950– ) |
| 31 | Walter E. Buchanan III | | 1 Oct 2003 | Commander, Ninth Air Force/Commander, U.S. Central Command Air Forces (COMUSCENTAF), 2003–2006. | 3 | 1972 (USAFA) | 31 | (1949– ) |
| 32 | Garry R. Trexler | | 18 Nov 2003 | Deputy Commander, United Nations Command/Deputy Commander, U.S. Forces Korea/Commander, Air Component Command, ROK/U.S. Combined Forces Command/Commander, Seventh Air Force (DCDRUNC/DCDRUSFK/AIRCDRCFC), 2003–2006. | 3 | 1971 (OTS) | 32 | (1947– ) |
| 33 | William Welser III | | 1 Dec 2003 | Commander, Eighteenth Air Force, 2003–2005. | 2 | 1971 (AFROTC) | 32 | (1949– ) |
| * | Victor E. Renuart Jr. | | 1 Jan 2004 | Vice Commander, Pacific Air Forces (VCOMPACAF), 2003–2005.; Commander, George C. Kenney Headquarters (Provisional)/Vice Commander, Pacific Air Forces (COMKHQ(P)/VCOMPACAF), 2005.; Director, Strategic Plans and Policy, Joint Staff, J5/Senior Member, U.S. Delegation to the U.N. Military Staff Committee (Sr. Member MSC), 2005–2006.; Senior Military Assistant to the Secretary of Defense (SMA SecDef), 2006–2007. | 3 | 1972 (OTS) | 32 | (1949– ) (Note: Served as Commander, North American Aerospace Defense Command (CDRNORAD).) Promoted to general, 23 Mar 2007. |
| 34 | Charles L. Johnson II | | 1 Jan 2004 | Commander, Electronic Systems Center (COMESC), 2003–2007. | 3 | 1972 (USAFA) | 32 | (1949– ) |
| 35 | Donald J. Wetekam | | 23 Feb 2004 | Deputy Chief of Staff, Installations and Logistics, Air Staff (DCS A4), 2004–2007. | 3 | 1973 (USAFA) | 32 | |
| 36 | Thomas L. Baptiste | | 1 Jun 2004 | Deputy Chairman, NATO Military Committee (DCMC), 2004–2007. | 3 | 1973 (OTS) | 31 | (1951– ) |
| * | Roger A. Brady | | 3 Jun 2004 | Deputy Chief of Staff, Personnel, Air Staff (DCS A1), 2004–2008. | 4 | 1969 (AFROTC) | 35 | (1946– ) Promoted to general, 9 Jan 2008. |
| 37 | John A. Bradley | | 24 Jun 2004 | Chief, Air Force Reserve/Commander, Air Force Reserve Command (CAFR/COMAFRC), 2004–2008. | 4 | 1967 (AFROTC) | 37 | (1945– ) |
| 38 | Jeffrey B. Kohler | | 6 Jul 2004 | Director, Defense Security Cooperation Agency (DIRDSCA), 2004–2007. | 3 | 1973 (USAFA) | 31 | (1951– ) |
| 39 | John F. Regni | | 8 Jul 2004 | Commander, Air University (COMAU), 2004–2005.; Superintendent, U.S. Air Force Academy, 2005–2009. | 5 | 1973 (USAFA) | 31 | (1952– ) |
| 40 | Henry A. Obering III | | 1 Aug 2004 | Director, Missile Defense Agency (DIRMDA), 2004–2008. | 4 | 1973 (AFROTC) | 31 | (1951– ) |
| 41 | Michael W. Wooley | | 1 Aug 2004 | Commander, Air Force Special Operations Command (COMAFSOC), 2004–2007. | 3 | 1972 (OTS) | 32 | (1950– ) |
| 42 | Stephen G. Wood | | 18 Oct 2004 | Deputy Chief of Staff, Plans and Programs, Air Staff (DCS A5/8), 2004–2006.; Deputy Chief of Staff, Strategic Plans and Programs, Air Staff (DCS A5/8), 2006.; Deputy Commander, United Nations Command/Deputy Commander, U.S. Forces Korea/Commander, Air Component Command, ROK/U.S. Combined Forces Command/Commander, Seventh Air Force (DCDRUNC/DCDRUSFK/AIRCDRCFC), 2006–2008. | 4 | 1974 (AFROTC) | 30 | (1949– ) |
| * | William M. Fraser III | | 3 Feb 2005 | Vice Commander, Air Combat Command (VCOMACC), 2005–2006.; Commander, Air Combat Command (COMACC), 2005.; Assistant to the Chairman of the Joint Chiefs of Staff (ACJCS), 2006–2008. | 3 | 1974 (Texas A&M) | 31 | (1952– ) Promoted to general, 8 Oct 2008. |
| 43 | Dennis R. Larsen | | 12 Apr 2005 | Vice Commander, Air Education and Training Command (VCOMAETC), 2005–2007. | 2 | 1971 (OTS) | 34 | (1949– ) |
| * | C. Robert Kehler | | 1 Jun 2005 | Deputy Commander, U.S. Strategic Command (DCDRUSSTRATCOM), 2005–2007.; Commander, U.S. Strategic Command (CDRUSSTRATCOM), 2007. | 2 | 1975 (AFROTC) | 30 | (1952– ) Promoted to general, 12 Oct 2007. |
| 44 | Michael A. Hamel | | 1 Jun 2005 | Commander, Space and Missile Systems Center (COMSMC), 2005–2008. | 3 | 1972 (USAFA) | 33 | (1950– ) |
| 45 | Christopher A. Kelly | | 1 Jul 2005 | Vice Commander, Air Mobility Command (VCOMAMC), 2005–2008.; Commander, Air Mobility Command (COMAMC), 2005. | 3 | 1974 (USAFA) | 31 | (1952– ) |
| 46 | Robert D. Bishop Jr. | | 6 Jul 2005 | Vice Commander, U.S. Air Forces in Europe (VCOMUSAFE), 2005–2006.; Commander, Third Air Force (Air Forces Europe), 2006–2008. | 3 | 1974 (USAFA) | 31 | (1952– ) |
| 47 | Charles E. Croom Jr. | | 1 Aug 2005 | Director, Defense Information Systems Agency/Commander, Joint Task Force – Global Network Operations/Deputy Commander, Global Network Operations and Defense, U.S. Strategic Command Joint Forces Headquarters – Information Operations (DIRDISA/CDRJTF-GNO/DCDR GNO-Def), 2005–2006.; Director, Defense Information Systems Agency/Commander, Joint Task Force – Global Network Operations (DIRDISA/CDRJTF-GNO), 2006–2008. | 3 | 1973 (AFROTC) | 32 | (1949– ) |
| 48 | Terry L. Gabreski | | 1 Aug 2005 | Vice Commander, Air Force Materiel Command (VCOMAFMC), 2005–2009. | 4 | 1974 (OTS) | 31 | (1952– ) Daughter of Air Force brigadier general Alonzo J. Walter Jr. |
| * | Kevin P. Chilton | | 9 Aug 2005 | Commander, Eighth Air Force/Commander, Task Force 204/Joint Functional Component Commander for Space and Global Strike (CTF-204/JFCC SGS), 2005–2006. | 1 | 1976 (USAFA) | 29 | (1954– ) Promoted to general, 26 Jun 2006. |
| 49 | John L. Hudson | | 15 Aug 2005 | Commander, Aeronautical Systems Center/Program Executive Officer, Aircraft Procurement and Modernization (COMASC/PEO Aircraft), 2005–2009. | 4 | 1973 (USAFA) | 32 | (1950– ) Director, National Museum of the United States Air Force, 2010–2018. |
| 50 | David A. Deptula | | 1 Oct 2005 | Vice Commander, Pacific Air Forces/Commander, Joint Task Force-Support Forces Antarctica/Standing Joint Force Air Component Commander for U.S. Pacific Command (VCOMPACAF/CJTF-SFA/SJFACC USPACOM), 2005–2006.; Commander, George C. Kenney Headquarters (Provisional)/Vice Commander, Pacific Air Forces/Commander, Joint Task Force-Support Forces Antarctica/Standing Joint Force Air Component Commander for U.S. Pacific Command (COMKHQ(P)/VCOMPACAF/CJTF-SFA/SJFACC USPACOM), 2006.; Deputy Chief of Staff, Intelligence, Air Staff (DCS A2), 2006–2007.; Deputy Chief of Staff, Intelligence, Surveillance, and Reconnaissance, Air Staff (DCS A2), 2007–2010. | 5 | 1976 (USAFA) | 29 | (1952– ) |
| * | Douglas M. Fraser | | 11 Oct 2005 | Commander, Alaskan NORAD Region/Commander, Alaskan Command/Commander, Eleventh Air Force (CDRANR/CDRALCOM), 2005–2008.; Deputy Commander, U.S. Pacific Command (DCDRUSPACOM), 2008–2009. | 4 | 1975 (USAFA) | 31 | (1952– ) Promoted to general, 25 Jun 2009. |
| 51 | Frank G. Klotz | | 17 Oct 2005 | Vice Commander, Air Force Space Command (VCOMAFSPC), 2005–2007.; Assistant Vice Chief of Staff, U.S. Air Force/Director, Air Staff, U.S. Air Force (AVCSAF/AF/DS), 2007–2009.; Commander, Air Force Global Strike Command (COMAFGSC), 2009–2011. | 6 | 1973 (USAFA) (Note: Enlisted in U.S. Air Force Reserve in 1968, commissioned as second lieutenant in 1973.) | 32 | (1950– ) U.S. Under Secretary of Energy for Nuclear Security, 2014–2018. |
| * | Donald J. Hoffman | | 1 Nov 2005 | Military Deputy to the Assistant Secretary of the Air Force for Acquisition (MILDEP SAF/AQ), 2005–2008. | 3 | 1974 (USAFA) | 31 | (1952– ) Promoted to general, 21 Nov 2008. |
| * | Stephen R. Lorenz | | 1 Nov 2005 | Commander, Air University (COMAU), 2005–2008. | 3 | 1973 (USAFA) | 32 | (1951– ) Promoted to general, 2 Jul 2008. |
| 52 | Michael W. Peterson | | 1 Feb 2006 | Chief, Warfighting Integration/Chief Information Officer, Office of the Secretary of the Air Force (SAF/CIO A6), 2006–2008. | 2 | 1974 (AFROTC) | 32 | (1952– ) |
| * | Gary L. North | | 16 Feb 2006 | Commander, Ninth Air Force/Commander, U.S. Central Command Air Forces (COMUSCENTAF), 2006–2008.; Commander, Ninth Air Force/Commander, U.S. Air Forces Central (COMUSAFCENT), 2008–2009. | 3 | 1976 (AFROTC) | 30 | (1954– ) Promoted to general, 19 Aug 2009. |
| 53 | Ronald F. Sams | | 1 Mar 2006 | Inspector General, U.S. Air Force (AF/IG), 2006–2009. | 3 | 1972 (AFROTC) | 34 | (1949– ) |
| * | Craig R. McKinley | | 20 May 2006 | Director, Air National Guard (DIRANG), 2006–2008. | 2 | 1974 (AFROTC) | 32 | (1952– ) (Note: Served as Chief, National Guard Bureau (CNGB).) Promoted to general, 17 Nov 2008. |
| 54 | Robert J. Elder Jr. | | 13 Jun 2006 | Commander, Eighth Air Force/Joint Functional Component Commander for Space and Global Strike (JFCC SGS), 2006–2007.; Commander, Eighth Air Force/Commander, Task Force 204/Joint Functional Component Commander for Space and Global Strike (CTF-204/JFCC SGS), 2007–2009. | 3 | 1975 (AFROTC) | 31 | (1952– ) |
| 55 | James N. Soligan | | 26 Jun 2006 | Deputy Chief of Staff for Capability Development, Headquarters Supreme Allied Commander Transformation (DCOFS-CD), 2006–2009. | 3 | 1973 (USAFA) | 33 | (1951– ) |
| 56 | Norman R. Seip | | 7 Jul 2006 | Commander, Twelfth Air Force/Commander, Air Forces Southern (COMAFSOUTH), 2006–2008.; Commander, Twelfth Air Force (Air Forces Southern), 2008–2009. | 3 | 1974 (USAFA) | 32 | (1951– ) |
| 57 | Maurice L. McFann Jr. | | 26 Jul 2006 | Commander, Allied Air Component Command İzmir/Commander, Sixteenth Air and Space Expeditionary Task Force (COMAIR-COM İzmir), 2006–2009. | 3 | 1972 (OTS) | 34 | (1950– ) |
| 58 | James G. Roudebush | | 4 Aug 2006 | Surgeon General, U.S. Air Force (AF/SG), 2006–2009. | 3 | 1972 (AFROTC) | 34 | (1948– ) |
| 59 | Loyd S. Utterback | | 6 Oct 2006 | Commander, Thirteenth Air Force/Commander, Joint Task Force-Support Forces Antarctica/Joint Force Air Component Commander for U.S. Pacific Command (CJTF-SFA/JFACC USPACOM), 2006–2007.; Commander, Thirteenth Air Force (Air Forces Pacific)/Commander, Joint Task Force-Support Forces Antarctica/Joint Force Air Component Commander for U.S. Pacific Command (CJTF-SFA/JFACC USPACOM), 2007–2009. | 3 | 1975 (Texas A&M) | 31 | (1953– ) |
| * | Raymond E. Johns Jr. | | 10 Oct 2006 | Deputy Chief of Staff, Strategic Plans and Programs, Air Staff (DCS A5/8), 2006–2009. | 3 | 1977 (USAFA) | 29 | (1954– ) Promoted to general, 20 Nov 2009. |
| 60 | Kevin J. Sullivan | | 27 Jun 2007 | Deputy Chief of Staff, Logistics, Installations and Mission Support, Air Staff (DCS A4/7), 2007–2008. | 1 | 1974 (AFROTC) | 33 | (1951– ) (Note: Retired as major general, 2008.) |
| 61 | Glenn F. Spears | | 2 Nov 2007 | Deputy Commander, U.S. Southern Command (DCDRUSSOUTHCOM), 2007–2009.; Commander, Twelfth Air Force (Air Forces Southern), 2009–2011. | 4 | 1978 (USAFA) | 29 | (1956– ) |
| 62 | Ted F. Bowlds | | 7 Nov 2007 | Commander, Electronic Systems Center (COMESC), 2007–2011. | 4 | 1975 (AFROTC) | 32 | (1953– ) |
| 63 | Daniel J. Darnell | | 19 Nov 2007 | Deputy Chief of Staff, Operations, Plans and Requirements, Air Staff (DCS A3), 2007–2009.; Deputy Commander, U.S. Pacific Command (DCDRUSPACOM), 2009–2012. | 5 | 1975 (VMI) | 32 | (1953– ) |
| 64 | Donald C. Wurster | | 27 Nov 2007 | Commander, Air Force Special Operations Command (COMAFSOC), 2007–2011. | 4 | 1973 (USAFA) | 34 | (1951– ) Brother of Coast Guard vice admiral Charles D. Wurster. |
| * | William L. Shelton | | 20 Dec 2007 | Commander, Fourteenth Air Force (Air Forces Strategic-Space)/Commander, Joint Functional Component Command for Space (COMAFSTRAT-Space/CDRJFCC Space), 2007–2008.; Commander, Fourteenth Air Force (Air Forces Strategic)/Commander, Joint Functional Component Command for Space (COMAFSTRAT/CDRJFCC Space), 2008.; Chief, Warfighting Integration/Chief Information Officer, Office of the Secretary of the Air Force (SAF/CIO A6), 2008–2009.; Assistant Vice Chief of Staff, U.S. Air Force/Director, Air Staff, U.S. Air Force (AVCSAF/AF/DS), 2009–2011. | 4 | 1976 (USAFA) | 31 | (1954– ) Promoted to general, 5 Jan 2011. |
| 65 | Richard Y. Newton III | | 7 Jan 2008 | Deputy Chief of Staff, Manpower and Personnel, Air Staff (DCS A1), 2008–2009.; Assistant Vice Chief of Staff, U.S. Air Force/Director, Air Staff, U.S. Air Force (AVCSAF/AF/DS), 2009–2012. | 4 | 1978 (USAFA) | 30 | |
| * | Edward A. Rice Jr. | | 25 Feb 2008 | Commander, U.S. Forces Japan/Commander, Fifth Air Force (COMUSFJ), 2008–2010. | 2 | 1978 (USAFA) | 30 | (1956– ) Promoted to general, 17 Nov 2010. |
| 66 | Dana T. Atkins | | 9 May 2008 | Commander, Alaskan NORAD Region/Commander, Alaskan Command/Commander, Eleventh Air Force (CDRANR/CDRALCOM), 2008–2011. | 3 | 1978 (AFROTC) (Note: Enlisted in 1977, commissioned as officer in 1978.) | 30 | (1955– ) |
| 67 | John T. Sheridan | | 16 May 2008 | Commander, Space and Missile Systems Center (COMSMC), 2008–2011. | 3 | 1975 (AFROTC) (Note: Received commission, May 1973; reported for active duty, August 1975.) | 33 | |
| 68 | Allen G. Peck | | 16 Jun 2008 | Commander, Air University (COMAU), 2008–2011. | 3 | 1975 (USAFA) | 33 | |
| 69 | Vern M. Findley II | | 20 Jun 2008 | Vice Commander, Air Mobility Command (VCOMAMC), 2008–2011. | 3 | 1976 (AFROTC) | 32 | (1954– ) |
| 70 | Charles E. Stenner Jr. | | 24 Jun 2008 | Chief, Air Force Reserve/Commander, Air Force Reserve Command (CAFR/COMAFRC), 2008–2012. | 4 | 1973 (OTS) | 35 | |
| * | Philip M. Breedlove | | 21 Jul 2008 | Commander, Third Air Force (Air Forces Europe), 2008–2009.; Deputy Chief of Staff, Operations, Plans and Requirements, Air Staff (DCS A3), 2009–2011. | 3 | 1977 (AFROTC) | 31 | (1955– ) (Note: Served as Supreme Allied Commander Europe (SACEUR).) Promoted to general, 14 Jan 2011. |
| 71 | Jack L. Rives | | 23 Jul 2008 | Judge Advocate General, U.S. Air Force (TJAG), 2006–2010. | 2 | 1977 (AFROTC) (Note: Received commission, 1974; reported for active duty, 1977.) | 31 | (1952– ) Executive Director, American Bar Association, 2010–2023. |
| 72 | Mark D. Shackelford | | 6 Oct 2008 | Military Deputy to the Assistant Secretary of the Air Force for Acquisition (MILDEP SAF/AQ), 2008–2011. | 3 | 1977 (USAFA) | 31 | |
| * | Paul J. Selva | | 8 Oct 2008 | Assistant to the Chairman of the Joint Chiefs of Staff (ACJCS), 2008–2011.; Vice Commander, Pacific Air Forces (VCOMPACAF), 2011–2012. | 4 | 1980 (USAFA) | 28 | (1958– ) (Note: Served as Vice Chairman, Joint Chiefs of Staff (VJCS).) Promoted to general, 29 Nov 2012. |
| 73 | Jeffrey A. Remington | | 24 Nov 2008 | Deputy Commander, United Nations Command/Deputy Commander, U.S. Forces Korea/Commander, Air Component Command, ROK/U.S. Combined Forces Command/Commander, Seventh Air Force (DCDRUNC/DCDRUSFK/AIRCDRCFC), 2008–2012. | 4 | 1977 (USAFA) | 31 | (c. 1955– ) |
| * | Mark A. Welsh III | | 9 Dec 2008 | Associate Director, Military Affairs, Central Intelligence Agency (ADMA), 2008–2010. | 2 | 1976 (USAFA) | 32 | (1953– ) Promoted to general, 13 Dec 2010. Dean, Bush School of Government and Public Service, 2016–2023; President, Texas A&M University, 2023–2025. |
| 74 | Larry D. James | | 9 Dec 2008 | Commander, Fourteenth Air Force (Air Forces Strategic)/Commander, Joint Functional Component Command for Space (COMAFSTRAT/CDRJFCC Space), 2008–2011.; Deputy Chief of Staff, Intelligence, Surveillance, and Reconnaissance, Air Staff (DCS A2), 2011–2013. | 5 | 1978 (USAFA) | 30 | (1956– ) Deputy Director, Jet Propulsion Laboratory, 2013–2024. |
| 75 | Loren M. Reno | | 16 Jan 2009 | Deputy Chief of Staff, Logistics, Installations and Mission Support, Air Staff (DCS A4/7), 2009–2011. | 2 | 1974 (OTS) | 34 | |
| 76 | Harry M. Wyatt III | | 1 Feb 2009 | Director, Air National Guard (DIRANG), 2009–2013. | 4 | 1971 (OTS) | 38 | (1949– ) |
| 77 | John C. Koziol | | 17 Feb 2009 | Deputy Under Secretary of Defense (Intelligence) for Joint and Coalition Warfighter Support/Director, Intelligence, Surveillance, and Reconnaissance Task Force, (DIRISR TF) 2009–2012. | 3 | 1976 (Norwich) | 33 | (1953– ) |
| 78 | Michael C. Gould | | 9 Jun 2009 | Superintendent, U.S. Air Force Academy, 2009–2013. | 4 | 1976 (USAFA) | 33 | (1953– ) |
| 79 | Marc E. Rogers | | 26 Jun 2009 | Inspector General, U.S. Air Force (AF/IG), 2009–2012. | 3 | 1978 (AFROTC) (Note: Enlisted in 1974, commissioned as second lieutenant in 1978.) | 31 | (1954– ) |
| 80 | William T. Lord | | 27 Jul 2009 | Chief, Warfighting Integration/Chief Information Officer, Office of the Secretary of the Air Force (SAF/CIO A6), 2009–2012. | 3 | 1977 (USAFA) | 32 | (1955– ) |
| 81 | Charles B. Green | | 3 Aug 2009 | Surgeon General, U.S. Air Force (AF/SG), 2009–2012. | 3 | 1978 (direct) | 31 | (1955– ) |
| * | Gilmary M. Hostage III | | 5 Aug 2009 | Commander, U.S. Air Forces Central Command (COMUSAFCENT), 2009–2011. | 2 | 1977 (AFROTC) | 32 | (1955– ) Promoted to general, 13 Sep 2011. |
| 82 | Thomas J. Owen | | 14 Aug 2009 | Commander, Aeronautical Systems Center/Program Executive Officer, Aircraft Procurement and Modernization (COMASC/PEO Aircraft), 2009–2012. | 3 | 1978 (USAFA) | 31 | |
| 83 | Robert R. Allardice | | 19 Aug 2009 | Commander, Eighteenth Air Force (Air Forces Transportation), 2009–2011.; Vice Commander, Air Mobility Command (VCOMAMC), 2011–2013. | 4 | 1980 (USAFA) | 29 | (c. 1958– ) |
| * | Frank Gorenc | | 24 Aug 2009 | Commander, Third Air Force (Air Forces Europe), 2009–2012.; Assistant Vice Chief of Staff, U.S. Air Force/Director, Air Staff, U.S. Air Force (AVCSAF/AF/DS), 2012–2013. | 4 | 1979 (USAFA) | 30 | (1957– ) Promoted to general, 2 Aug 2013. Brother of Air Force major general Stanley Gorenc. |
| * | Herbert J. Carlisle | | 2 Sep 2009 | Commander, Thirteenth Air Force (Air Forces Pacific)/Commander, Joint Task Force-Support Forces Antarctica/Joint Force Air Component Commander for U.S. Pacific Command (CJTF-SFA/JFACC USPACOM), 2009–2011.; Deputy Chief of Staff, Operations, Plans and Requirements, Air Staff (DCS A3), 2011–2012. | 3 | 1979 (USAFA) | 30 | (1957– ) Promoted to general, 2 Aug 2012. |
| 84 | William J. Rew | | 19 Oct 2009 | Vice Commander, Air Combat Command (VCOMACC), 2009–2013. | 4 | 1979 (USAFA) | 30 | |
| 85 | Christopher D. Miller | | 16 Nov 2009 | Deputy Chief of Staff, Strategic Plans and Programs, Air Staff (DCS A5/8), 2009–2012. | 3 | 1980 (USAFA) | 29 | |
| * | Janet C. Wolfenbarger | | 3 Dec 2009 | Vice Commander, Air Force Materiel Command (VCOMAFMC), 2009–2011.; Military Deputy to the Assistant Secretary of the Air Force for Acquisition (MILDEP SAF/AQ), 2011–2012. | 3 | 1980 (USAFA) | 29 | (1958– ) Promoted to general, 5 Jun 2012. |
| 86 | Ralph J. Jodice II | | 4 Dec 2009 | Commander, Allied Air Component Command İzmir/Commander, Sixteenth Air and Space Expeditionary Task Force (COMAIR-COM İzmir), 2009–2013. | 4 | 1976 (AFROTC) | 33 | (1955– ) |

== Background ==
=== Three-star positions, elevations and reductions ===
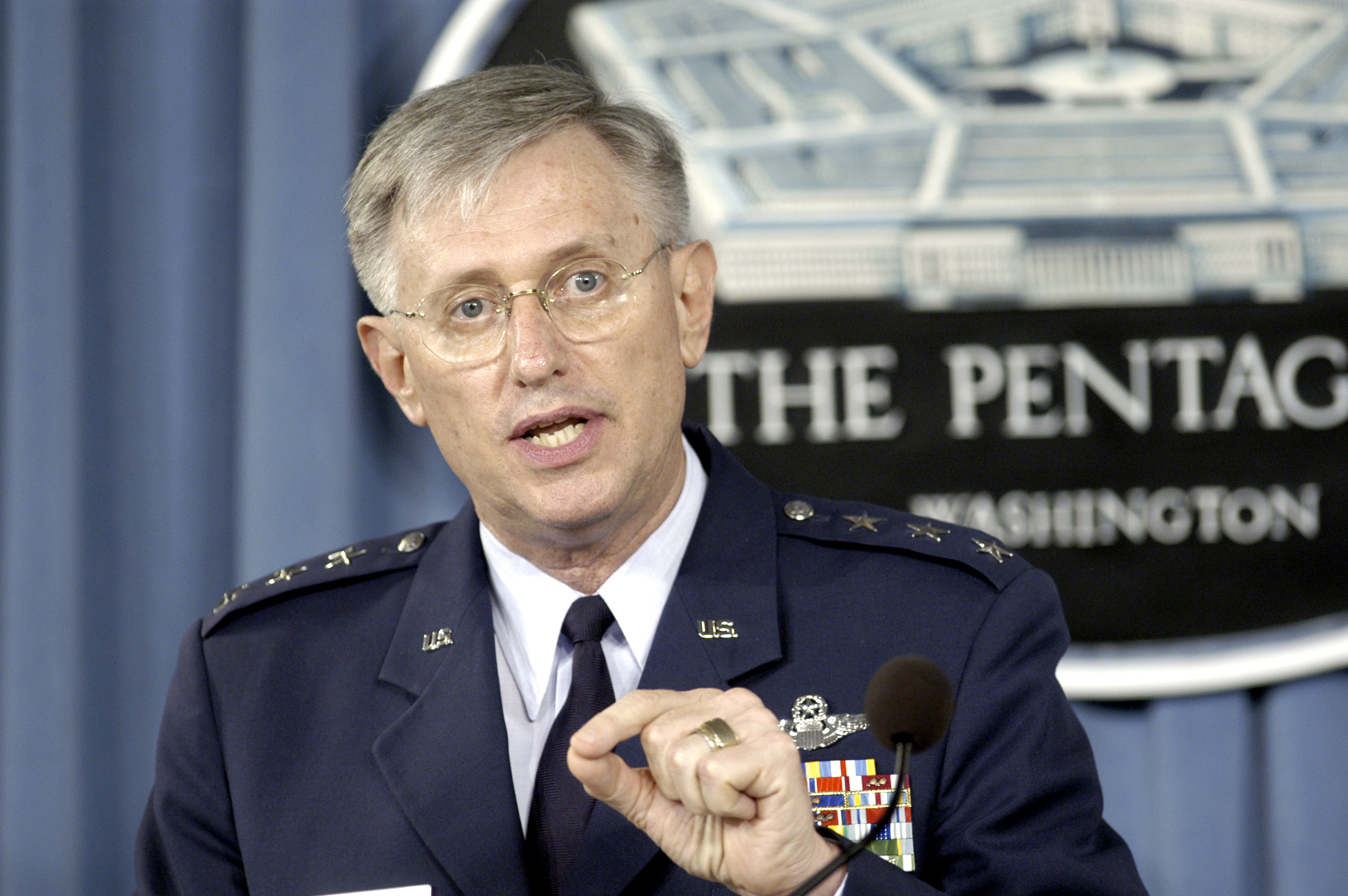
Lt Gen Roger A. Brady speaks to reporters on an investigation into the handling of religious issues at the United States Air Force Academy on 22 June 2005.

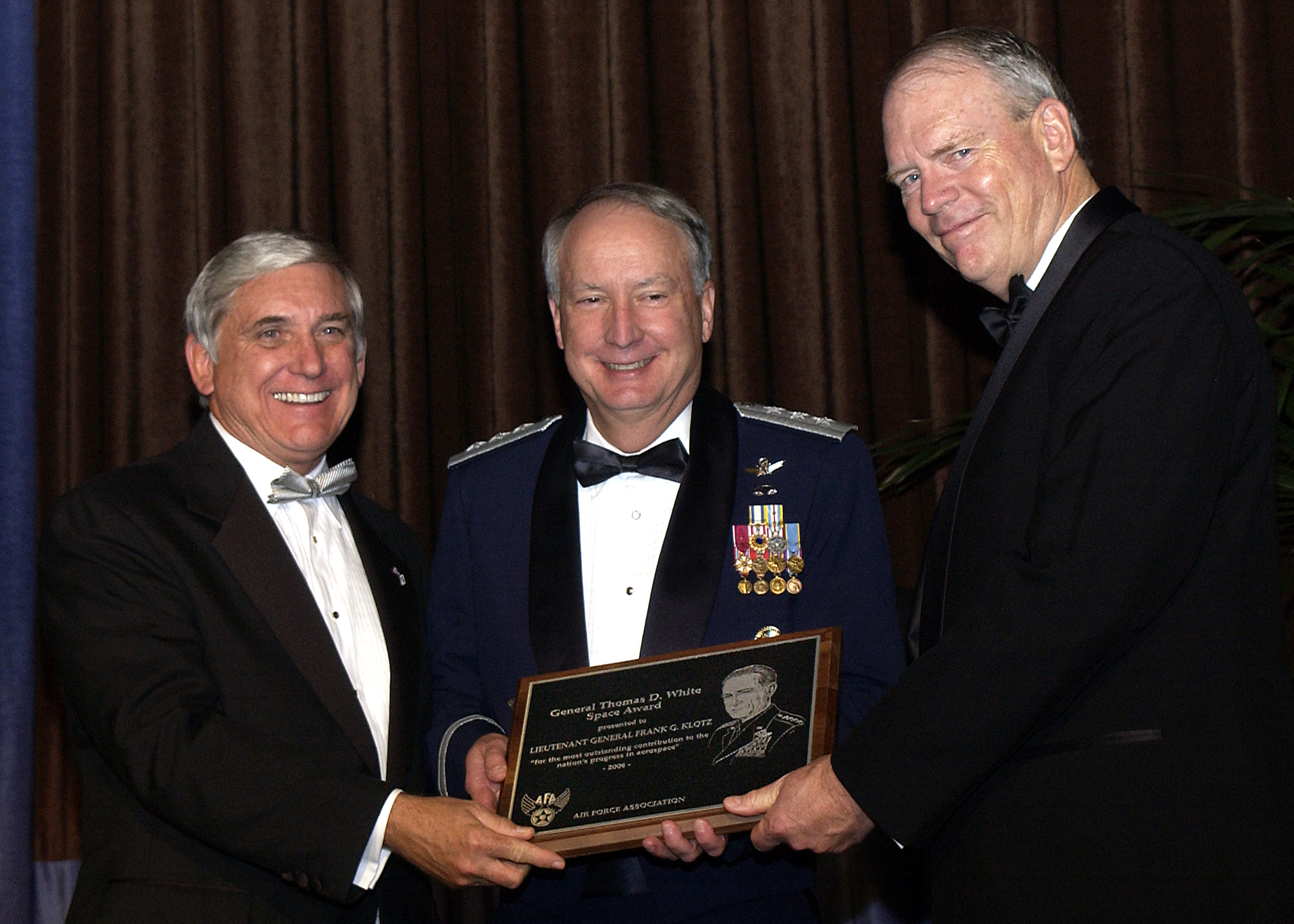
Lt Gen Frank G. Klotz (center) is presented with the General Thomas D. White U.S. Air Force Space Trophy on 17 November 2006.

Several notable developments relating to three-star positions of the United States Air Force occurred between 2000 and 2009.

- Air Force Global Strike Command (AFGSC) was activated on 7 August 2009 as a three-star command, in response to the 2007 United States Air Force nuclear weapons incident and related incidents. Lieutenant General Frank G. Klotz, who was confirmed by the Senate in May 2009, assumed command of AFGSC that same August.
- The Floyd D. Spence National Defense Authorization Act for Fiscal Year 2001 elevated the leaders of all service reserve and National Guard components to three-star grade under standard promotion authority. (Note: Special promotion authority to three-star rank for service reserve and National Guard leaders had existed since 1999 under 10 U.S.C. § 12505; the 2001 NDAA repealed this section and assigned the affected positions with statutory three-star grades under standard promotion authority.) Thus, the sitting chief of Air Force Reserve, Major General James E. Sherrard III, and the first Air National Guard director appointed after the Act's passage, Major General Daniel James III were promoted to lieutenant general in May 2001 and June 2002 respectively.
- The National Defense Authorization Act for Fiscal Year 2008 elevated all judge advocates general of the service branches to three-star grade. Major General Jack L. Rives, the incumbent judge advocate general of the Air Force, was nominated for promotion to lieutenant general in July 2008, and assumed the rank in July 2008.
- U.S. Air Forces Central Command (USAFCENT) was separated from Ninth Air Force (9 AF) on 5 August 2009, amid rising military commitments in Iraq and Afghanistan. This allowed USAFCENT's three-star commander to focus on warfighting in the region, and 9 AF's two-star commander to better train and equip Middle East-bound forces within the United States. On the separation date, Lieutenant General Gary L. North relinquished command of USAFCENT to Lieutenant General Gilmary M. Hostage III and 9 AF to Major General William L. Holland.

=== Senate confirmations ===
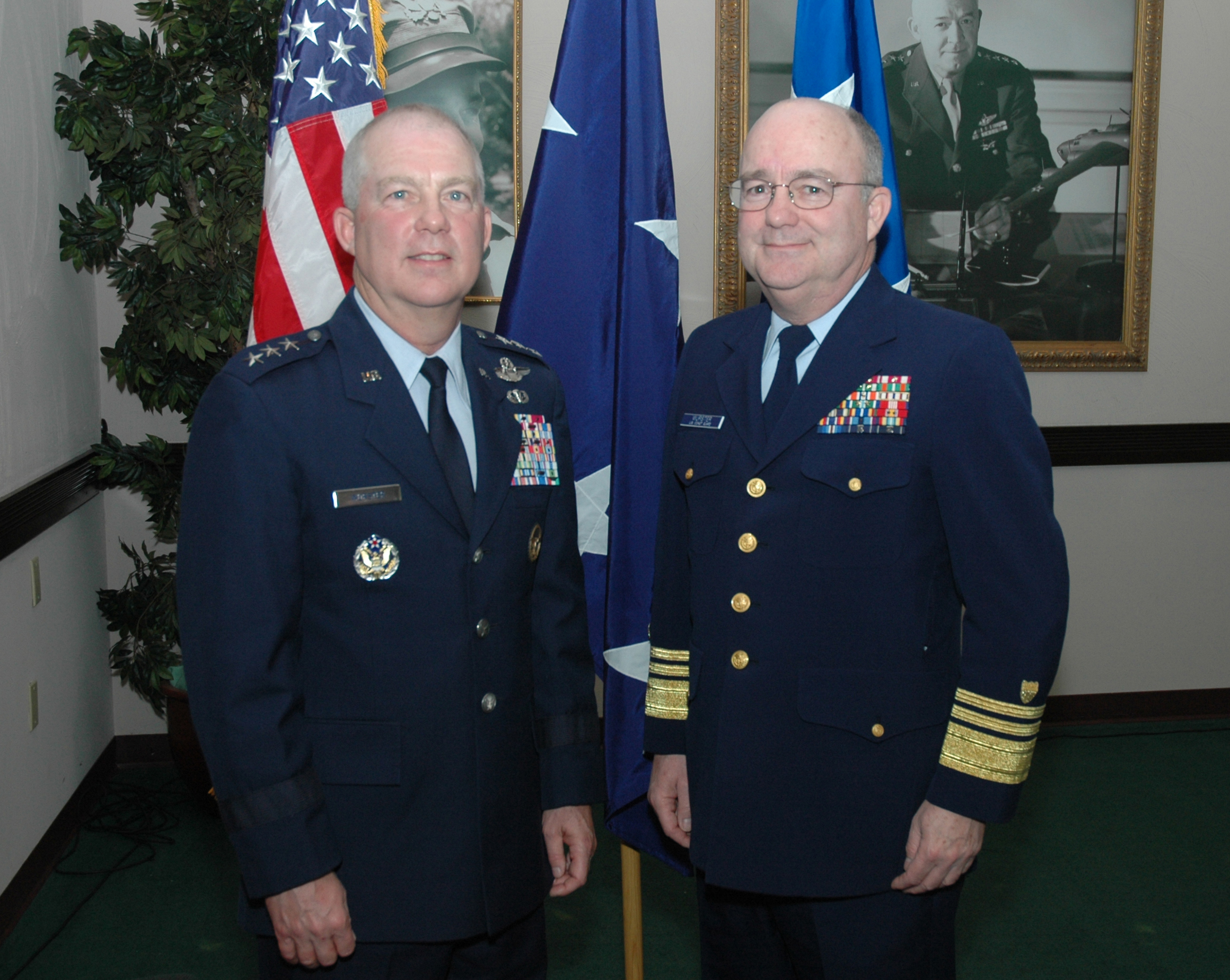
Lt Gen Donald C. Wurster (left) with his brother, Coast Guard VADM Charles D. Wurster (right), 27 November 2007.

Military nominations are considered by the Senate Armed Services Committee. While it is rare for three-star or four-star nominations to face even token opposition in the Senate, nominations that do face opposition due to controversy surrounding the nominee in question are typically withdrawn. Nominations that are not withdrawn are allowed to expire without action at the end of the legislative session.

- The nomination of Major General Joseph J. Taluto to succeed Clyde A. Vaughn as director of the Army National Guard in 2010 was withdrawn due to public controversy and subsequent Senate inaction over his handling of the deaths of Phillip Esposito and Louis Allen.
- Major General Robert T. Clark's nomination to be commanding general of Fifth United States Army was twice delayed for an Armed Services committee vote due to concerns over Clark's inadequate response to the 1999 murder of Barry Winchell, a gay serviceman, when he was commander of Fort Campbell. Clark was eventually confirmed for promotion with the support of then-committee chairman John Warner after closed-session hearings were held.

Additionally, events that take place after Senate confirmation may still delay or even prevent the nominee from assuming office.

- For example, Major General John G. Rossi, who had been confirmed for promotion to lieutenant general and assignment as the commanding general of the U.S. Army Space and Missile Defense Command in April 2016 committed suicide two days before his scheduled promotion and assumption of command. As a result, the then incumbent commander of USASMDC, Lieutenant General David L. Mann, remained in command beyond statutory term limits until another nominee, Major General James H. Dickinson was confirmed by the Senate.
- Vice Admiral Scott A. Stearney assumed command of U.S. Naval Forces Central Command, Fifth Fleet, and Combined Maritime Forces in May 2018. His death in December of the same year resulted in the speedy confirmation of Rear Admiral James J. Malloy in the same month for appointment to three-star rank as his replacement.

== Legislative history ==
The following list of Congressional legislation includes all acts of Congress pertaining to appointments to the grade of lieutenant general in the United States Air Force from 2000 to 2009. (Note: Legislative history compiled from the U.S. Congress official website and U.S. Government Publishing Office official website.)

Each entry lists an act of Congress, its citation in the United States Statutes at Large, and a summary of the act's relevance, with officers affected by the act bracketed where applicable. Positions listed without reference to rank are assumed to be eligible for officers of three-star grade or higher.

List of legislation on appointments of lieutenant generals from 2000 to 2009
| Legislation | Citation | Summary |
|---|---|---|
| Act of October 30, 2000 [Floyd D. Spence National Defense Authorization Act for Fiscal Year 2001] | 114 Stat. 1654A–105; 114 Stat. 1654A–106 | Raised statutory rank of the chief of Air Force Reserve, under standard promotion procedures, to lieutenant general (James E. Sherrard III).; Raised statutory rank of the directors of the Army National Guard and Air National Guard, under standard promotion procedures, to lieutenant general (Daniel James III).; Repealed special requirement for senior reserve component officers, (Note: referring to the chiefs of service reserve components (Army Reserve, Marine Forces Reserve, Naval Reserve, and Air Force Reserve) and directors of the Army and Air National Guard) per Section 12505 of Title 10, for appointment to grade of lieutenant general or vice admiral.; Increased percentage of general officers in the Army or Air Force that may be appointed above grade of major general from 15% to 15.7%. |
| Act of December 2, 2002 [Bob Stump National Defense Authorization Act for Fiscal Year 2003] | 116 Stat. 2487; 116 Stat. 2525 | Established a Department of Defense Test Resource Management Center and assigned director statutory grade of lieutenant general or vice admiral.; Exempted the senior military assistant to the secretary of defense from number and percentage limitations on general or flag officers, if serving in grade of lieutenant general or vice admiral. |
| Act of January 6, 2006 [National Defense Authorization Act for Fiscal Year 2006] | 119 Stat. 3226 | Prohibited frocking of officers below grade of major general or rear admiral to grades above major general or rear admiral. |
| Act of January 28, 2008 [National Defense Authorization Act for Fiscal Year 2008] | 122 Stat. 94; 122 Stat. 115; 122 Stat. 278 | Raised statutory rank of the judge advocate general of the Air Force to lieutenant general (Jack L. Rives).; Increased percentage of general or flag officers that may be appointed above grade of major general or rear admiral from 15.7% to 16.3%.; Allowed officers serving in grade of lieutenant general, general, vice admiral, or admiral to continue holding such position for up to 60 days following reassignment from such position, unless placed sooner in another designated position.; Required one deputy commander of the combatant command covering the geographic area of responsibility of which includes the United States (Note: refers to the United States Northern Command (USNORTHCOM).) to be a National Guard officer eligible for promotion to lieutenant general. |
| Act of October 14, 2008 [Duncan Hunter National Defense Authorization Act for Fiscal Year 2009] | 122 Stat. 4433; 122 Stat. 4435; 122 Stat. 4436 | Increased percentage of general officers in the Air Force that may be appointed above grade of major general from 16.3% to 16.4%.; Revised cap on total number of authorized Air Force general officers to be reduced to 208, of which 43 may be appointed in grade of lieutenant general pending a congressional report by the secretary of defense.; Authorized appointment of up to 68 officers in grade of lieutenant general or vice admiral for joint duty assignments. |
| Act of October 28, 2009 [National Defense Authorization Act for Fiscal Year 2010] | 123 Stat. 2273 | Capped total number of Air Force general officers who may be appointed in grade of lieutenant general at 43, pursuant to changes made under NDAA 2009. |

== See also ==
- Lieutenant general (United States)
- General officers in the United States
- List of active duty United States four-star officers
- List of active duty United States three-star officers
- List of United States Air Force four-star generals
- List of lieutenant generals in the United States Air Force before 1960
- List of United States Air Force lieutenant generals from 2010 to 2019
- List of United States Air Force lieutenant generals since 2020
- List of United States Space Force lieutenant generals
- List of United States military leaders by rank

== Bibliography ==
- Air Force Register, Washington, D.C.: U.S. Government Publishing Office, 1979
