= Tad J. Oelstrom =

United States Air Force general

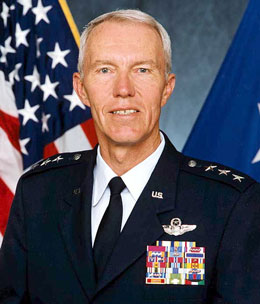
- Tad J. Oelstrom
- Born: February 14, 1943 (age 83); Milwaukee, Wisconsin, U.S.
- Military career
- Allegiance: United States of America
- Branch: United States Air Force
- Service years: 1965-2000
- Rank: Lieutenant general
- Commands: Superintendent, U.S. Air Force Academy
- Conflicts: Vietnam War; Gulf War
- Awards: Air Force Distinguished Service Medal; Defense Superior Service Medal; Legion of Merit; Distinguished Flying Cross (2); Air Medal (16)
- Other work: Director of the National Security Program, John F. Kennedy School of Government

Tad J. Oelstrom (born February 14, 1943) is a retired United States Air Force lieutenant general who served as the director of the National Security Program at the John F. Kennedy School of Government, Harvard University. He also served as the fourteenth superintendent of the United States Air Force Academy in Colorado Springs, Colorado.

== Training and education ==
Oelstrom was born in Milwaukee, Wisconsin He graduated from the United States Air Force Academy in 1965 and holds a Master of business administration degree from Auburn University, Alabama. He is a graduate of the U.S. Air Force's Squadron Officer School, Air Command and Staff College, the Industrial College of the Armed Forces and the U.S. Army War College.

== Military career ==
Oelstrom attended pilot training at Vance Air Force Base, Oklahoma, and went on to advanced training in the F-4 Phantom II. From 1970 to 1971, he was assigned to Da Nang Air Base, South Vietnam. He has served as commander of the 337th Tactical Fighter Squadron, Seymour Johnson Air Force Base, North Carolina; commander of the 81st Tactical Fighter Wing, RAF Bentwaters, England; commander of the 4404th Composite Wing, Dhahran Air Base, Saudi Arabia; commander of the 86th Fighter Wing, Ramstein Air Base, Germany; and commander of Third Air Force, RAF Mildenhall, England. Oelstrom held staff positions at Tactical Air Command, United States European Command and United States Central Command. He also served as an exchange officer with the British Royal Air Force. He retired from active duty on August 1, 2000.

Oelstrom is a command pilot with more than 4,400 flying hours in aircraft including the T-37, T-38, F-4, A-10, F-15 Eagle, F-16 Fighting Falcon and the Hawker Hunter.

== Awards and decorations ==
Oelstrom's decorations include the Air Force Distinguished Service Medal, the Defense Superior Service Medal, the Legion of Merit, the Distinguished Flying Cross with oak leaf cluster, the Meritorious Service Medal with four oak leaf clusters, and the Air Medal with 15 oak leaf clusters.

- Air Force Distinguished Service Medal
- Defense Superior Service Medal
- Legion of Merit
- Distinguished Flying Cross with oak leaf cluster
- Meritorious Service Medal with four oak leaf clusters
- Air Medal with fifteen oak leaf clusters

| Preceded by Paul E. Stein | Superintendent of the U.S. Air Force Academy; 1997—2000 | Succeeded by John R. Dallager |
