= Jay B. Silveria =

US Air Force lieutenant general

Lieutenant General Jay B. Silveria
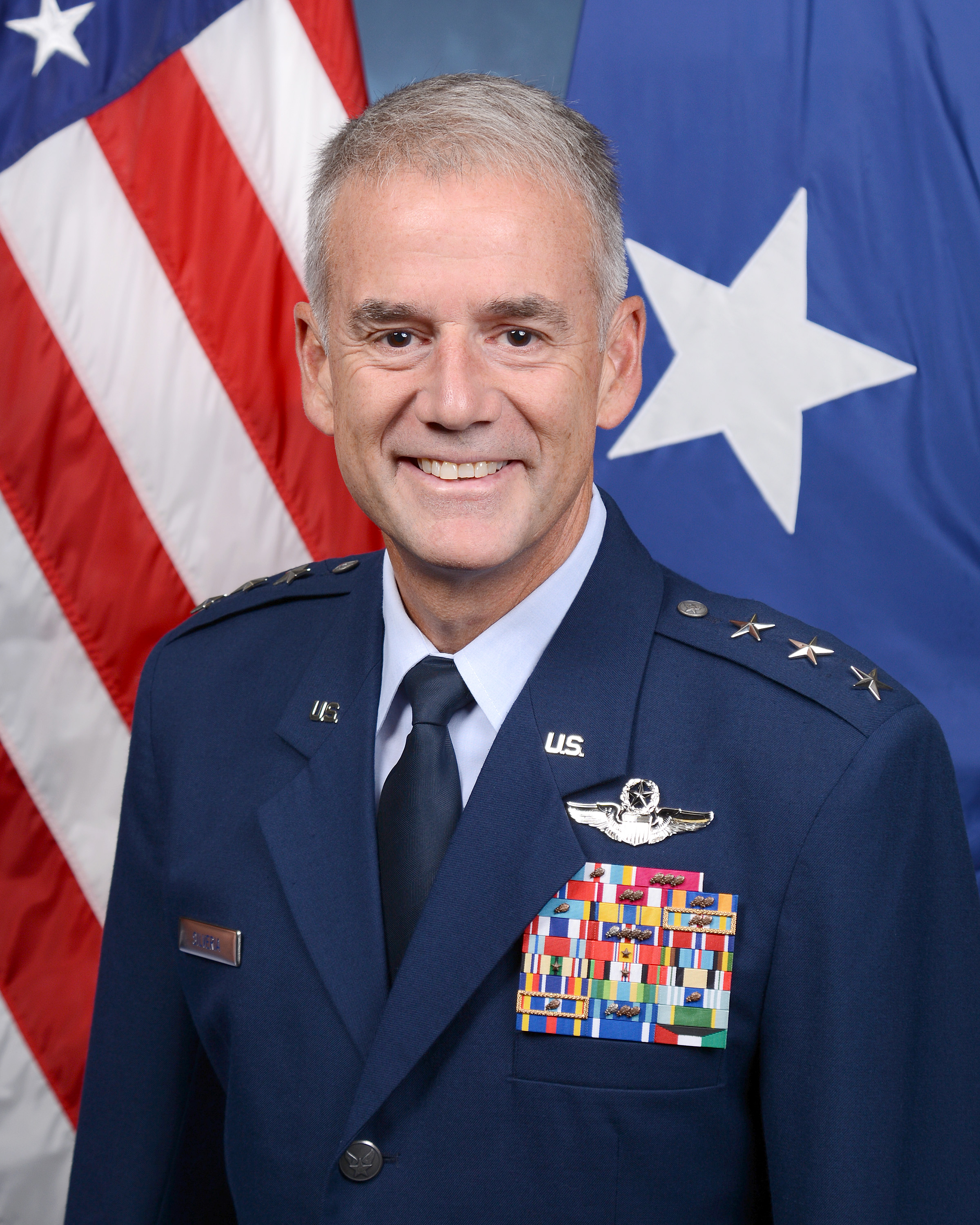
- U.S. Air Force photo, c. 2017

20th Superintendent of the United States Air Force Academy
- In office August 11, 2017 – September 24, 2020
- President: Donald Trump
- Preceded by: Michelle D. Johnson
- Succeeded by: Richard M. Clark

Personal details
- Born: Jay Benton Silveria c. 1963 (age 62–63) Houston, Texas, U.S.
- Military career
- Education: United States Air Force Academy (BS); Syracuse University (MS)
- Allegiance: United States of America
- Branch: United States Air Force
- Service years: 1985–2020
- Rank: Lieutenant General
- Nickname: Tonto
- Commands: Superintendent, USAF Academy; United States Air Force Warfare Center; 48th Fighter Wing; 32d Air and Space Operations Center; 492nd Fighter Squadron
- Awards: Air Force Distinguished Service Medal; Defense Superior Service Medal (2); Legion of Merit (4); Bronze Star Medal

Jay Benton Silveria (born c. 1963) is a retired lieutenant general in the United States Air Force who has served as president of the University of Arkansas System since 2025. He previously served as superintendent of the Air Force Academy from 2017 to 2020. His previous commands include deputy commander of the United States Air Forces Central Command, commander of the United States Air Force Warfare Center, and commander of 48th Fighter Wing. Rated as a command pilot, Silvera has more than 3,900 flying hours.

In September 2017, Silveria received national acclaim for his speech to the cadet wing at Mitchell Hall. Silveria admonished the cadet wing for an event which transpired at the Air Force Academy Preparatory School, where a preparatory school cadet candidate submitted accusations of racism. Silveria's speech quickly garnered national attention, as he scolded the Air Force Academy cadet wing and demanded the "racists... to get out." Shortly thereafter, however, the claimant at the Air Force Academy Preparatory School confessed that the event was a hoax.

He served as Executive Director of the Washington, D.C., branch of Texas A&M University’s Bush School of Government and Public Service until January 2025. On November 18, 2024, the Board of Trustees for the University of Arkansas System announced that Silveria would succeed Donald Bobbitt as the System’s president. On November 5, 2026, the board of trustees of Purdue University announced that Silveria would become the university's 14th president, effective February 1, 2027.

== Education ==
The son of a master sergeant, Silveria is a 1981 graduate of Lakenheath American High School in England, where he participated in soccer, baseball, forensics, drama, and the National Honor Society; he was voted "Most Talented" by his classmates.

Silveria earned a Bachelor of Science degree in 1985 from the U.S. Air Force Academy in Colorado Springs, Colorado. In 1997, he received a Master of Social Science degree from the Maxwell School of Citizenship and Public Affairs of Syracuse University. He later attended the National War College at Fort Lesley J. McNair, in Washington, D.C., and graduated in 2005.

== Military career ==
Throughout his military career, Silveria has held a number of positions in the USAF as a pilot and in command roles. He was promoted to first lieutenant in May 1987, and then captain in 1989. He was an instructor pilot at Williams Air Force Base, Arizona, in the late 1980s, where he flew Cessna T-37 aircraft for the 96th Flying Training Squadron. At the time, T-37s were a primary training aircraft for the USAF. Between 1991 and 1995, he served at Seymour Johnson AFB, North Carolina, where he flew F-15E Strike Eagles for the 334th Fighter Squadron, completing multiple deployments during Operation SOUTHERN WATCH.

Along with a promotion to major in 1997, Silveria assumed the position of aide-de-camp to the Supreme Allied Commander Europe and commander, United States European Command, Supreme Headquarters Allied Powers Europe, in Mons, Belgium. He held this position until July 1999. Silveria was promoted to lieutenant colonel in May 2000 while a student at the Air Command and Staff College. After graduating from the Air Command and Staff College in June 2000, Silveria was assigned to RAF Lakenheath, England, from until July 2004. While there, he served as director of operations of the 48th Operations Support Squadron, as commander of the 492nd Fighter Squadron, and as deputy commander of the 48th Mission Support Group. Shortly after graduating from the National War College in 2005, Silveria was promoted to colonel. He then served as the commander of the 32d Air and Space Operations Center at Ramstein Air Base, Germany, from June 2005 to January 2006, before returning to RAF Lakenheath in England to serve as vice commander of the 48th Fighter Wing from January 2006 to July 2007. From July 2007 to August 2008, Silveria served as special assistant to the commander, United States European Command, in Mons, Belgium. In August 2008, he took command of the 48th Fighter Wing, RAF Lakenheath, England.

In July 2010, Silveria was assigned as inspector general, Air Combat Command, at Langley Air Force Base, Virginia. Shortly after, in September 2010, he was promoted to brigadier general. From March 2012 to March 2013, Silveria served as director, Security Assistance in the Office of Security Cooperation-Iraq. From April 2013 to February 2014, he served as vice commander, 14th Air Force. From February 2014 to April 2016, Silveria served as the commanding general of the United States Air Force Warfare Center, Nellis AFB, Nevada. He had been promoted to major general in June 2014. From April 2016 to May 2017, Silveria served as deputy commander, U.S. Air Forces Central Command and as deputy commander, Combined Air Force Component, U.S. Central Command. In August 2017, Silveria was promoted to lieutenant general and began serving in his final assignment as Superintendent of the USAF Academy. Silveria retired from the United States Air Force on November 1, 2020, and Lieutenant General Richard M. Clark succeeded him as Superintendent.

== Post-military career ==
Silveria served as Executive Director of the Washington, D.C., branch of Texas A&M University’s Bush School of Government and Public Service until January 2025.

On November 18, 2024, the Board of Trustees for the University of Arkansas System announced that Silveria would succeed Donald Bobbitt as the System’s president.

On November 5, 2026, the Board of Trustees for Purdue University announced that Silveria would be the 14th president of the university, taking over from interim president Mitch Daniels, who returned to the university as acting president after the unexpected departure of the university's 13th president, Mung Chiang.

Military offices
Preceded by Thomas F. Gould	Vice Commander of the Fourteenth Air Force; 2013–2014	Succeeded by Steven D. Garland
Preceded by Jeffrey G. Lofgren	Commander of the United States Air Force Warfare Center; 2014–2016	Succeeded by Glen D. VanHerck
Preceded by Scott J. Zobrist	Deputy Commander of the United States Air Forces Central Command; 2016–2017	Succeeded by David S. Nahom
Preceded by Michelle D. Johnson	20th Superintendent of the United States Air Force Academy; 2017–2020	Succeeded by Richard M. Clark
