= Peter J. N. Sinclair =

British economist (1946–2020)

- Born: Peter James Niven Sinclair
- Died: 31 March 2020
- Occupation: Economist
- Employer: Brasenose College; University of Birmingham (1994–)

Peter James Niven Sinclair (18 September 1946 – 31 March 2020) was a British economist. He was Professor, and subsequently Emeritus Professor, in Economics at the University of Birmingham. Previously, he had been a fellow and tutor at Brasenose College, Oxford.

== Early life and education ==
Sinclair grew up in London and Norfolk and was educated at Gresham's School and the University of Oxford, where he gained his BA and doctorate. His first job was in the export department of Linde AG in Germany. This sharpened his lifelong interest in international economics.

== Career ==
Peter Sinclair taught at Oxford from 1970 to 1994, mainly in economic theory, monetary policy and international economics, as fellow and tutor in Economics at Brasenose College. In 1994 he became Professor of Economics at the University of Birmingham. He retired in 2012, but continued teaching as an Emeritus Professor until his illness and death in March 2020.

Sinclair published widely on a range of topics in economics, including the optimal rate of inflation, central bank independence, the costs and benefits of monetary union, and international trade policy. He became Director of the Bank of England's Centre for Central Banking Studies in 2000 where he taught central bank staff from all over the world, both in London and overseas. Sinclair maintained a connection with the Bank of England after leaving CCBS in 2008, including as a visiting academic, advising on research and teaching graduate entrants for many years. He also advised numerous overseas central banks. He contributed to a number of CCBS and Bank of England publications, including the Bank's Quarterly Bulletin, often providing an academic's perspective on contemporary monetary issues.

He was the author of numerous articles and books on economics, one written with his first wife, the late economist Shelagh Heffernan, who was Professor of Banking and Finance at the Cass Business School, City University London. His main research interests included inflation, unemployment, and tax questions, often in the open economy setting. He served as a consultant to the Financial Services Authority, the Treasury and the U.S. Department of Labor. A visiting professor at the University of British Columbia and Queen's University in Canada, he also lectured in China, France, Germany, Greece, Ireland, Italy, Japan, Lesotho, Poland, Russia, and the United States. He was visiting professor at the London School of Economics and University of Warwick, and chairman of the Royal Economic Society Easter School, and the International Economics Study Group. In 2016 he married the environmental artist, Jayne Ivimey.

His non-economics interests included architecture, history, and languages.

== Former students ==
Sinclair's most notable former student was David Cameron, who described Sinclair as "one of the cleverest people I ever met". Others include King Letsie III, Camilla Cavendish, Peter Conradi, Diane Coyle, Dieter Helm, Tim Harford, Lieutenant General Michelle D. Johnson, Dave Ramsden, Guy Spier, Abhisit Vejjajiva and a prominent Nepali economist and Asia Times opinion writer Bhim Bhurtel, Ross Bailey and Anthony Brown.

== Death ==
Sinclair was admitted to hospital in March 2020 after contracting COVID-19; he died on 31 March 2020 aged 73.
