= Charles R. Hamm =

United States Air Force general (1933–2026)

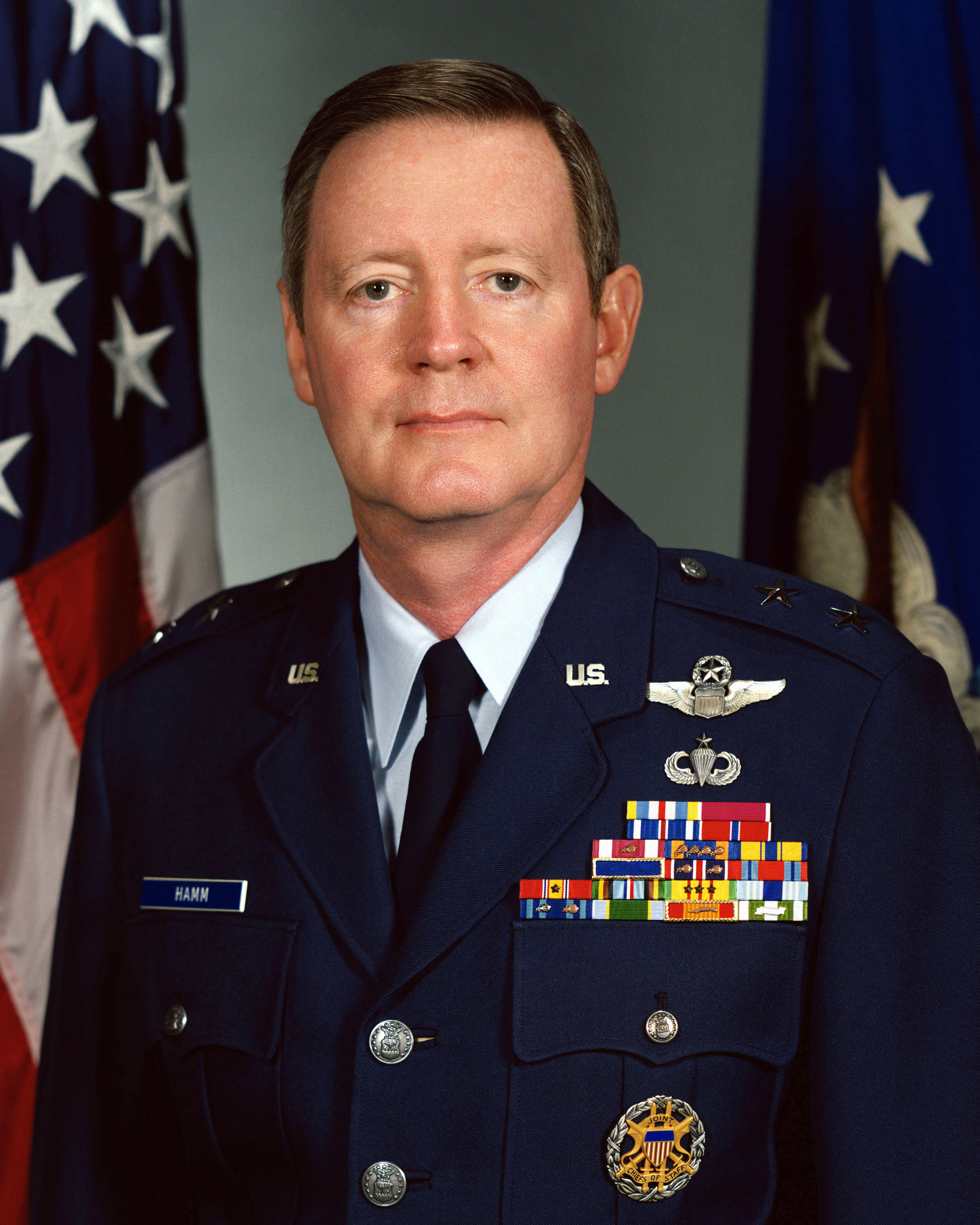
- Born: December 23, 1933; Little Rock, Arkansas, U.S.
- Died: July 23, 2026 (aged 92)
- Military career
- Allegiance: United States
- Branch: United States Air Force
- Service years: 1956–1991
- Rank: Lieutenant General
- Commands: United States Air Force Academy
- Conflicts: Vietnam War
- Awards: Air Force Distinguished Service Medal; Defense Superior Service Medal; Legion of Merit; Distinguished Flying Cross; Bronze Star Medal

Lieutenant General Charles R. Hamm (December 23, 1933 – July 23, 2026) was a United States Air Force lieutenant general who served as the eleventh Superintendent of the United States Air Force Academy in Colorado Springs.

== Early life and education ==
Hamm was born in Little Rock, Arkansas on December 23, 1933. He graduated from Kemper Military School, Boonville, Missouri, in 1951. He earned a bachelor's degree from the United States Military Academy in 1956 and a master's degree in political science from Auburn University in 1969. The general completed Air Command and Staff College in 1969, and the National War College in 1972.

== Military assignments ==
After completing pilot training at Malden Air Base, Missouri, and Laredo Air Force Base, Texas, in August 1957, Hamm attended F-86 Sabre gunnery school at Williams Air Force Base, Arizona. In February 1958 he transferred to Nellis Air Force Base, for gunnery training in F-100 Super Sabre fighter aircraft. He served tours at Toul-Rosières Air Base, France, and Hahn Air Base, West Germany, where he also flew the F-100. He later served with the 101st Airborne Division at Fort Campbell as a forward air controller.

From 1964 to 1966, Hamm was a member of the USAF Air Demonstration Squadron, the Thunderbirds, at Nellis Air Force Base. He served several tours of duty during the Vietnam War, and as a flight commander in the 416th Tactical Fighter Squadron, Bien Hoa Air Base, Republic of Vietnam, he flew 103 combat missions.

Hamm's command assignments have included commander, 8th Tactical Fighter Wing (Wolf Pack), Kunsan Air Base, South Korea and commander, 33rd Tactical Fighter Wing, Eglin Air Force Base, Florida. He served staff tours at Tactical Air Command, Headquarters, United States Air Force, and served as defense attache to the Union of Soviet Socialist Republics from 1981 to 1983. He assumed the position of Superintendent at the academy in June 1987. Hamm retired on July 1, 1991.

== Death ==
Hamm died on July 23, 2026, at the age of 92.

== Awards and decorations ==
Hamm's military awards and decorations include the Air Force Distinguished Service Medal, Defense Superior Service Medal, Legion of Merit, Distinguished Flying Cross, Bronze Star Medal, Meritorious Service Medal with oak leaf cluster, Air Medal with four oak leaf clusters, Air Force Commendation Medal and Combat Readiness Medal. Hamm was a command pilot with more than 4,000 flying hours.

Arkansas Aviation Historical Society inducted Hamm into the Arkansas Aviation Hall of Fame in 2000.

Military offices
Preceded by Winfield W. Scott Jr.	Superintendent of the U.S. Air Force Academy; 1987–1991	Succeeded by Bradley C. Hosmer
