= Michelle D. Johnson =

US Air Force general

Michelle Johnson
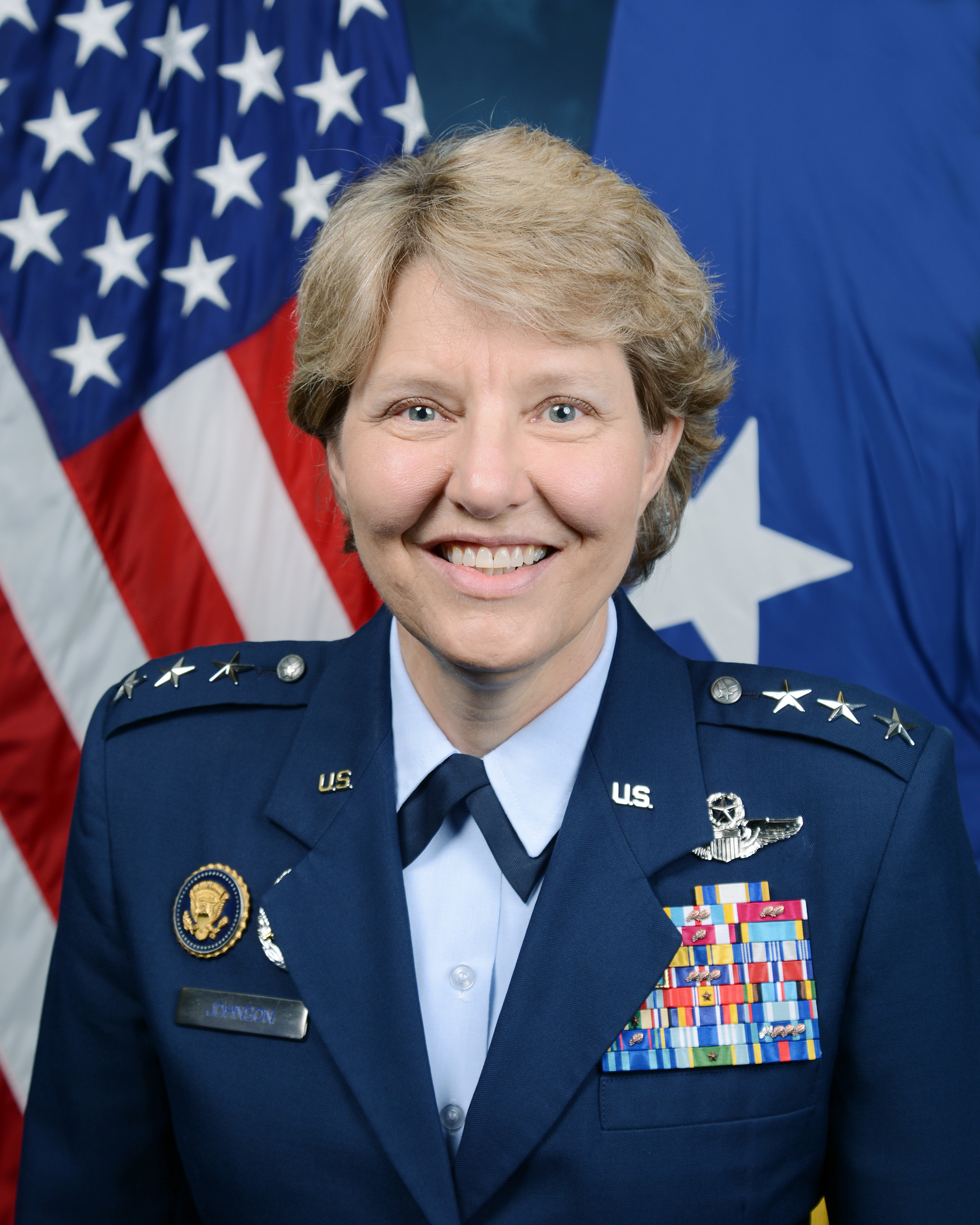
- Johnson in 2016

19th Superintendent of the United States Air Force Academy
- In office August 12, 2013 – August 11, 2017
- President: Barack Obama; Donald Trump
- Preceded by: Michael C. Gould
- Succeeded by: Jay B. Silveria

Personal details
- Born: c. 1959 (age 66–67)
- Military career
- Allegiance: United States
- Branch: United States Air Force
- Service years: 1981–2017
- Rank: Lieutenant General
- Commands: Superintendent, USAF Academy
- Awards: Defense Superior Service Medal; Legion of Merit; Meritorious Service Medal; Aerial Achievement Medal; Air Force Commendation Medal; Air Force Achievement Medal
- Alma mater: United States Air Force Academy (BS); Brasenose College, Oxford (MA)

Michelle D. Johnson (born c. 1959) is a retired lieutenant general in the United States Air Force and former senior vice president and head of referee operations for the National Basketball Association.

Johnson was the 19th superintendent of the U.S. Air Force Academy, the first woman to lead a U.S. Department of Defense service academy. Her previous position was the Deputy Chief of Staff, Operations and Intelligence, Supreme Headquarters Allied Powers Europe in Casteau, Belgium. She was formerly the Director, Strategy, Policy, Programs and Logistics, U.S. Transportation Command at Scott Air Force Base. Johnson also served as the deputy director for information and cyberspace policy, Strategic Plans and Policy Directorate at the Pentagon.

As an Air Force Academy cadet, Johnson was the first woman to serve as cadet wing commander (senior ranking cadet), and starred on the women's basketball team, scoring over 1,700 points. She was twice named an Academic All-American and was inducted into the Academic All-American Hall of Fame in 2007, making her the first woman from the Academy and one of only six graduates with that distinction. Also, she was selected as the Academy's first woman Rhodes Scholar in her First Class (senior) Year, and graduated with a bachelor's degree in operations research in 1981.

A transport and tanker pilot, Johnson was recognized as an Honorary Fellow of Brasenose College at Oxford in 2013, and received the 2014 American Legion Auxiliary Woman of the Year Award. Johnson was awarded a star (#42) on The Flag for Hope on June 18, 2016 in recognition of her outstanding military service.

== Education and training ==
- 1977 Spencer, Iowa High School
- 1981 Distinguished graduate, Bachelor of Science degree in operations research, U.S. Air Force Academy, Colorado Springs, Colorado.
- 1983 Rhodes Scholar, Master of Arts degree in politics and economics, Brasenose College, Oxford, England. At Brasenose College, Johnson studied with Vernon Bogdanor and Peter Sinclair who also taught David Cameron, the former British Prime Minister
- 1987 Squadron Officer School, Maxwell Air Force Base, Alabama.
- 1991 Air Command and Staff College, by correspondence
- 1996 Air War College, by correspondence
- 1999 Master of Science degree in national security strategy, National War College, Fort Lesley J. McNair, Washington, D.C.
- 2002 National Security Management Fellow, Syracuse University, New York
- 2005 Senior Executive Fellows Program, Harvard University, Cambridge, Massachusetts
- 2007 Fellow, Seminar XXI — Foreign Politics, International Relations and the National Interest, Massachusetts Institute of Technology, Cambridge, Massachusetts
- 2011 Joint Flag Officer Warfighting Course, Maxwell AFB, Ala.
- 2013 The Harvard Seminar for New Presidents, Harvard Graduate School of Education, Cambridge, Mass.

== Military career ==
Johnson attended pilot training at Williams Air Force Base in Arizona from May 1983 to July 1984, and completed her three-month C-141 qualification training at Altus AFB, Oklahoma, in October of that year.

Her command assignments included the 9th Air Refueling Squadron, the 97th Operations Group and the 22d Air Refueling Wing. She commanded a deployed air refueling squadron in Operation Southern Watch and an air refueling wing in support of Operations Noble Eagle, Enduring Freedom and Iraqi Freedom. She has served as the Air Force aide to the President, and as an Assistant Professor of Political Science, instructor pilot, and Associate Air Officer Commanding at the U.S. Air Force Academy.

On August 12, 2013, Johnson assumed command as Superintendent of the U.S. Air Force Academy, the first woman to hold the position. After 36 years of active duty, she retired from the Air Force in October 2017.

A command pilot, Johnson has more than 3,600 flying hours in C-141, T-41, KC-10, C-17, C-5, KC-135, T-37, and T-38 aircraft.

== NBA ==
Following her retirement from the Air Force in 2017, Johnson was appointed as senior vice president and head of referee operations for the National Basketball Association (NBA) on October 12. She assumed her new position on October 16 and stepped down two years later. Her duties included overseeing the recruitment, training, development, and evaluation of NBA referees, as well as the NBA replay center.

== Promotion history ==
Insignia	Rank	Date
	Lieutenant general	Aug. 12, 2013
	Major general	Aug. 2, 2010
	Brigadier general	Jan. 2, 2007
	Colonel	May 1, 1999
	Lieutenant colonel	Feb. 1, 1995
	Major	Oct. 1, 1991
	Captain	May 27, 1985
	First lieutenant	May 27, 1983
	Second lieutenant	May 27, 1981
