= Superintendent of the United States Air Force Academy =

Senior officer of USAF Academy in Colorado

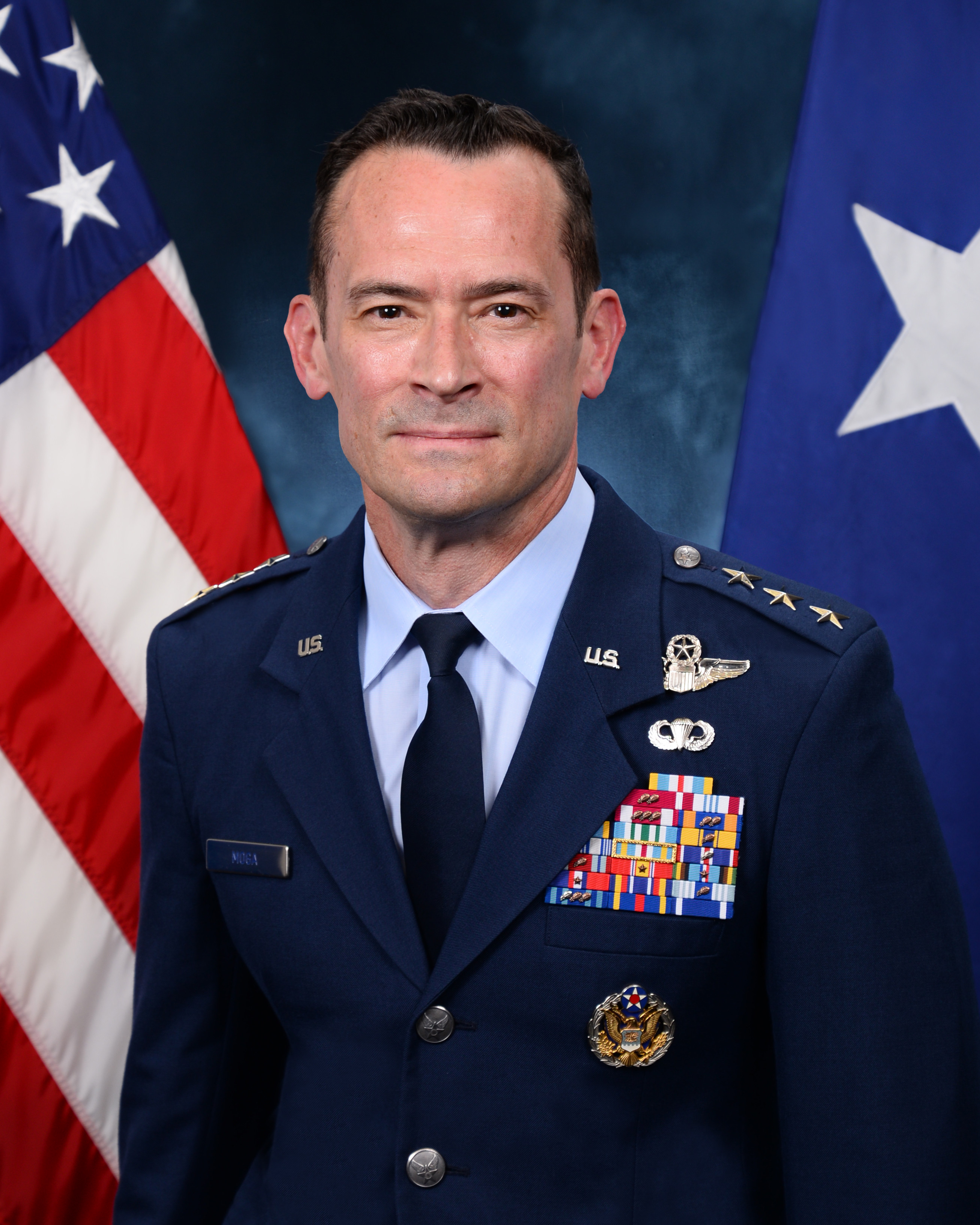
- Incumbent; Lieutenant General Paul Moga since 7 August 2026
- United States Air Force
- Reports to: Chief of Staff of the Air Force
- Appointer: The president; with Senate advice and consent
- First holder: Hubert R. Harmon
- Deputy: Vice Commander

The superintendent of the United States Air Force Academy is the senior officer and commander of the United States Air Force Academy in Colorado Springs, Colorado. The position is normally held by an active duty Air Force lieutenant general, and is roughly equivalent to the president of a university. Because the academy is a Direct Reporting Unit, the superintendent reports directly to the Air Force chief of staff. The superintendent oversees all aspects of the academy, including military training, academics, athletics, admissions and the base infrastructure.

The position of superintendent is established by statute, under 10 U.S.C. § 9333 and 10 U.S.C. § 9333a. Under those sections of law, the superintendent is appointed by the president of the United States, must serve as superintendent at least three years, and must retire at the end of his tour as superintendent, unless the retirement is waived by the secretary of defense under 10 U.S.C. § 9321. The practice of mandatory retirement has changed over time, however, as many early superintendents went on to higher positions in the Air Force after their terms at the academy.

Although it is not an official requirement for the position, nearly all superintendents have received their commissions from the academy (or from the USMA, if they graduated prior to the establishment of the USAFA).

== List of superintendents of the United States Air Force Academy ==
No.	Superintendent		Term			Class Year	Notes and Reference
No.	Portrait	Name	Took office	Left office	Term length	Class Year	Notes and Reference
1	Hubert R. Harmon	Lieutenant General; Hubert R. Harmon (1892–1957)	27 July 1954	28 July 1956	2 years, 1 day	USMA 1915	(Note: Lieutenant general; pursuit/fighter and bomber pilot; World War II veteran; commander of allied air units in the Solomon Islands campaign (March–June 1944); first academy superintendent, served while the Academy was temporarily based at Lowry Air Force Base, Colorado; main administration building at the Academy, Harmon Hall, is named in his honor)
2	James E. Briggs	Major General; James E. Briggs (1906–1979)	28 July 1956	17 August 1959	5 years, 20 days	USMA 1928	(Note: Lieutenant general; pursuit/fighter pilot; World War II veteran; oversaw the Academy's move to its permanent location in Colorado Springs; later commanded Air Training Command (1959-1963))
3	William S. Stone	Major General; William S. Stone (1910–1968)	17 August 1959	9 July 1962	2 years, 326 days	USMA 1934	(Note: General; bomber pilot; World War II veteran; associate professor of social sciences at West Point (1946-1950); later air deputy to the Supreme Allied Commander Europe (1966-1968))
4	Robert H. Warren	Major General; Robert H. Warren (1917–2010)	9 July 1962	1 July 1965	3 years, 54 days	USMA 1940	(Note: Lieutenant general; bomber pilot; World War II and Korean War veteran; later served as deputy assistant secretary of defense (international security affairs) for military assistance and sales (1969-1971))
5	Thomas S. Moorman	Lieutenant General; Thomas S. Moorman (1910–1997)	1 July 1965	1 August 1970	4 years, 334 days	USMA 1933	(Note: Lieutenant general; observation and reconnaissance pilot; World War II veteran; 16 years of weather operations culminating as Air Weather Service commander; vice commander in chief of Pacific Air Forces (1961-1965))
6	Albert P. Clark	Lieutenant General; Albert P. Clark (1913–2010)	1 August 1970	1 August 1974	4 years, 0 days	USMA 1936	(Note: Lieutenant general; fighter pilot, World War II veteran; prisoner of war in Stalag Luft III (1942-1945); commander of Air University (1968-1970))
7	James R. Allen	Lieutenant General; James R. Allen (1925–1992)	1 August 1974	28 June 1977	2 years, 331 days	USMA 1948	(Note: General; Korean War and Vietnam War veteran; key planner in the Son Tay Raid; later chief of staff, Supreme Headquarters Allied Powers Europe (1977-1979), deputy commander United States European Command (1979-1981), and commander of Military Airlift Command (1981-1983))
8	Kenneth L. Tallman	Lieutenant General; Kenneth L. Tallman (1925–2006)	28 June 1977	16 June 1981	3 years, 353 days	USMA 1946	(Note: Lieutenant general; fighter pilot; Vietnam War veteran; later served as President of Embry-Riddle Aeronautical University (1986-1991)Lieutenant general; fighter pilot; Vietnam War veteran; later served as President of Embry-Riddle Aeronautical University (1986-1991))
9	Robert E. Kelley	Major General; Robert E. Kelley (1933–2021)	16 June 1981	16 June 1983	2 years, 0 days	RU AFROTC 1956	(Note: Lieutenant general; fighter pilot; Vietnam War veteran; later Vice Commander of Tactical Air Command))
10	Winfield W. Scott Jr.	Lieutenant General; Winfield W. Scott Jr. (1927–2022)	16 June 1983	26 June 1987	4 years, 10 days	USMA 1950	(Note: Lieutenant general; fighter pilot; Korean War and Vietnam War veteran; also served as commander, Alaskan Air Command (1978-1981), and deputy commander, United States Forces Korea (1981-1983); completed the Academy's freefall parachute training while superintendent—the oldest and highest-ranking person to earn jump wings through that program)
11	Charles R. Hamm	Lieutenant General; Charles R. Hamm (1933–2026)	26 June 1987	25 June 1991	3 years, 364 days	USMA 1956	(Note: Lieutenant general; fighter pilot; Vietnam War veteran; Pilot with the Thunderbirds (1964-1966))
12	Bradley C. Hosmer	Lieutenant General; Bradley C. Hosmer (born 1937)	25 June 1991	8 July 1994	3 years, 13 days	USAFA 1959	(Note: Lieutenant general; fighter pilot; first graduate in the order of merit in the first class at the Academy; Academy's first Rhodes Scholar; first Academy graduate to return as superintendent; president of National Defense University (1986-1989))
13	Paul E. Stein	Lieutenant General; Paul E. Stein (1944–2002)	8 July 1994	1 August 1997	3 years, 24 days	USAFA 1966	(Note: Lieutenant general; former assistant coach for Air Force Falcons football; held a variety of staff positions; former commander of the Keesler Technical Training Center, Keesler Air Force Base, Mississippi (1991-1992))
14	Tad J. Oelstrom	Lieutenant General; Tad J. Oelstrom (born 1943)	1 August 1997	9 June 2000	2 years, 313 days	USAFA 1965	(Note: Lieutenant general; fighter pilot; Vietnam War and Gulf War veteran; Director of the National Security Program, John F. Kennedy School of Government, Harvard University (2001-present))
15	John R. Dallager	Lieutenant General; John R. Dallager (born 1947)	9 June 2000	10 April 2003	2 years, 305 days	USAFA 1965	(Note: Lieutenant general; fighter pilot; Vietnam War veteran; resigned as superintendent in the wake of the 2003 sexual assault scandal; demoted to major general upon his retirement)
-	John A. Weida	Brigadier General; John A. Weida; Acting	10 April 2003	9 July 2003	90 days	USAFA 1978	-
16	John W. Rosa Jr.	Lieutenant General; John W. Rosa Jr. (born 1951)	9 July 2003	24 October 2005	2 years, 107 days	Citadel AFROTC 1973	(Note: Lieutenant general; fighter pilot; later served as president of The Citadel, (2005-present))
17	John F. Regni	Lieutenant General; John F. Regni (born 1952)	24 October 2005	9 June 2009	3 years, 228 days	USAFA 1973	(Note: Lieutenant general; personnel officer; commander of Air University (2004-2005))
18	Michael C. Gould	Lieutenant General; Michael C. Gould (born 1953)	9 June 2009	12 August 2013	4 years, 64 days	USAFA 1976	(Note: Lieutenant general; transport and tanker pilot; commander of Cheyenne Mountain Operations Center (2000-2002); director of mobility forces for Operation Joint Endeavor and as U.S. European Command's Air Expeditionary Task Force commander for the deployment of African Union troops into the Darfur region of Sudan)
19	Michelle D. Johnson	Lieutenant General; Michelle D. Johnson	12 August 2013	11 August 2017	3 years, 364 days	USAFA 1981	(Note: Lieutenant general; first female superintendent of a United States service academy, following Rear Admiral Sandra L. Stosz of the United States Coast Guard Academy; transport and tanker pilot; director of strategy, policy, programs and logistics, U.S. Transportation Command (2009-2011); deputy chief of staff, operations and intelligence, Supreme Headquarters Allied Powers Europe (2011-2013); Rhodes Scholar, Class of 1983; has also served as a USAFA assistant professor of political science, USAF aide to the president, and commander of the 97th Operations Group at Altus AFB, Oklahoma.)
20	Jay B. Silveria	Lieutenant General; Jay B. Silveria	11 August 2017	23 September 2020	3 years, 43 days	USAFA 1985	(Note: Lieutenant General; fighter pilot; Deputy Commander, U.S. Air Forces Central Command; Commander, U.S. Air Force Warfare Center; Vice Commander, 14th Air Force; aide-de-camp to Supreme Allied Commander Europe.)
21	Richard M. Clark	Lieutenant General; Richard M. Clark (born 1964)	23 September 2020	1 June 2024	3 years, 252 days	USAFA 1986	
-	Thomas P. Sherman	Major General; Thomas P. Sherman; Acting	1 June 2024	2 August 2024	62 days	USAFA 1995	
22	Tony D. Bauernfeind	Lieutenant General; Tony D. Bauernfeind (born 1969)	2 August 2024	7 August 2026	2 years, 5 days	USAFA 1991	
23	Paul Moga	Lieutenant General; Paul Moga (born 1972)	7 August 2026	Incumbent	71 days	USAFA 1995	

== List of vice superintendent of the United States Air Force Academy ==
- Col Douglas K. Lamberth, July 2014 – December 2016
- Col David A. Harris Jr., July 2016
- Col Houston R. Cantwell, July 2018
- Col Otis C. Jones, July 2020
- Col Benjamin R. Jonsson, August 2022
- Maj Gen Thomas P. Sherman, May 2024

== See also ==
- Superintendent of the United States Military Academy
- Superintendent of the United States Naval Academy
