= John W. Rosa =

United States general (born 1951)

John W. Rosa Jr.
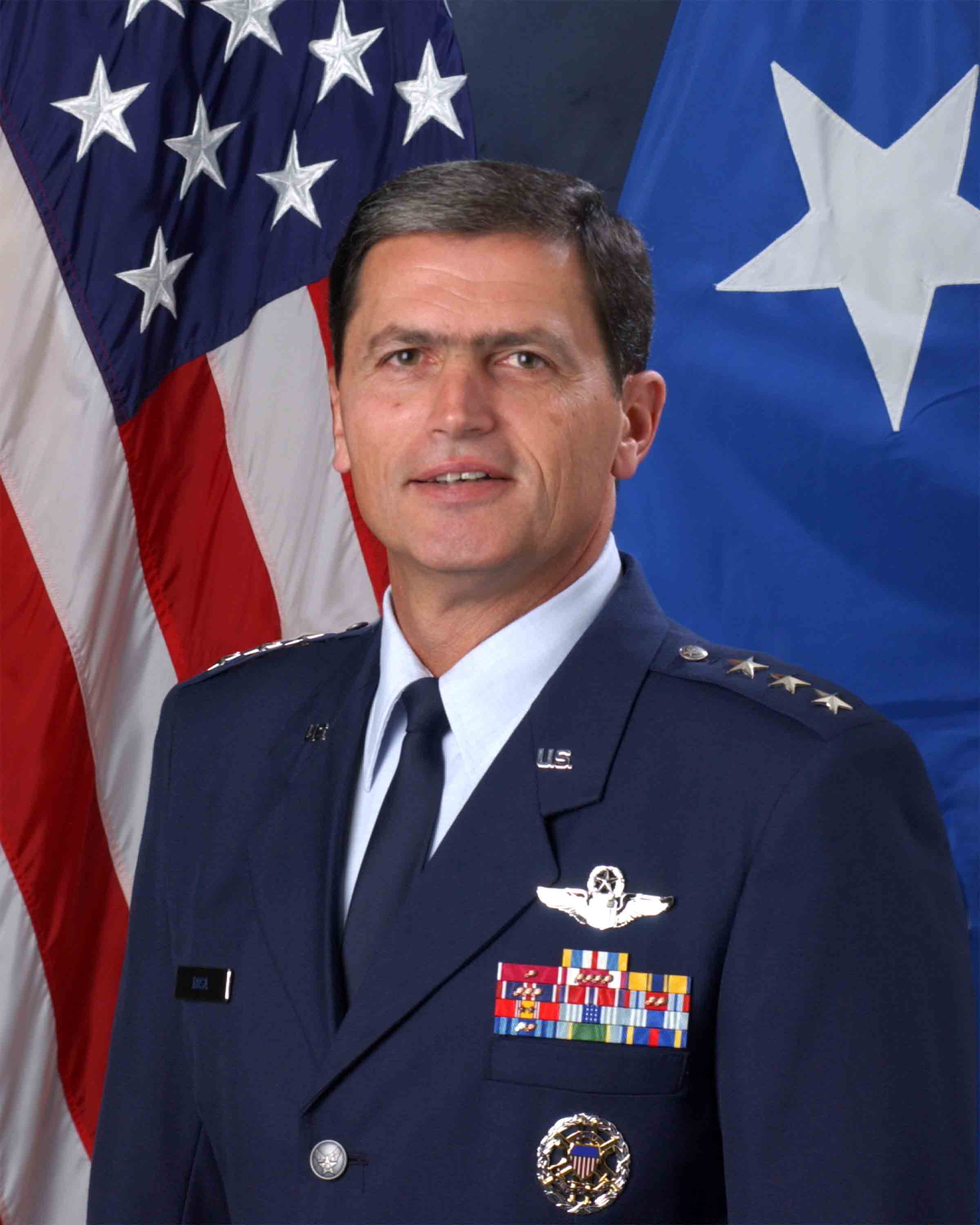
- John W. Rosa Jr.
- Born: John William Rosa Jr. September 28, 1951 (age 75); Springfield, Illinois, U.S.
- Military career
- Allegiance: United States of America
- Branch: United States Air Force
- Service years: 1973–2005
- Rank: Lieutenant General
- Commands: 35th Fighter Squadron; 366th Operations Support Squadron; 49th Operations Group; 20th Fighter Wing; 347th Wing; United States Air Force Academy
- Awards: Air Force Distinguished Service Medal; Defense Superior Service Medal; Legion of Merit
- Other work: President, The Citadel

John William Rosa Jr. (born September 28, 1951) is a retired United States Air Force Lieutenant General who served as President of his alma mater The Citadel in Charleston, South Carolina from 2006 to 2018. While on active duty, Rosa also served as the sixteenth Superintendent of the United States Air Force Academy.

== Background and education ==
Born in Springfield, Illinois and son of a career United States Navy Chief Petty Officer he attended high school in Jacksonville, Florida and was awarded a football scholarship to The Citadel in Charleston, South Carolina where he won the starting quarterback job his sophomore year until sidelined with a knee injury; he is an initiate of the Theta Commission of the Kappa Alpha Order. Rosa entered the Air Force in May 1973 after receiving his bachelor's degree and his commission (via Air Force ROTC); he earned a master's degree in public administration from Golden Gate University in 1985. Rosa is also a graduate of the Air Force Squadron Officer School, Air Command and Staff College, U.S. Army Command and General Staff College, U.S. Army War College and the Program for Senior Executives in National and International Security Management, John F. Kennedy School of Government, Harvard University.

== Military assignments ==
After his commissioning, Rosa went to pilot training at Craig Air Force Base, Alabama, followed by fighter training at Holloman Air Force Base, New Mexico. He flew the LTV A-7 Corsair II and Fairchild Republic A-10 Thunderbolt II with the 354th Tactical Fighter Wing at Myrtle Beach Air Force Base, South Carolina then the General Dynamics F-16 Fighting Falcon with the 56th Tactical Fighter Wing at MacDill Air Force Base, Florida; from 1980 to 1983, he served an exchange tour with the Royal Air Force as a pilot in Hunter and Jaguar aircraft at RAF Lossiemouth, Scotland.

His command positions have included the 35th Tactical Fighter Squadron, Kunsan Air Base, South Korea; the 366th Operations Support Squadron, Mountain Home Air Force Base, Idaho; 49th Operations Group at Holloman Air Force Base, New Mexico; 20th Fighter Wing, Shaw Air Force Base, South Carolina; and the 347th Rescue Wing, Moody Air Force Base, Georgia. He has also served on staff assignments at Pacific Air Forces, U.S. Air Force headquarters, and was Deputy Director for Operations on the Joint Staff. He also served as Commandant of the Air Command and Staff College and concluded his military career serving as the sixteenth Superintendent of the United States Air Force Academy before retiring from the Air Force in 2005.

Rosa is a Command Pilot with more than 3,600 flying hours in the A-7, A-10, the Hunter and Jaguar aircraft, F-16, F-117A, HH-60G and HC-130; he also attended the Instructor Course of the USAF Weapons School.

== Awards and decorations ==
US Air Force Command Pilot Badge
Office of the Joint Chiefs of Staff Identification Badge

Air Force Distinguished Service Medal
Defense Superior Service Medal
Legion of Merit with one bronze oak leaf cluster
Meritorious Service Medal with four oak leaf clusters
Air Force Commendation Medal
Air Force Outstanding Unit Award with two silver and one bronze oak leaf clusters
Air Force Organizational Excellence Award
Combat Readiness Medal with two oak leaf clusters
National Defense Service Medal with two bronze service stars
Air Force Overseas Short Tour Service Ribbon
Air Force Overseas Long Tour Service Ribbon
Air Force Longevity Service Award with one silver and two bronze oak leaf clusters
Small Arms Expert Marksmanship Ribbon
Air Force Training Ribbon

Preceded by Lieutenant General John R. Dallager	Superintendent of the U.S. Air Force Academy; 2003—2005	Succeeded by Lieutenant General John F. Regni

Preceded by Major General John S. Grinalds	President of The Citadel; 2006—2018	Succeeded by General Glenn M. Walters
