= John F. Regni =

United States Air Force general

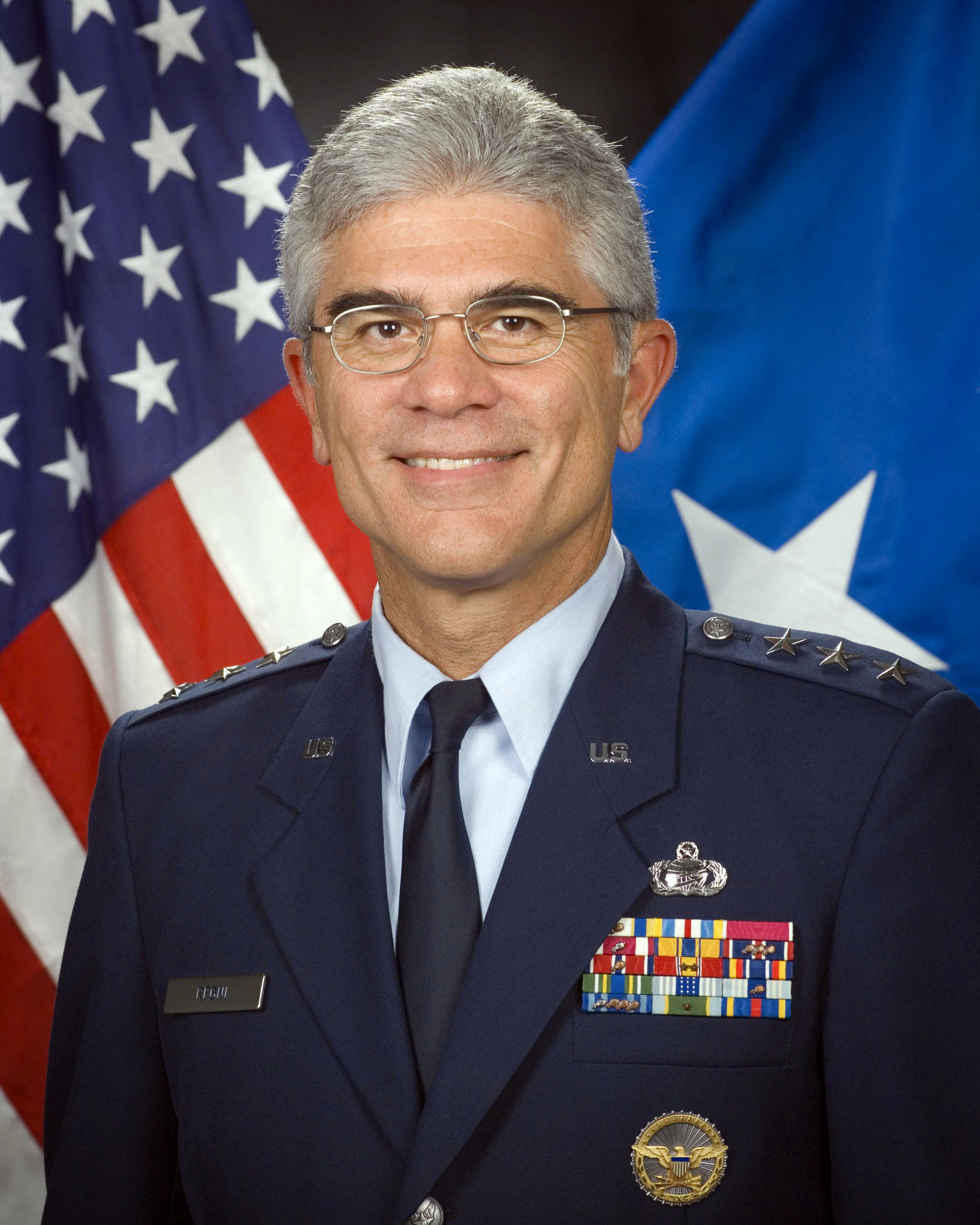
- Regni in 2008

17th Superintendent of the United States Air Force Academy
- In office October 24, 2005 – June 9, 2009
- President: George W Bush; Barack Obama
- Preceded by: John W. Rosa Jr.
- Succeeded by: Michael C. Gould

Personal details
- Born: January 19, 1952 (age 74) Wiesbaden Air Base, Germany
- Military career
- Alma mater: United States Air Force Academy (BS); St. Mary's University, Texas (MA)
- Allegiance: United States
- Branch: United States Air Force
- Service years: 1973–2009
- Rank: Lieutenant General
- Commands: United States Air Force Academy; Air University; Second Air Force; 8th Combat Support Group
- Awards: Air Force Distinguished Service Medal (3); Defense Superior Service Medal; Legion of Merit

John F. Regni (born January 19, 1952) is a retired United States Air Force lieutenant general who served as the 17th Superintendent of the United States Air Force Academy from 2005 to 2009.

== Education and training ==
Regni graduated from the United States Air Force Academy in 1973 with a Bachelor of Science in biology. He also holds a master's degree in systems management from St. Mary's University, Texas.

- 1973 Bachelor of Science degree in biology, United States Air Force Academy, Colorado Springs, Colo.
- 1977 Squadron Officer School, by correspondence
- 1981 Master of Science degree in systems management, St. Mary's University, San Antonio, Texas
- 1984 Air Command and Staff College, Maxwell AFB, Ala.
- 1990 Air War College, Maxwell AFB, Ala.
- 1993 Advanced Management Program, University of Illinois
- 1997 Capstone, National Defense University, Fort Lesley J. McNair, Washington, D.C.

He is a graduate of the Air Force Squadron Officer School, the Air Command and Staff College, and the Air War College.

== Military career ==
Regni's career encompassed a wide range of personnel, training and command assignments. His command tours included base commander and 8th Combat Support Group commander, Kunsan Air Base, South Korea; commander, Second Air Force; and commander, Air University, and the US Air Force Academy. His staff assignments included director of manpower, personnel and support for United States Pacific Command; director of personnel at Air Mobility Command; and director of military personnel policy, and then as director, personnel resources, both at Headquarters, United States Air Force. He was appointed superintendent in October 2005, only the second non-aeronautically rated officer to hold the position in the academy's history. Regni passed on the position of superintendent to Lieutenant General Michael C. Gould in June 2009, and retired from the Air Force on 1 July 2009.

== Assignments ==
- November 1973 – July 1976, personnel officer, Ogden Air Logistics Center, Hill AFB, Utah
- July 1976 – July 1978, chief, personnel utilization, 40th Tactical Group, Aviano Air Base, Italy
- July 1978 – July 1981, chief, force analysis, assistant for colonel assignments, Air Force Manpower and Personnel Center, Randolph AFB, Texas
- July 1981 – August 1983, assistant executive officer, deputy chief of staff for manpower and personnel, Headquarters U.S. Air Force, Washington, D.C.
- August 1983 – May 1984, student, Air Command and Staff College, Maxwell AFB, Alabama
- May 1984 – July 1987, assistant chief of staff, Headquarters Air Training Command, Randolph AFB, Texas
- July 1987 – August 1989, deputy base commander, 3380th Air Base Group, Keesler AFB, Mississippi
- August 1989 – July 1990, student, Air War College, Maxwell AFB, Alabama
- July 1990 – July 1991, base commander and commander, 8th Combat Support Group, Kunsan Air Base, South Korea
- July 1991 – August 1994, director, manpower, personnel and support, Headquarters U.S. Pacific Command, Camp H.M. Smith, Hawaii
- August 1994 – March 1996, director of personnel, Headquarters Air Mobility Command, Scott AFB, Illinois
- March 1996 – June 1998, director, military personnel policy, deputy chief of staff for personnel, Headquarters U.S. Air Force, Washington, D.C.
- July 1998 – August 2000, director of personnel resources, deputy chief of staff for personnel, Headquarters U.S. Air Force, and director, Air Force Personnel Operations Agency, Washington, D.C.
- August 2000 – July 2004, commander, 2nd Air Force, Keesler AFB, Mississippi
- July 2004 – October 2005, commander, Air University, Maxwell AFB, Alabama
- October 2005 – June 2009, superintendent, United States Air Force Academy, Colorado

== Awards and decorations ==
Regni's military decorations include the Air Force Distinguished Service Medal with two oak leaf clusters, the Defense Superior Service Medal, the Legion of Merit, the Meritorious Service Medal with silver oak leaf cluster, and the Air Force Commendation Medal.

Military offices
Preceded by John W. Rosa	17th Superintendent of the U.S. Air Force Academy; 2005–2009	Succeeded by Michael C. Gould
