= Michael C. Gould =

US Air Force general

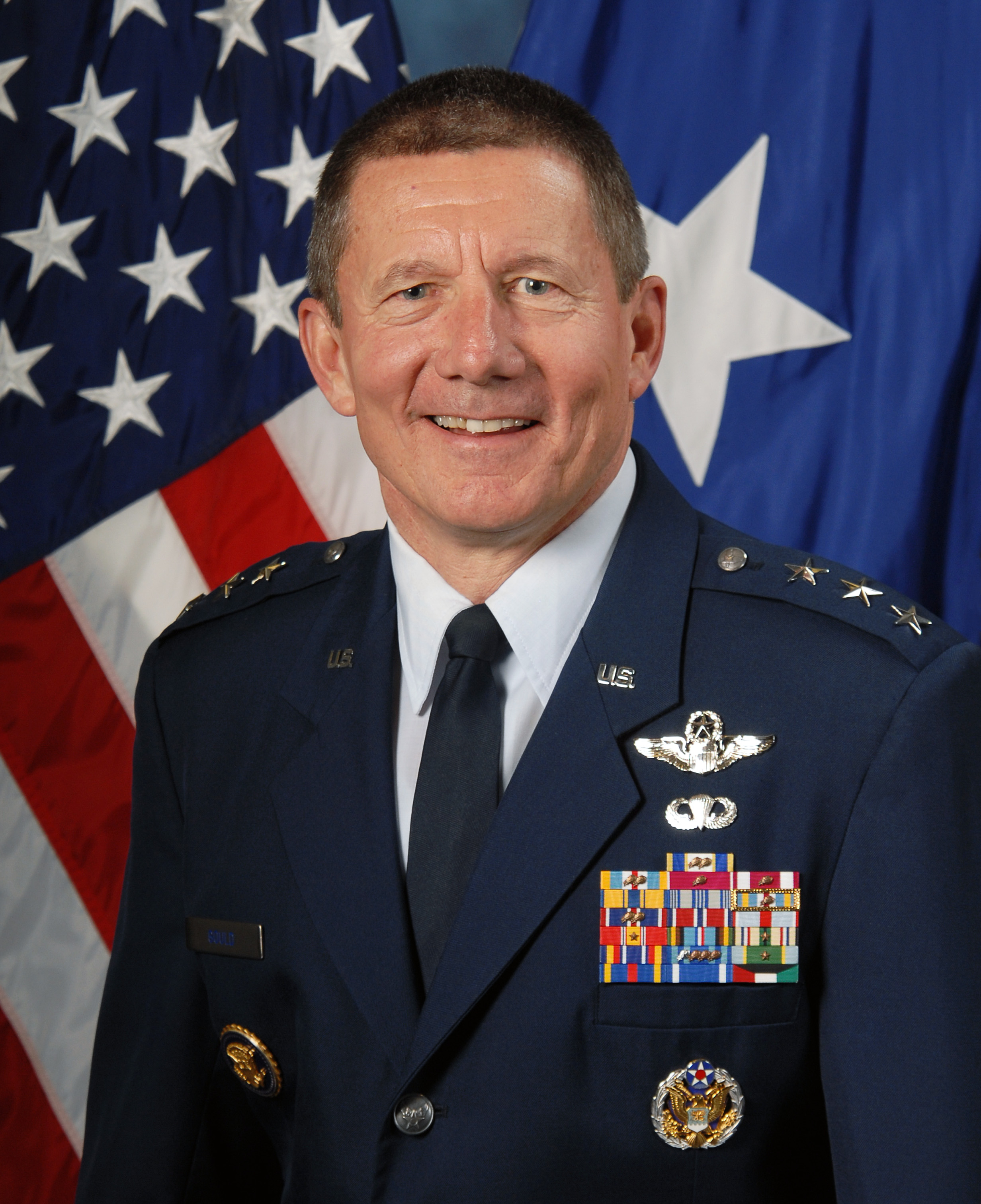
- Gould in 2012

18th Superintendent of the United States Air Force Academy
- In office June 9, 2009 – August 12, 2013
- President: Barack Obama
- Preceded by: John F. Regni
- Succeeded by: Michelle D. Johnson

Personal details
- Born: December 21, 1953 (age 72)
- Military career
- Education: United States Air Force Academy (BS); Webster University (MA)
- Allegiance: United States
- Branch: United States Air Force
- Service years: 1973–2013
- Rank: Lieutenant general
- Commands: United States Air Force Academy; Second Air Force; Third Air Force; Cheyenne Mountain Operations Center; 97th Air Mobility Wing; 22nd Air Refueling Wing; 305th Operations Group
- Conflicts: Gulf War
- Awards: Air Force Distinguished Service Medal (3); Defense Superior Service Medal (3); Legion of Merit (2)

Lieutenant General Michael Carl Gould (born December 21, 1953) is a retired senior officer of the United States Air Force who served as the 18th Superintendent of the United States Air Force Academy. He assumed command on June 9, 2009, and retired from service in July 2013. He previously served as director of operations and plans, United States Transportation Command, Scott Air Force Base. Gould is a command pilot with more than 3,000 hours in a variety of aircraft.

== Early life and education ==
Gould is a native of Kent, Ohio, and graduated from Kent State High School in 1971. He graduated from the United States Air Force Academy Preparatory School in 1972 and earned his commission from the United States Air Force Academy in 1976. Gould starred as a defensive back on the Air Force football team.

- 1971 Kent State High School
- 1976 Bachelor of Science degree in behavioral science, U.S. Air Force Academy, Colorado Springs, Colorado
- 1983 Squadron Officer School, Maxwell Air Force Base, Alabama
- 1986 Master of Arts degree in human resource development, Webster University
- 1989 Air Command and Staff College, Maxwell AFB, Alabama
- 1993 National War College, Fort Lesley J. McNair, Washington, D.C.
- 1998 Advanced Executive Program, Kellogg Graduate School of Management, Northwestern University, Evanston, Illinois
- 2001 National and International Security Management Course, John F. Kennedy School of Government, Harvard University, Cambridge, Mass.

== Military career ==
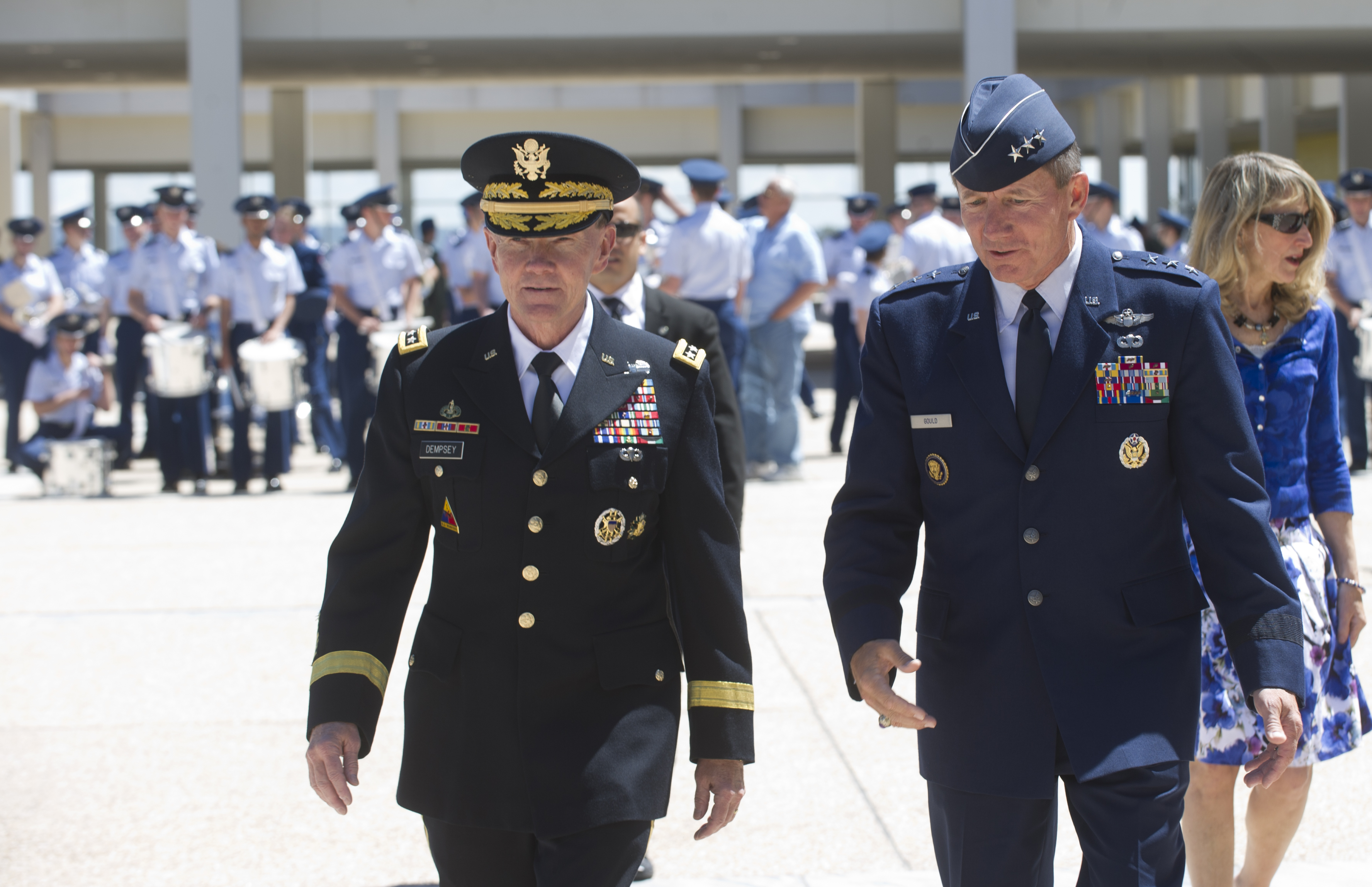
Gould hosts Chairman of the Joint Chiefs of Staff, General Martin E. Dempsey, at the Air Force Academy in April 2012.

Gould commanded an operations group, an air refueling wing, an air mobility wing and the Cheyenne Mountain Operations Center. He also commanded the Third Air Force, Royal Air Force Mildenhall, England, and the Second Air Force, Keesler AFB. His operational and staff assignments include three tours at Headquarters United States Air Force, along with duty as an Air Force aide to the President and military assistant to the Secretary of the Air Force. He served as the director of mobility forces for Operation Joint Endeavor and as United States European Command's Air Expeditionary Task Force commander for the deployment of African Union troops into the Darfur region of Sudan.

=== Assignments ===
- June 1976 – January 1977, graduate assistant football coach, U.S. Air Force Academy, Colorado Springs, Colorado
- January 1977 – December 1977, student, undergraduate pilot training, Vance AFB, Oklahoma
- December 1977 – August 1981, T-38 instructor pilot, flight scheduler, safety officer and runway supervisor unit controller, 97th Flying Training Squadron, Williams AFB, Arizona
- August 1981 – June 1985, physical education instructor; assistant men's golf coach; head prep-school football coach; and T-41 instructor pilot, U.S. Air Force Academy, Colorado Springs, Colorado
- June 1985 – July 1986, T-38 pilot training instructor, flight commander and standardization pilot, 12th Flying Training Wing, Randolph AFB, Texas
- July 1986 – August 1988, executive officer to the Vice Commander, Air Training Command, and standardization pilot, Headquarters ATC, Randolph AFB, Texas
- August 1988 – July 1989, student, Air Command and Staff College, Maxwell AFB, Alabama
- July 1989 – June 1990, chief of Officer Professional Military Education, Deputy Chief of Staff for Personnel Programs, Headquarters U.S. Air Force, Washington, D.C.
- June 1990 – July 1992, Air Force aide to the President, The White House, Washington, D.C.
- July 1992 – June 1993, student, National War College, Fort Lesley J. McNair, Washington, D.C.
- June 1993 – September 1994, KC-10 aircraft commander and assistant operations officer, 6th Air Refueling Squadron, and special assistant to the operations group commander, 722nd Operations Group, March AFB, California
- September 1994 – February 1995, deputy commander, 438th Operations Group, McGuire AFB, New Jersey
- February 1995 – June 1996, commander, 305th Operations Group, McGuire AFB, New Jersey
- July 1996 – December 1996, chief of Mobility Forces Division, Deputy Chief of Staff for Plans and Operations, Headquarters U.S. Air Force, Washington, D.C.
- December 1996 – April 1998, military assistant to the Secretary of the Air Force, the Pentagon, Washington, D.C.
- April 1998 – January 1999, commander of 22nd Air Refueling Wing, McConnell AFB, Kansas
- January 1999 – August 2000, commander of 97th Air Mobility Wing, Altus AFB, Oklahoma
- September 2000 – May 2002, commander of Cheyenne Mountain Operations Center, Cheyenne Mountain AFS, Colorado
- May 2002 – July 2004, director of operational plans and joint matters, Deputy Chief of Staff for Air and Space Operations, Headquarters U.S. Air Force, Washington, D.C.
- July 2004 – November 2005, deputy commander, 3rd Air Force, Royal Air Force Mildenhall, England
- November 2005 – May 2008, commander, 2nd Air Force, Keesler AFB, Mississippi
- June 2008 – May 2009, director of operations and plans, U.S. Transportation Command, Scott AFB, Illinois
- June 2009 – July 2013, superintendent of U.S. Air Force Academy, Colorado Springs, Colorado

=== Major awards and decorations ===
- Air Force Distinguished Service Medal with two oak leaf clusters
- Defense Superior Service Medal with two oak leaf clusters
- Legion of Merit with oak leaf cluster
- Meritorious Service Medal with oak leaf cluster
- Air Force Commendation Medal
- Air Force Achievement Medal
- Global War on Terrorism Service Medal

=== Dates of rank ===
- Second lieutenant, June 2, 1976
- First lieutenant, June 2, 1978
- Captain, June 2, 1980
- Major, August 1, 1987
- Lieutenant colonel, July 1, 1991
- Colonel, Feb. 1, 1995
- Brigadier general, Sept. 1, 2000
- Major general, Sept. 1, 2003
- Lieutenant General, June 9, 2009

== Controversies ==
In October 2013, three months after retiring from the Air Force, Gould was named to the first-ever College Football Playoff selection committee. His selection to the committee came under some scrutiny as he had been away from the game since the 1970s, when he played and later coached at Air Force.

After his committee appointment, a controversial program came to light in a Colorado Springs Gazette article. To help combat illicit drug use and sexual assaults by Air Force Academy students, the United States Air Force Office of Special Investigations (AFOSI) created in 2011 a system of student informants to hunt for misconduct among students. According to The New York Times in Academic Year 2014, "after the informant program ended with no further convictions, reports fell by half." The New York Times has cited a letter to Congress from former AFOSI Agent, Staff Sergeant Brandon Enos, who said that Gould had interfered in cases involving football players. In turn Gould said to The New York Times that the suggestion that he had interfered with the investigation "preposterous". Gould said that the allegations would not stop him from serving on the playoff selection committee. A special on ESPN E60 titled "Operation Gridiron" aired in 2014 showed an in-depth look at the scandal at the Air Force Academy regarding drugs and rape which took place under Gould's leadership. It uncovers how Gould not only attempted to cover up the scandal and protect high-profile football players at the Academy, but also set out to punish the students who provided intelligence on the scandal.

After Operation Grid Iron and the Office of Special Investigations scandal, Lt. Gen. Michael Gould was named in a lawsuit in DeRito v. United States Air Force Academy/United States of America in 2017. After reporting sexual assault and working as an undercover informant; DeRito alleged he was improperly discharged and his medical records were illegally falsified to delegitimize him. The case was dismissed.

Military offices
Preceded by John F. Regni	18th Superintendent of the United States Air Force Academy; 2009–2013	Succeeded by Michelle D. Johnson
