= John R. Dallager =

United States Air Force general

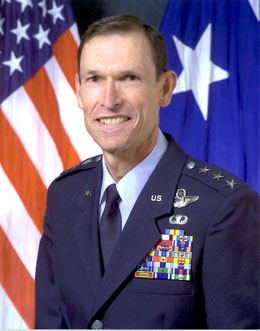
- John R. Dallager
- Born: March 4, 1947 (age 79)
- Military career
- Allegiance: United States of America
- Branch: United States Air Force
- Service years: 1969–2003
- Rank: Major general (demoted from lieutenant general)
- Commands: Superintendent, U.S. Air Force Academy
- Conflicts: Vietnam War
- Awards: Distinguished Flying Cross; Legion of Merit

John Rives Dallager (born March 4, 1947) is a retired United States Air Force major general. He served as the fifteenth Superintendent of the United States Air Force Academy from 2000 to 2003. He resigned the position in the wake of the sexual assault scandal at the academy and was demoted from the rank of lieutenant general to major general upon his retirement.

== Training and education ==
Dallager was a distinguished graduate of the United States Air Force Academy, where he earned a Bachelor of Science degree in mechanical engineering in 1969. He earned a Master of business degree from Troy State University in 1978, and is a graduate of the Air Force's Air Command and Staff College, the National Defense University, and the U.S. Army War College.

== Military career ==
After graduating from the academy, Dallager went to pilot training at Craig Air Force Base, Alabama, where he was a distinguished graduate. He went to advanced training in the F-4 Phantom II, and was assigned to Korat Royal Thai Air Force Base, Thailand from 1971 to 1972.

His command positions included commander of the 357th Tactical Fighter Training Squadron at Davis-Monthan Air Force Base, Arizona; commander of the 354th Tactical Fighter Wing, Myrtle Beach Air Force Base, South Carolina; commander of the 52nd Fighter Wing at Spangdahlem Air Base, Germany; and commander of 13th Air Force, Andersen Air Force Base, Guam. He has also held staff positions at United States Air Force Headquarters, United States Central Command, Supreme Headquarters Allied Powers Europe. Dallager has combat flying experience in Vietnam War, Southwest Asia and Bosnia.

Dallager was the commanding officer (wing commander) of the two F-15 Eagle pilots who, while deployed to operation Southern Watch in Iraq (1995), shot down two U.S. Army Blackhawk helicopters. Dallager refused to direct courts-martial for the two pilots though many feel they were guilty of 27 counts of negligent homicide.

Dallager is a pilot with more than 2,900 flying hours, including over 600 combat hours, in aircraft including the F-4, A-10 and F-15 Eagle.

=== Academy sexual assault scandal ===
The breaking of the sexual assault scandal at the Academy in 2003 brought a great deal of attention on the leadership of Dallager as superintendent. A Pentagon investigation laid heavy blame on the Academy's leadership, including Dallager, for the environment that led to the scandal. In the wake of the scandal, Air Force Secretary James Roche replaced all of the Academy's leadership in 2003, including Dallager, who was to be demoted as well.

Some saw the Dallager's demotion and removal as scapegoating: namely, that Roche was merely placating some senators' desire that someone be blamed. The timing of the order only added to this impression, as Roche announced the move only days after his own nomination to be Secretary of the Army went to the Senate Armed Services Committee. Dallager retired on September 1, 2003, at the lower rank of major general.

== Awards and decorations ==
Dallager's decorations include the Defense Distinguished Service Medal, Air Force Distinguished Service Medal, Defense Superior Service Medal with two oak leaf clusters; the Legion of Merit with oak leaf cluster; the Distinguished Flying Cross with two oak leaf clusters; the Meritorious Service Medal with three oak leaf clusters; the Air Medal with three silver oak leaf clusters; the Air Force Commendation Medal; the Air Force Achievement Medal; the Joint Meritorious Unit Award; the Vietnam Service Medal with three bronze stars; the Republic of Vietnam Gallantry Cross with Palm; and the Republic of Vietnam Campaign Medal.

- Defense Distinguished Service Medal
- Air Force Distinguished Service Medal
- Defense Superior Service Medal with two oak leaf clusters
- Legion of Merit with oak leaf cluster
- Distinguished Flying Cross with two oak leaf clusters
- Meritorious Service Medal with three oak leaf clusters
- Air Medal with three silver oak leaf clusters
- Air Force Commendation Medal
- Air Force Achievement Medal
- Joint Meritorious Unit Award
- Vietnam Service Medal with three bronze stars
- Republic of Vietnam Gallantry Cross with Palm
- Republic of Vietnam Campaign Medal

Preceded by Tad J. Oelstrom	Superintendent of the U.S. Air Force Academy; 2000—2003	Succeeded by John W. Rosa
