= List of United States Air Force Academy alumni =

Coordinates: 39.0120°N 104.8894°W

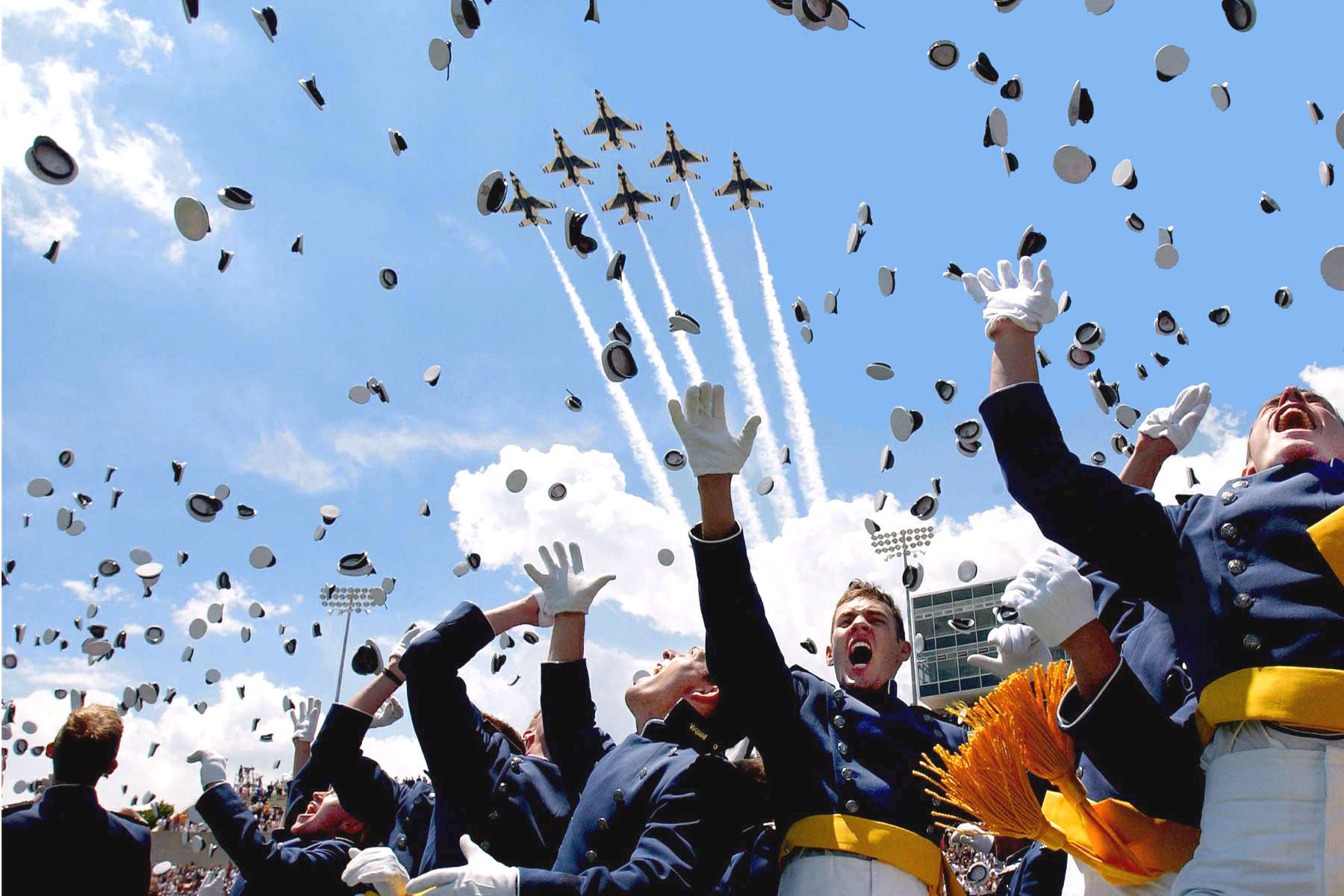
Traditional hat toss and flyover by Air Force Thunderbirds at the graduation ceremony at the United States Air Force Academy

Logo of the Air Force Academy

The United States Air Force Academy is an undergraduate college in Colorado Springs, Colorado, with the mission of educating and commissioning officers for the United States Air Force and United States Space Force. The Academy was established in 1954, entered its first class in 1955, and graduated its first class in 1959. All students hold the Air Force rank of "cadet." Sports media refer to the Academy as "Air Force"; this usage is officially endorsed. Most cadets are admitted through a congressional appointment system. The curriculum is broad-based but has traditionally emphasized science and engineering. Before the Academy's first graduating class in 1959, the United States Military Academy and United States Naval Academy were the primary sources of officers for the Air Force and its predecessors, the Army Air Corps and Army Air Forces. Though the primary focus of the Academy is for the Air Force and Space Force, some graduates are given the option of "cross-commissioning" into the United States Army, United States Navy, United States Marine Corps, or United States Coast Guard.

This list is drawn from graduates, non-graduate former cadets, current cadets, and faculty of the Air Force Academy. Over 410 noted scholars from a variety of academic fields are Academy graduates, including: 41 Rhodes Scholars, 24 Marshall Scholars, 13 Harry S. Truman Scholars, 115 John F. Kennedy School of Government Scholars, and 31 Gerahart Scholars. Additional notable graduates include 794 general officers, 164 graduates who were killed in combat, 36 repatriated prisoners of war, 1 Medal of Honor recipient, and 2 combat aces. 39 Academy graduates have become astronauts, second among institutions of higher learning only to the United States Naval Academy, with 52.

== Academics ==
"Class year" refers to the individual's class year, which usually is the same as the individual's graduation year. In times of war, academy classes may graduate early, but this has never happened yet at the Air Force Academy.

| Name | Class year | Notability | References |
|---|---|---|---|
| Bradley C. Hosmer | 1959 | Lieutenant general; first graduate in the order of merit in the first class at the Academy; Academy's first Rhodes Scholar; first graduate to return to the Academy as Superintendent of the Air Force Academy (1991–1994) | |
| Ruben A. Cubero | 1961 | Brigadier general; combat pilot veteran of the Vietnam War; first Hispanic dean of faculty at the Academy | |
| Ervin Rokke | 1962 | Lieutenant general; first USAFA graduate to be dean of faculty at the Academy, 1984–86; president of National Defense University 1994–97; president of Moravian College 1997–2006 | |
| Tad J. Oelstrom | 1965 | Director of the National Security Program, John F. Kennedy School of Government, Harvard University; superintendent of the U.S. Air Force Academy (1997–2000) | |
| Frank Klotz | 1973 | Lieutenant general; Rhodes scholar; commander, Air Force Global Strike Command; missilier | |
| Linda Garcia Cubero | 1980 | Member of the first class of women to graduate from the United States Air Force Academy, thus the first Hispanic woman to graduate from any service academy | |
| Michelle D. Johnson | 1981 | Lieutenant general; jet transport/tanker pilot; first female USAF Academy Rhodes Scholar; first female Cadet Wing commander; Academic All American Basketball player (1981–82); inaugural member, USAF Academy Sports Hall of Fame (2007); Air Force aide to the president of the United States (1992–94); superintendent of the Air Force Academy 2013–2017 | |
| Heather Wilson | 1982 | Rhodes Scholar; first graduate elected to the United States Congress; U.S. Representative from New Mexico's 1st congressional district (1998–2009); President of South Dakota School of Mines and Technology (2013–2017); first graduate appointed as Secretary of the Air Force (2017–2019) | |
| Dana H. Born | 1983 | Brigadier general; first female dean of faculty at the Academy | |
| Thomas W. Krise | 1983 | 13th president of Pacific Lutheran University 2012–2017 | |
| Christopher B. Howard | 1991 | Rhodes Scholar; president of Hampden-Sydney College, 2009–16; president of Robert Morris University, 2016- | |
| Linell Letendre | 1996 | Lawyer and dean of the faculty | |
| David Wagner | 2017 | Marshall Scholar (2017), combat veteran and recipient of 2 Distinguished Flying Crosses | |

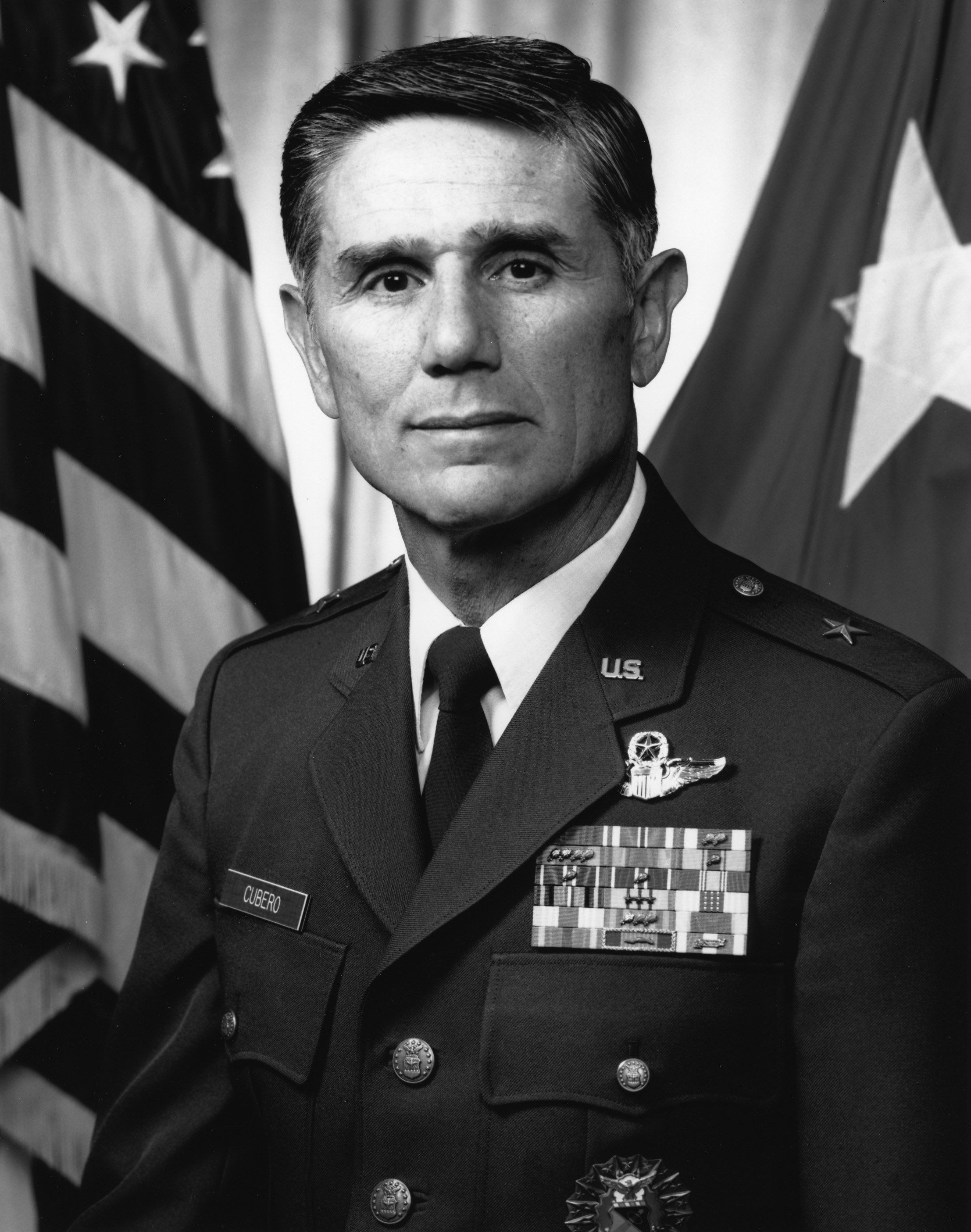
Ruben Cubero

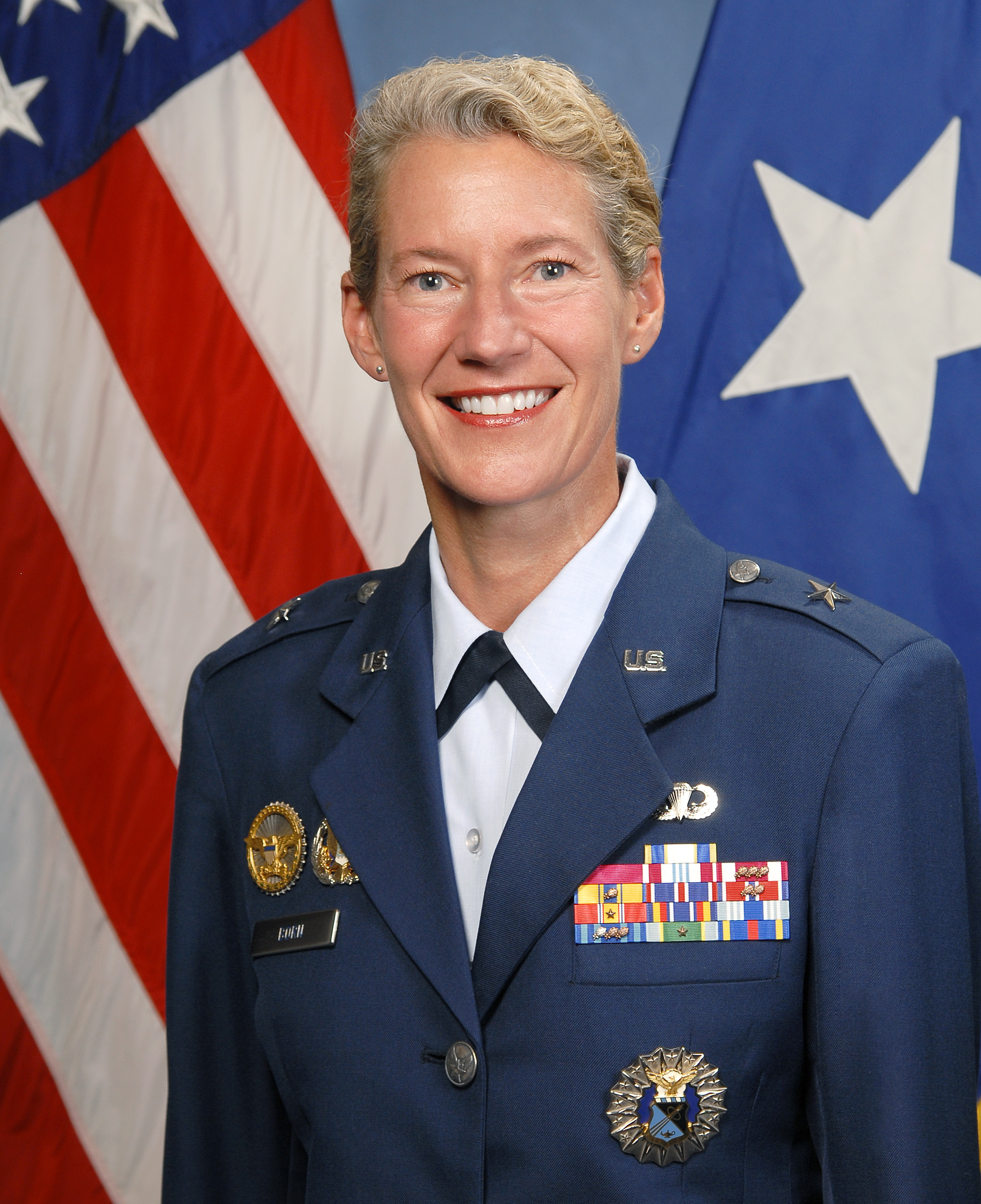
Dana Born

=== Superintendents of the Academy ===
| Name | Class year | Notability | References |
|---|---|---|---|
| Bradley C. Hosmer | 1959 | Lieutenant general; first graduate in the order of merit in the first class at the Academy; Academy's first Rhodes Scholar; first graduate to return to the Academy as superintendent of the Air Force Academy (1991–1994) | |
| Tad J. Oelstrom | 1965 | Director of the National Security Program, John F. Kennedy School of Government, Harvard University; superintendent of the U.S. Air Force Academy (1997–2000) | |
| Paul E. Stein | 1966 | Superintendent of the U.S. Air Force Academy (1994–1997) | |
| John R. Dallager | 1969 | Superintendent of the U.S. Air Force Academy (2000–2003) | |
| John F. Regni | 1973 | Superintendent of the U.S. Air Force Academy (2005–2009) | |
| Michael C. Gould | 1976 | Superintendent of the U.S. Air Force Academy (2009–2013); commander of Cheyenne Mountain Operations Center (2000–2002) | |
| Michelle D. Johnson | 1981 | Superintendent of the U.S. Air Force Academy (2013–2017) | |
| Jay B. Silveria | 1985 | Superintendent of the U.S. Air Force Academy (2017–2020) | |
| Richard M. Clark | 1986 | Superintendent of the U.S. Air Force Academy (2020–2024) | |
| Tony D. Bauernfeind | 1991 | Superintendent of the U.S. Air Force Academy (2024–present) | |

Current superintendent: Tony D. Bauernfeind

== Astronauts ==
| Name | Class year | Notability | References |
|---|---|---|---|
| Karol J. Bobko | 1959 | Pilot of STS-6; commanded STS-51-D and STS-51-J; only astronaut to have flown on the maiden flight of two Space Shuttle orbiters ( Challenger and Atlantis) | |
| Frederick D. Gregory | 1964 | Pilot of STS-51-B; commanded STS-33 and STS-44; former deputy administrator and former acting administrator for NASA; first African American to command any space vehicle | |
| John E. Blaha | 1965 | Pilot of STS-29 and STS-33; commanded STS-43 and STS-58, also flew a long-duration spaceflight on the Mir space station | |
| Roy D. Bridges, Jr. | 1965 | Major general; pilot of STS-51-F; director of the Kennedy Space Center (1997–2003) and Director of Langley Research Center (2003–2005) | |
| John Casper | 1966 | Pilot of STS-36; commanded STS-54, STS-62 and STS-77 | |
| Ronald J. Grabe | 1966 | Pilot of STS-51-J and STS-30; commanded STS-42 and STS-57 | |
| Charles L. Veach | 1966 | Mission specialist on STS-39 and STS-52 | |
| Loren Shriver | 1967 | Pilot of STS-51-C; commanded STS-31 and STS-46 | |
| Richard O. Covey | 1968 | Pilot of STS-51-I and STS-26; commanded STS-38 and STS-61 | |
| Guy Gardner | 1969 | STS-27, STS-35 | |
| Gary Payton | 1971 | Payload specialist on STS-51-C | |
| Sidney M. Gutierrez | 1973 | Pilot of STS-40 and commanded STS-59 | |
| L. Blaine Hammond | 1973 | Pilot of STS-39 and STS-64 | |
| Terence T. Henricks | 1974 | Pilot of STS-44 and STS-55; commanded STS-70 and STS-78 | |
| Mark C. Lee | 1974 | Mission specialist on STS-30, STS-64 and STS-82; payload commander of STS-47 | |
| Donald R. McMonagle | 1974 | Mission specialist on STS-39, pilot of STS-54 and commanded STS-66 | |
| William A. Pailes | 1974 | Payload specialist on STS-51-J | |
| Ronald M. Sega | 1974 | Major general; mission specialist on STS-60 and STS-76; former undersecretary of the United States Air Force | |
| Brian Duffy | 1975 | Pilot of STS-45 and STS-57; commanded STS-72 and STS-92 | |
| Kevin P. Chilton | 1976 | General; only astronaut to reach 4-star rank; pilot of STS-49 and STS-59; commanded STS-76; former commander of United States Strategic Command | |
| Thomas D. Jones | 1977 | Mission specialist on STS-59, STS-80 and STS-98; payload commander on STS-68 | |
| Charles J. Precourt | 1977 | Mission specialist on STS-55; pilot of STS-71; commanded STS-84 and STS-91 | |
| Curtis Brown | 1978 | Pilot of STS-47, STS-66 and STS-77; commanded STS-85, STS-95 and STS-103 | |
| James D. Halsell | 1978 | Pilot of STS-65 and STS-74; commanded STS-83, STS-94 and STS-101 | |
| Kevin R. Kregel | 1978 | Pilot of STS-70 and STS-78; commanded STS-87 and STS-99 | |
| Richard A. Searfoss | 1978 | Pilot of STS-58 and STS-76; commanded STS-90 | |
| William G. Gregory | 1979 | Pilot of STS-67 | |
| Susan J. Helms | 1980 | Lieutenant general; mission specialist on STS-54, STS-64, STS-78 and STS-101; flight engineer of International Space Station Expedition 2; member of the first class of women to graduate from the United States Air Force Academy | |
| Michael J. Bloomfield | 1981 | Pilot of STS-86 and STS-97; commanded STS-110 | |
| Steven W. Lindsey | 1982 | Pilot of STS-87 and STS-95; commanded STS-104, STS-121 and STS-133 | |
| B. Alvin Drew | 1984 | Mission specialist on STS-118 and STS-133 | |
| Gregory H. Johnson | 1984 | Pilot of STS-123, pilot of STS-134 | |
| James M. Kelly | 1986 | Pilot of STS-102 and STS-114 | |
| Eric A. Boe | 1987 | Pilot of STS-126 and STS-133 | |
| Terry W. Virts | 1989 | Pilot of STS-130 | |
| James Dutton | 1991 | Pilot of STS-131 | |
| Kjell Lindgren | 1995 | Expedition 44, Expedition 45 | |
| Jack Fischer | 1996 | Expedition 51, Expedition 52 | |
| Nick Hague | 1998 | Soyuz MS-10, Soyuz MS-12 | |

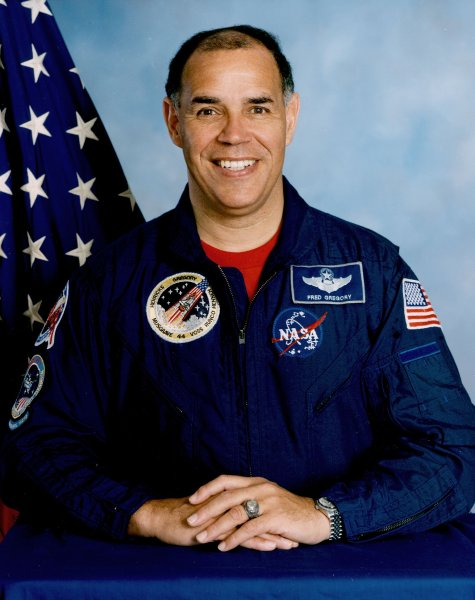
Frederick Gregory

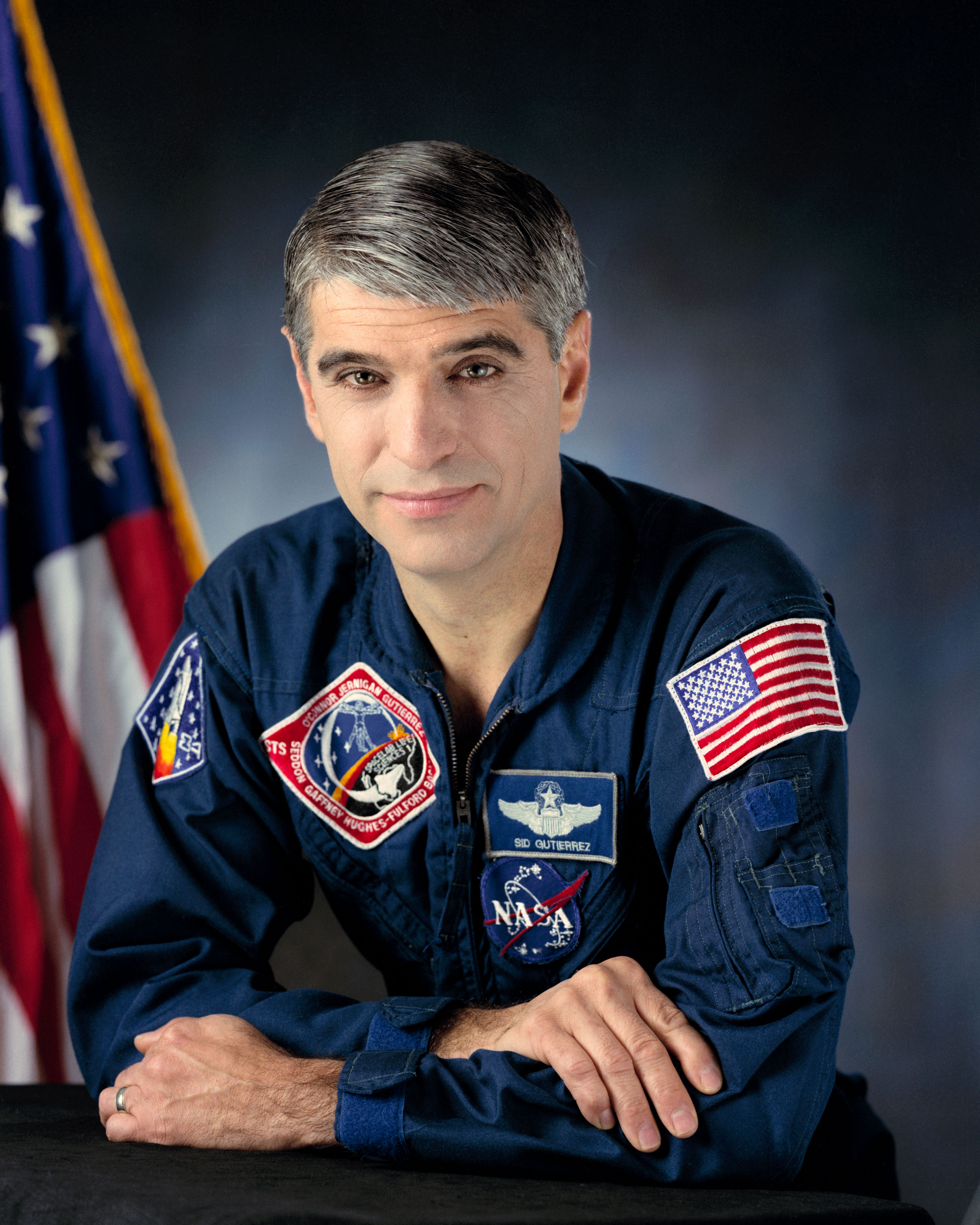
Sidney Gutierrez

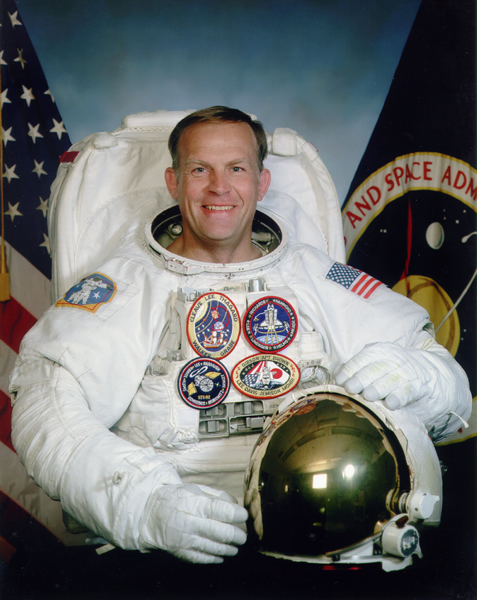
Mark Lee

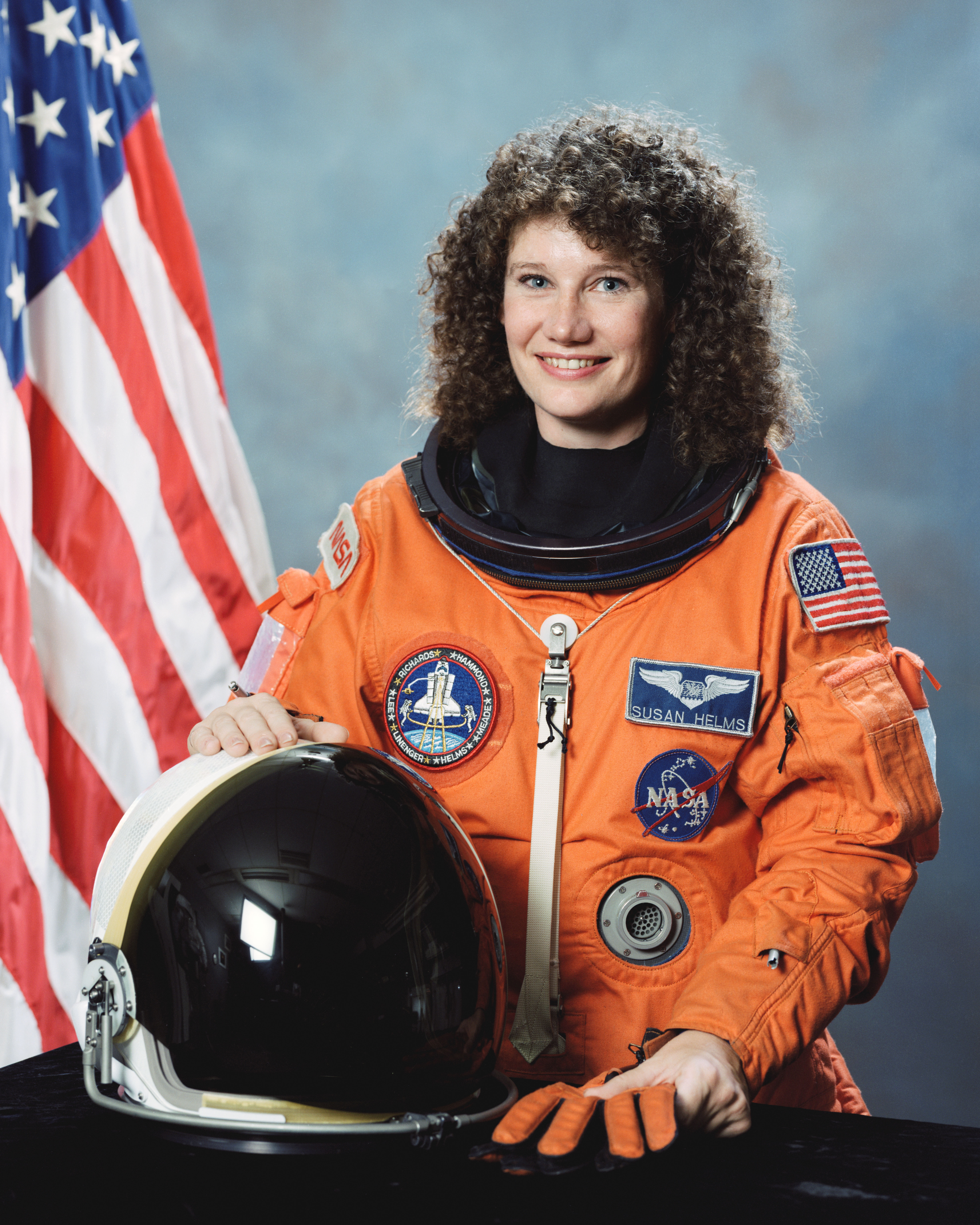
Susan Helms

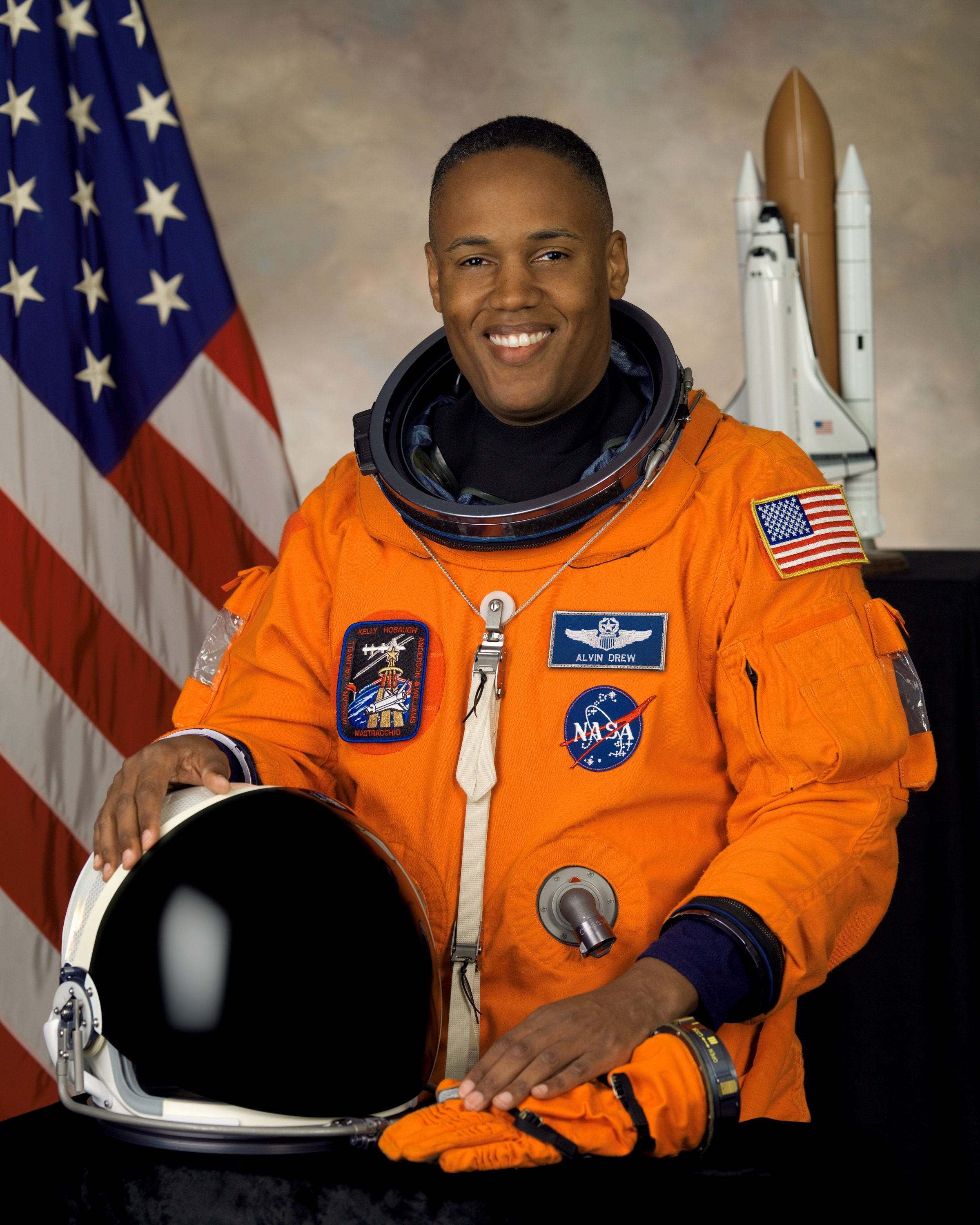
B. Alvin Drew

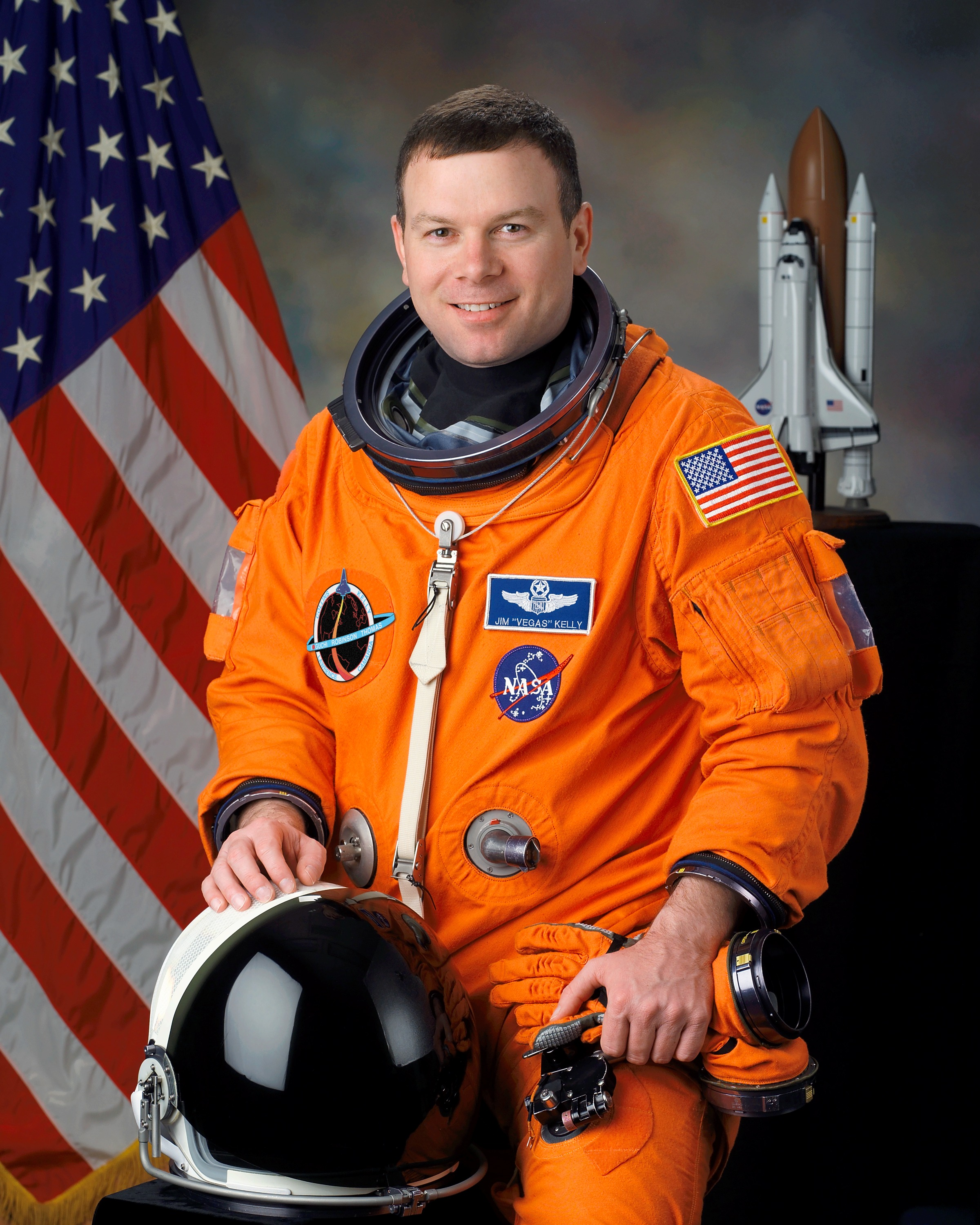
James Kelly

== Athletes ==
| Name | Class year | Notability | References |
|---|---|---|---|
| Brock Strom | 1959 | Air Force Academy’s first All-American; captain of the undefeated 1958 USAFA football team that tied TCU in the Cotton Bowl; inducted into the Upper Peninsula Sports Hall of Fame, Michigan, in 1977, the College Football Hall of Fame in 1985, the CoSIDA Academic All-America Hall of Fame in 1991, and the Air Force Academy Athletic Hall of Fame as part of the inaugural class in 2007 | |
| Gregg Popovich | 1970 | Head coach (1997–) of the National Basketball Association's (NBA) San Antonio Spurs who led the team to NBA championships in 1999, 2003, 2005, 2007, and 2014; three-time NBA Coach of the Year (2003, 2012, 2014) | |
| Len Salvemini | 1975 | 1972 Third Team and 1974 Second Team All American soccer player; holds Falcon career goals and points records; played for 1976 U.S. Olympic soccer team; played professionally in the Major Indoor Soccer League | |
| Randall W. Spetman | 1976 | Athletic director at Florida State University (2008–2013); former athletic director at the Academy (1996–2003) and Utah State University (2004–2008) | |
| Bob Djokovich | 1978 | Team handball player who competed in the 1984 Summer Olympics Los Angeles; 6th president of USA Team Handball | |
| Tom Schneeberger | 1978 | Team handball player, competed in the 1984 Summer Olympics Los Angeles, United States men's national basketball team player and ninth round draft choice of the Denver Nuggets in the 1978 NBA draft | |
| William Roy | 1981 | Former U.S. Olympian and world champion in skeet shooting; captain of 1996 U.S. Olympic shooting team; professor of English at United States Air Force Academy; Boeing 747 pilot for United Airlines | |
| Alonzo Babers | 1983 | Winner of two gold medals (400m and 4×400m relay) at the 1984 Summer Olympics; Boeing 777 pilot for United Airlines | |
| Kathy Callaghan | 1984 | Team handball player, competed in the 1988 Summer Olympics Seoul, won a gold medal at the 1987 Pan American Games Indianapolis, 1986 Military Athlete of the Year and coach of USAFA Team Handball | |
| Ted Sundquist | 1984 | General manager of Denver Broncos (2002–2008); director of College Scouting (1995–2001) | |
| Chad Hennings | 1988 | A-10 Thunderbolt pilot; winner of the Outland Trophy; football player for NFL's Dallas Cowboys (1992–2001); earned three Super Bowl rings; 2006 inductee into the College Football Hall of Fame | |
| Troy Calhoun | 1989 | Head coach of the Air Force football team (2006–); former offensive coordinator for the Houston Texans (2006) | |
| Dee Dowis | 1990 | USAFA quarterback 1987-89; set the NCAA Division I career record for rushing yards by a quarterback; Western Athletic Conference Offensive Player of the Year; inducted into the Air Force Athletics Hall of Fame as part of the Class of 2009 and the Colorado Springs Sports Hall of Fame in 2011 | |
| Bryce Fisher | 1999 | Played for Buffalo Bills, St. Louis Rams, Seattle Seahawks, Tennessee Titans | |
| Dan Nwaelele | 2007 | Basketball player, formerly in the NBA D-League and now with Levallois Metropolitans in France | |
| Chad Hall | 2008 | NFL wide receiver for the Philadelphia Eagles 2010–2012; wide receiver for San Francisco 49ers 2012–present | |
| Ben Garland | 2010 | NFL defensive end for the Denver Broncos 2010–2012; offensive guard 2012–present | |
| Tom Whitney | 2010 | Professional golfer, 2010–present | |
| Jim Walmsley | 2012 | Ultramarathoner, 2014–present | |
| Kyle Westmoreland | 2014 | First Air Force Academy graduate to make the cut at the U.S. Open (made at 2021 U.S. Open) | |
| Madison Tung | 2019 | Rhodes Scholar; first female wrestler on the Air Force Academy men's wrestling team | |

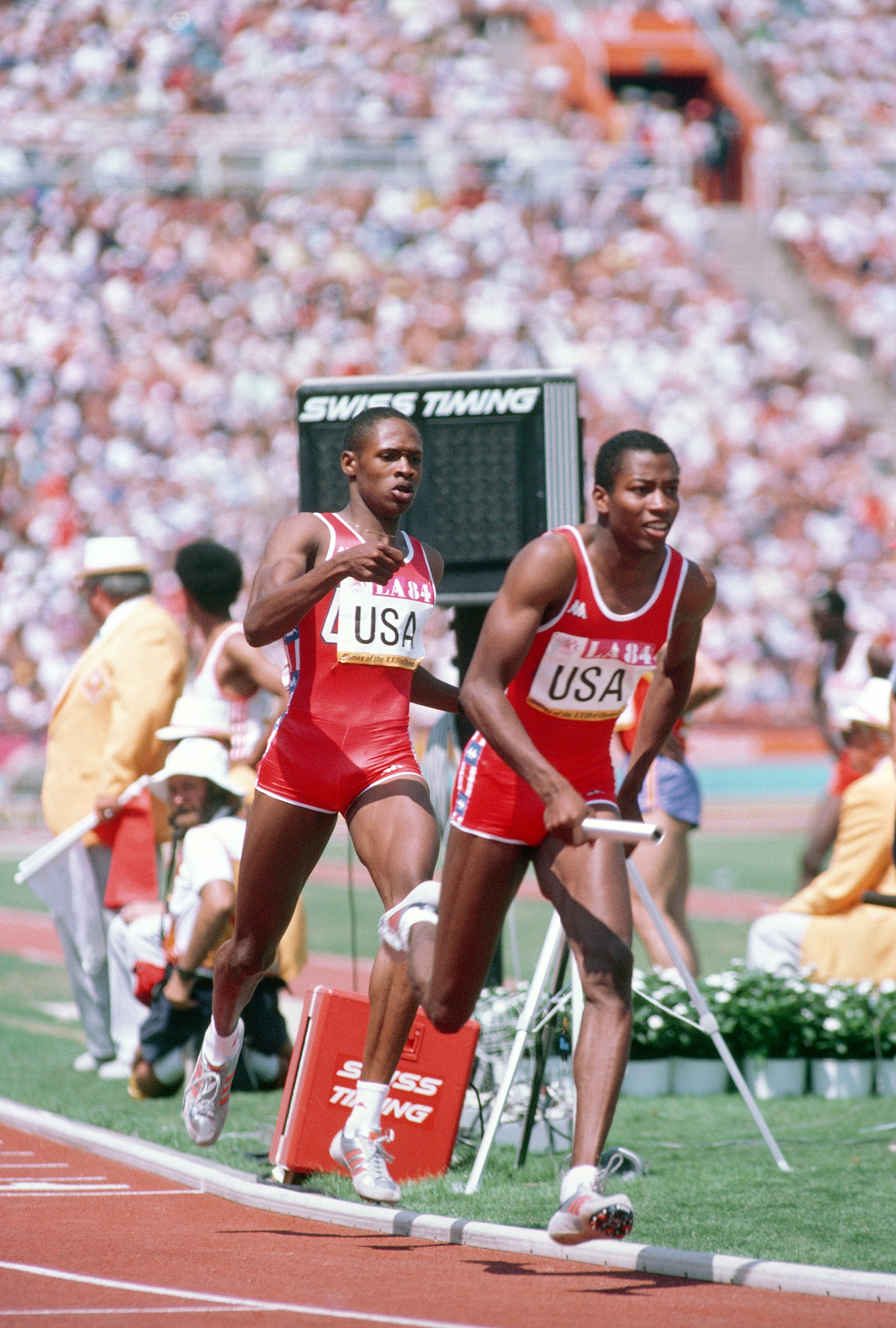
Alonzo Babers (with baton)

== Businesspeople ==
| Name | Class year | Notability | References |
|---|---|---|---|
| Gerard Finneran | 1959 | Expert on Third World debt during Wall Street career with Citibank, Drexel Burnham Lambert and TCW; known for 1995 air rage incident in which he defecated off a food cart | |
| T. Allen McArtor | 1964 | Senior manager, FedEx (1979–1987, 1989–1994); administrator of the U.S. Federal Aviation Administration (1987–1989); former CEO, Legend Airlines; current chair, Airbus, North American Holdings | |
| Richard T. Schlosberg | 1965 | Former president and CEO of the David & Lucile Packard Foundation; former publisher and CEO of the Los Angeles Times; Vietnam War veteran | |
| Robert J. Thomas | 1967 | Former president and CEO of Nissan Motor Corporation USA | |
| J.W. "Wild Bill" Stealey | 1970 | CEO of iEntertainment Network; founder of MicroProse Software and Interactive Magic | |
| Grady Booch | 1977 | Developer of the Unified Modeling Language and the Booch method in software engineering | |
| Charles E. Phillips Jr. | 1981 | President of the Oracle Corporation; served as captain in the United States Marine Corps after graduation from the academy | |
| Charles Patrick Garcia | 1983 | President of Sterling Hispanic Markets Capital Group | |

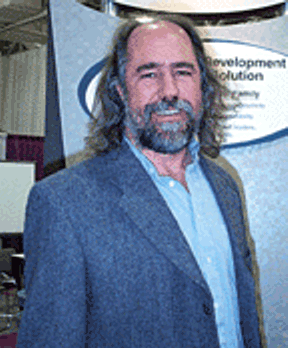
Grady Booch

== Civilian aviation ==
| Name | Class year | Notability | References |
|---|---|---|---|
| Chesley Sullenberger | 1973 | Captain who safely ditched US Airways Flight 1549 in the Hudson River | |
| LeRoy Homer | 1987 | Co-pilot of United Airlines Flight 93, which was hijacked and crashed in Pennsylvania on September 11, 2001 | |
| Charles Edward Jones | 1974 | Passenger on American Flight 11, flown into the North Tower of the World Trade Center on September 11, 2001 | |

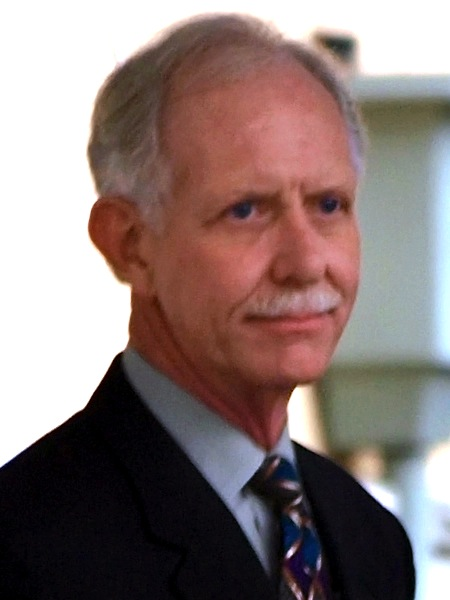
Chesley Sullenberger

== Government ==
| Name | Class year | Notability | References |
|---|---|---|---|
| Hansford T. Johnson | 1959 | General; first graduate to be promoted to the rank of four-star general (on October 01, 1989); assistant secretary of the Navy for Installations and Environment (2001–2005); acting secretary of the Navy (2003); pilot; Vietnam War veteran | |
| T. Allen McArtor | 1964 | Senior manager FedEx (1979–1987, 1989–1994); administrator of the U.S. Federal Aviation Administration (1987–1989); former CEO, Legend Airlines; current chair, Airbus, North American Holdings | |
| F. Michael Burkett | 1970 | Assistant minority leader of the Idaho State Senate (1989–1992, 2002–2008) | |
| Chuck Reed | 1970 | Mayor of San Jose, California (2007–); graduated first in his class and scored the maximum on the Physical Readiness Test; his daughter Kim Reed-Campbell was also first in her Academy class | |
| Gary A. Grappo | 1972 | United States ambassador to Oman (2006–); career Foreign Service officer | |
| William "T" Thompson | 1973 | Commissioner, Massachusetts Aeronautics Commission, Boston, MA (1983–2000); commissioner, Governor's Minority Business Commission (1987–1990); president and CEO, the Summit Group Companies (1981–2008); president and CEO, Association of Graduates, United States Air Force Academy (2008–), Colorado Aeronautical Board (2012–) | |
| John C. Inglis | 1976 | Brigadier general; deputy director of the National Security Agency (2006–2014); U.S. National Cyber director (2021–) | |
| Joseph R. McLaughlin | 1976 | Commissioned into the United States Army; infantry platoon leader in the 82nd Airborne Division; Republican member of the Onslow County, North Carolina Board of Commissioners, candidate for U.S. Congress challenging incumbent Walter B. Jones, Jr. for the Republican nomination in North Carolina's 3rd congressional district in 2008 | |
| James B. Smith | 1974 | Brigadier general; U.S. ambassador to Saudi Arabia (2009–2013); dean of Engineering, Technology, and Aeronautics at Southern New Hampshire University | |
| Michael L. "Mikey" Weinstein | 1977 | Legal counsel to the Reagan White House; committee management officer of the Iran-Contra investigation while assistant general counsel of the White House Office of Administration; founder and president of the Military Religious Freedom Foundation | |
| Geoff Mulligan | 1979 | Presidential Innovation Fellow serving the OSTP and NIST on Cyber-Physical Systems; co-creator of the White House SmartAmerica Challenge | |
| Steve Dickson | 1979 | 18th administrator of the Federal Aviation Administration | |
| Heather Wilson | 1982 | First graduate confirmed as secretary of the Air Force (2017–2019); Rhodes Scholar; U.S. representative from New Mexico's 1st congressional district (1998–2009); first graduate elected to the United States Congress; president, South Dakota School of Mines and Technology (2013–2017) | |
| Martha McSally | 1988 | Appointed to serve out remaining two years of late GOP Sen. John McCain's term by Gov. Doug Ducey (2019–2020); first U.S. Air Force Academy graduate to be appointed to U.S Senate; pilot; retired as a colonel in May 2010 after serving 22 years as a Fairchild Republic A-10 Thunderbolt II pilot | |
| Chee Meng Ng | 1991 | Singaporean politician, current secretary-general of the National Trades Union Congress; previously chief of Defence Force of the Singapore Armed Forces (SAF) 2013–2015 | |
| Jocelyn Mitnaul Mallette | 2007 | Secretary of the North Carolina Department of Military and Veterans Affairs | |

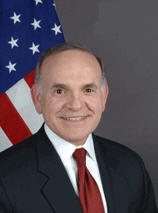
Gary Grappo

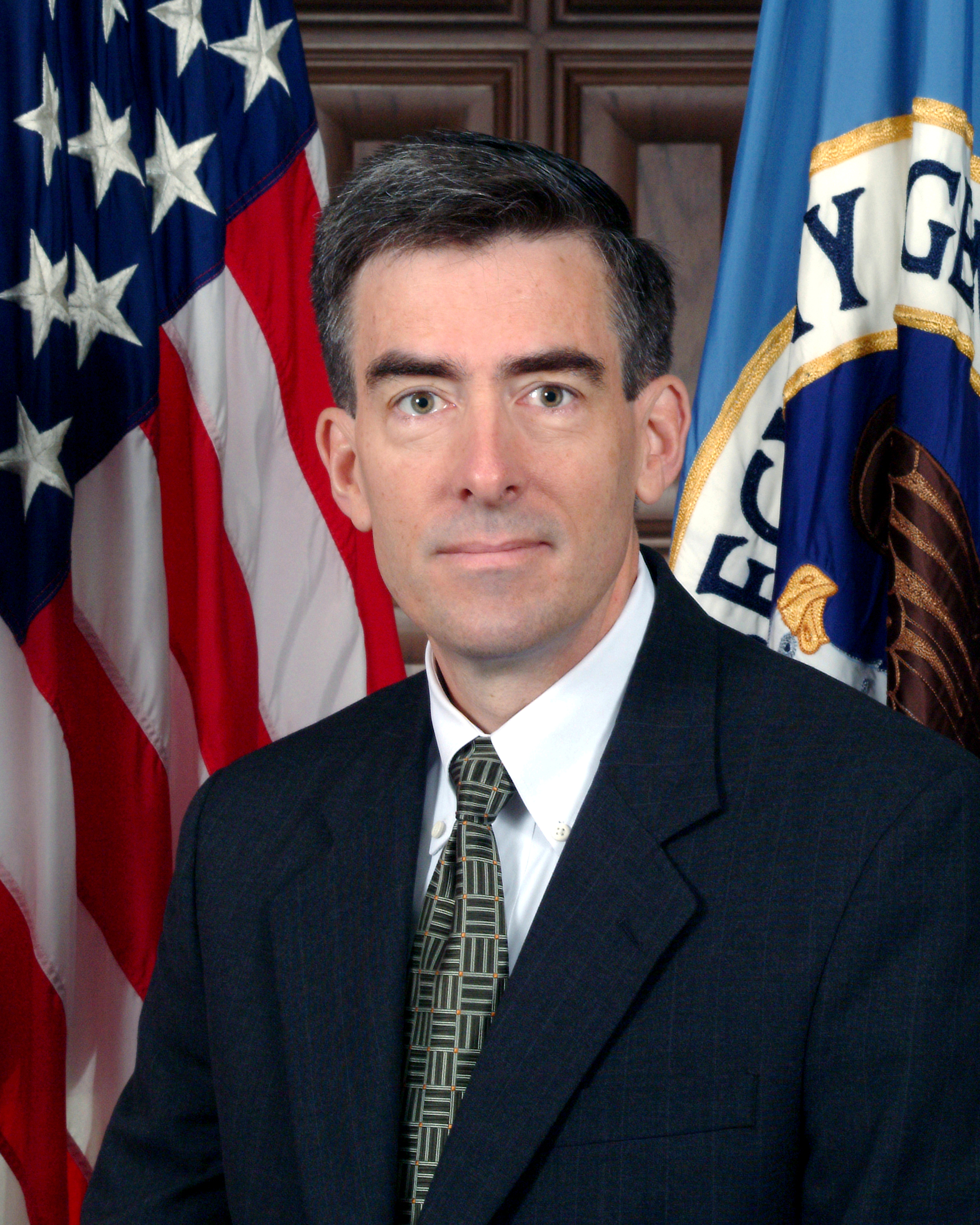
John Inglis

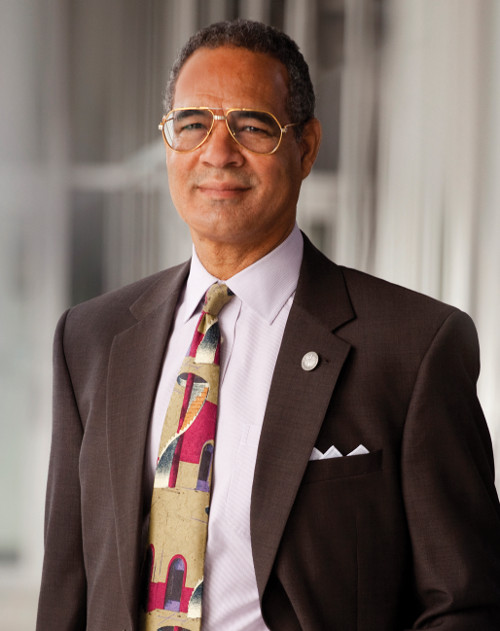
William 'T' Thompson

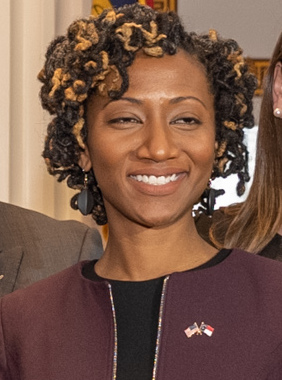
Jocelyn Mitnaul Mallette

=== Legislators ===
| Name | Class year | Notability | References |
|---|---|---|---|
| Kent Lambert | 1974 | Colonel; Colorado state representative (2007–2011); Colorado state senator (2011-2019) | |
| Matthew K. Fong | 1975 | Former chair of the Pension Benefit Guaranty Corporation advisory committee; treasurer of the State of California (1995–1999); Republican candidate for the United States Senate in the State of California in 1998 | |
| Bob Gardner | 1976 | Colorado state senator (2017–); Colorado state representative (2007–2013) | |
| Daryl Jones | 1977 | Florida state representative (1990–1992); Florida state senator (1992–2002); Florida gubernatorial candidate (2002); unsuccessful nominee for secretary of the Air Force (1998) | |
| Charlie Ross | 1978 | Fighter pilot; Mississippi state representative (1997–1998); Mississippi state senator (1998–2007) | |
| Heather Wilson | 1982 | Rhodes Scholar; U.S. representative from New Mexico's 1st congressional district (1998–2009); first graduate elected to the United States Congress | |
| Martha McSally | 1988 | U.S. representative from Arizona's 2nd congressional district (2015–2019); U.S. senator from Arizona (2019–2020) | |
| Don Davis | 1994 | U.S. representative from North Carolina's 1st congressional district (2023–) | |
| David L. Englin | 1996 | Virginia House of Delegates (2006–2012) | |
| Jennifer Parenti | 1995 | Lieutenant colonel; Colorado state representative (2022–) | |
| August Pfluger | | U.S. representative from Texas's 11th congressional district (2021–) | |
| Gregory R. Ball | 2001 | New York State Assemblyman (2007–2010) and New York state senator (2011–2014) | |
| Troy Stubbs | | Member of the Alabama House of Representatives | |
| Jose Castaneda | | Member of the North Dakota House of Representatives | |

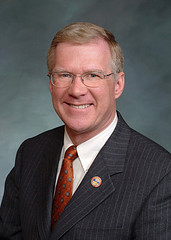
Kent Lambert

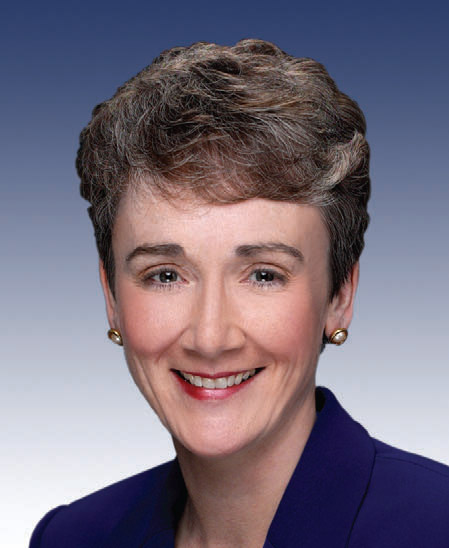
Heather Wilson

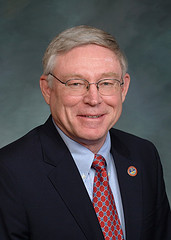
Bob Gardner

== Literary figures ==
| Name | Class year | Notability | References |
|---|---|---|---|
| Doug Beason | 1977 | Science fiction novelist; Ph.D in physics | |
| Susan Grant | 1982 | New York Times and USA Today bestselling author of more than 20 books; RITA Award winner; B-777 pilot, United Airlines; guest speaker (Class of 2015 Ring Dance) | |
| John Robb | 1984 | Author of Brave New War; Fourth Generation War theorist | |

== Air Force figures ==
=== Air Force chiefs of staff ===
| Name | Class year | Notability | References |
|---|---|---|---|
| John M. Loh | 1960 | General; commander, Tactical Air Command; commander, Air Combat Command, vice chief of staff, and acting chief of staff of the Air Force (1990–1991, acting); fighter pilot | |
| Ronald R. Fogleman | 1963 | General; first graduate to serve as chief of staff of the United States Air Force (1994–1997); fighter pilot; Vietnam War veteran | |
| Michael E. Ryan | 1965 | General; chief of staff of the United States Air Force (1997–2001); Distinguished Flying Cross recipient for aerial combat in Vietnam; father John Dale Ryan also served as chief of staff (1969–1973) and was a bomber pilot in World War II | |
| Norton A. Schwartz | 1973 | General; chief of staff of the United States Air Force (2008–2012); C-130/helicopter pilot | |
| Mark A. Welsh III | 1976 | General; chief of staff of the United States Air Force (2012–2016); A-10, F-16 pilot | |
| David L. Goldfein | 1983 | General; chief of staff of the United States Air Force (2016–2020); F-16 pilot | |
| David W. Allvin | 1986 | General; chief of staff of the U.S. Air Force (2023–) | |

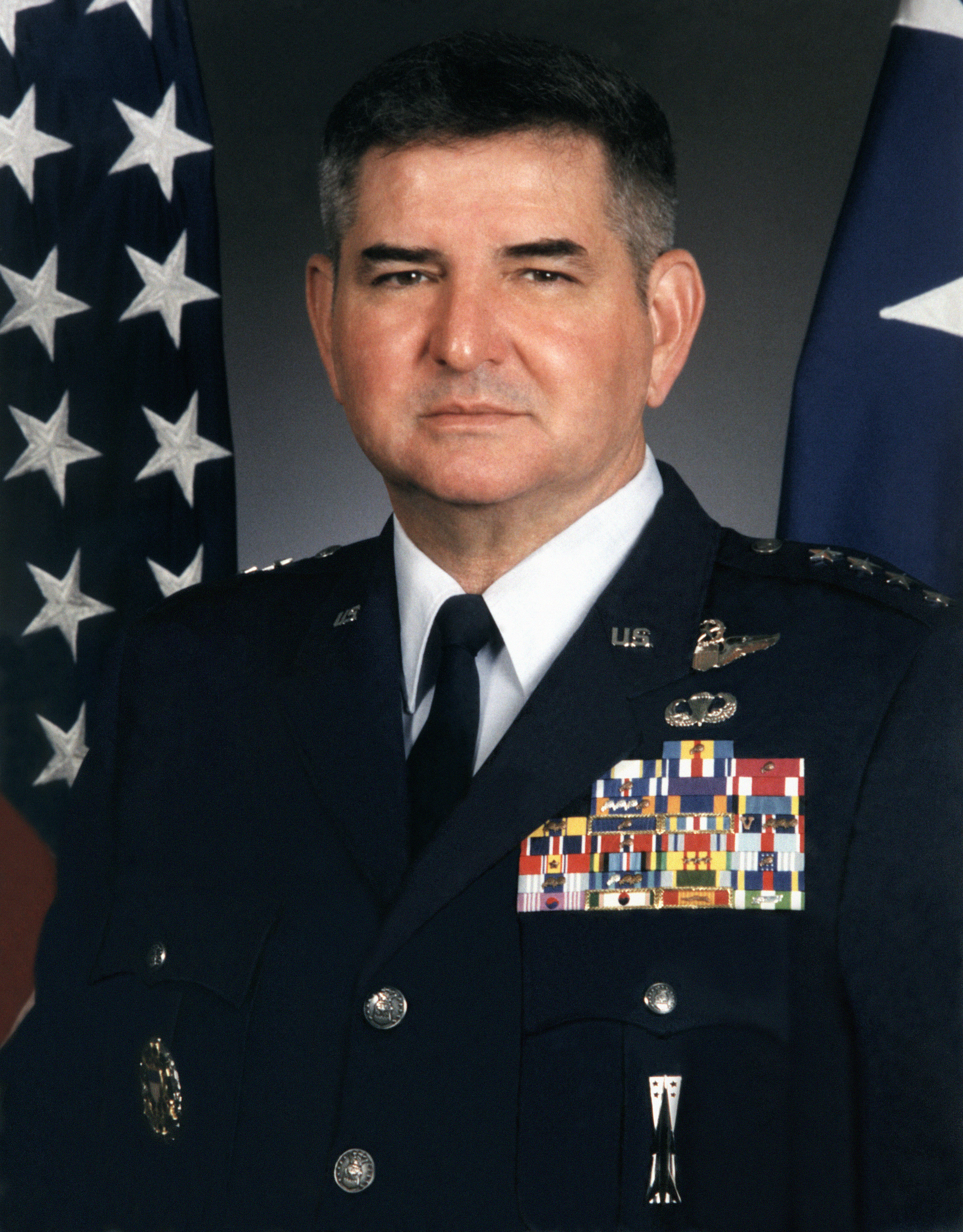
Ron Fogleman

=== Air Force vice chiefs of staff ===
| Name | Class year | Notability | References |
|---|---|---|---|
| Michael P.C. Carns | 1959 | General; vice chief of staff of the Air Force (1991–1994); fighter pilot; Distinguished Flying Cross recipient for aerial combat in Vietnam | |
| John M. Loh | 1960 | General; commander, Tactical Air Command; commander, Air Combat Command; vice chief of staff of the Air Force; acting chief of staff of the United States Air Force (1990–1991, acting); fighter pilot | |
| Ralph Eberhart | 1968 | General; commander, United States Space Command; commander, United States Northern Command; vice chief of staff of the Air Force (1997–1999); Distinguished Flying Cross recipient; combat veteran of Vietnam and Gulf War | |
| Duncan J. McNabb | 1974 | General; vice chief of staff of the Air Force (2008–2011) | |

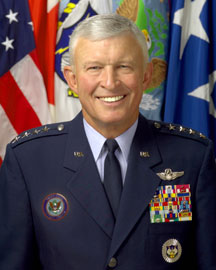
Ralph Eberhart

=== Commanders of Air Force major commands ===
| Name | Class year | Notability | References |
|---|---|---|---|
| Robert C. Oaks | 1959 | General; commander, Air Training Command; commander, United States Air Forces in Europe; fighter pilot | |
| Ronald W. Yates | 1960 | General; commander, Air Force Materiel Command; commander, Air Force Systems Command; test pilot; combat veteran of Vietnam War | |
| George Lee Butler | 1961 | General; commander, United States Strategic Command; Distinguished Flying Cross recipient; fighter and bomber pilot; combat veteran of Vietnam War | |
| Richard E. Hawley | 1964 | General; commander, Air Combat Command; Distinguished Flying Cross recipient (three); combat veteran of Vietnam War | |
| John G. Lorber | 1964 | General; commander, Pacific Air Forces; Distinguished Flying Cross recipient (two); fighter pilot; combat veteran of Vietnam War | |
| Howell M. Estes III | 1965 | General; commander, United States Space Command; commander, North American Aerospace Defense Command; commander, Air Force Space Command; Distinguished Flying Cross recipient (two); fighter pilot; combat veteran of Vietnam War | |
| William J. Begert | 1968 | General; commander, Pacific Air Forces; Distinguished Flying Cross recipient (two); pilot; combat veteran of Vietnam War | |
| Charles R. Holland | 1968 | General; commander, United States Special Operations Command; Distinguished Flying Cross recipient; AC-130 gunship pilot; combat veteran of Vietnam War | |
| Charles T. Robertson | 1968 | General; commander, United States Transportation Command; commander, Air Mobility Command; Distinguished Flying Cross recipient (two); AC-130 gunship, bomber, and tanker pilot; combat veteran of Vietnam War | |
| William R. Looney III | 1972 | General; commander, Air Education and Training Command; pilot; combat veteran of Operation Southern Watch | |
| John D. W. Corley | 1973 | General; commander, Air Combat Command; fighter pilot | |
| Frank Klotz | 1973 | Lieutenant general; Rhodes scholar; commander, Air Force Global Strike Command; missileer | |
| Stephen R. Lorenz | 1973 | General; commander, Air Education and Training Command; pilot | |
| Carrol Chandler | 1974 | General; commander, Pacific Air Forces; fighter pilot | |
| Donald J. Hoffman | 1974 | General; commander, Air Force Materiel Command; fighter pilot | |
| Douglas M. Fraser | 1975 | General; commander, United States Southern Command; fighter pilot | |

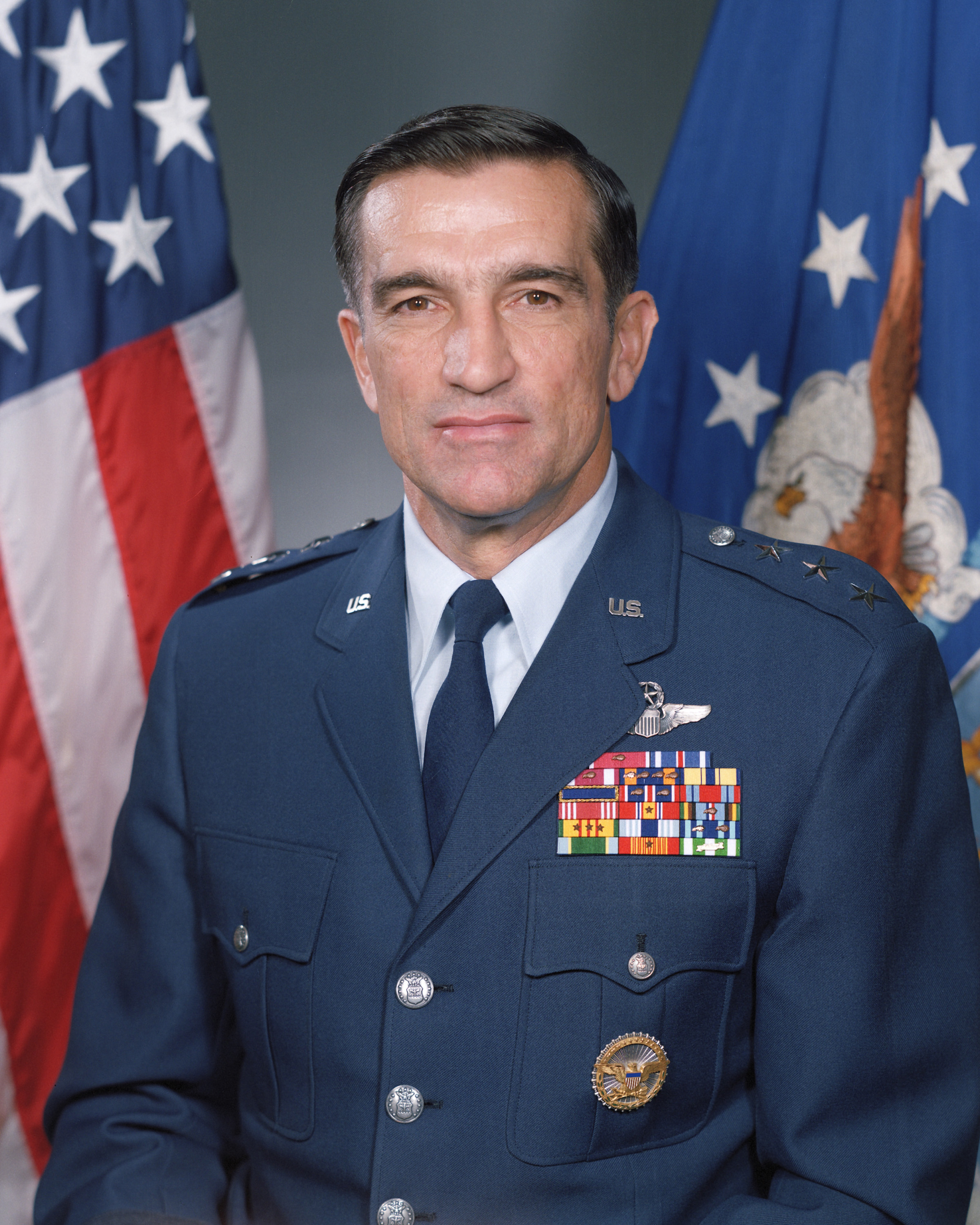
Robert Oaks

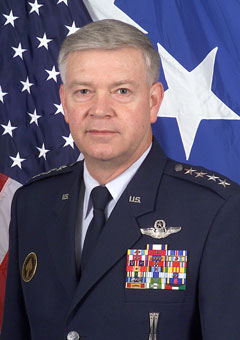
Charles Holland

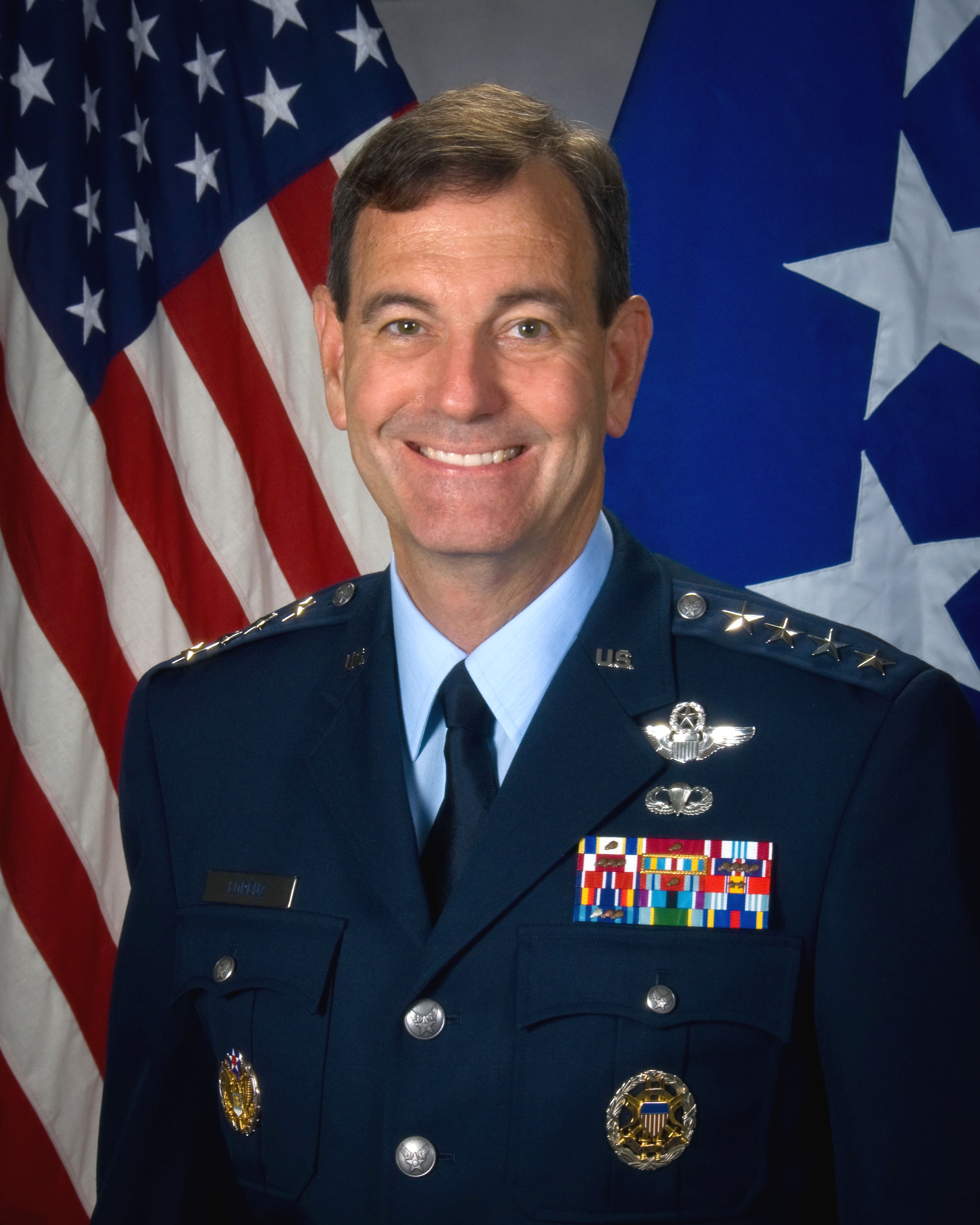
Stephen Lorenz

=== Notable Vietnam War combatants ===
| Name | Class year | Notability | References |
|---|---|---|---|
| James P. Ulm | 1961 | Brigadier general; commander of the 8th Flying Training Squadron and 14th Flying Training Wing | |
| Richard Stephen Ritchie | 1964 | Brigadier general; Vietnam War pilot flying ace; Air Force Cross recipient | |
| Robin G. Tornow | 1964 | Brigadier general; commander of the 334th Tactical Fighter Squadron; commander of the 405th Tactical Training Wing; commander of the United States Air Force Southern Air Division; commandant of the Air Force Reserve Officer Training Corps; recipient of the Silver Star and Legion of Merit | |
| Lance Sijan | 1965 | Captain; prisoner of war during the Vietnam War; fighter pilot; first graduate to be awarded the Medal of Honor; the Air Force Lance P. Sijan Award for leadership in one's career and personal life is named in his honor | |
| Nicholas Kehoe | 1966 | Lieutenant general; fighter pilot during the Vietnam War; inspector general, Office of the secretary of the Air Force; assistant inspector general in the U.S. Department of Housing and Urban Development (HUD); president and CEO of the Congressional Medal of Honor Society (2003–) | |
| Dale Stovall | 1967 | Brigadier general; Vietnam War rescue pilot; recipient of the Air Force Cross and Jabara Award; 12 successful rescue missions including Roger Locher, the deepest rescue inside North Vietnam | |
| Jeffrey Feinstein | 1968 | Colonel; Vietnam War weapons systems officer flying ace | |
| Michael Blassie | 1970 | First lieutenant; A-37B Dragonfly attack aircraft pilot; prior to identification of his remains, Blassie was the unknown service member from the Vietnam War laid to rest at the Tomb of the Unknowns (1984–1998) | |

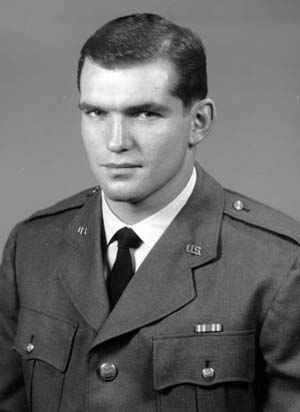
Lance Sijan

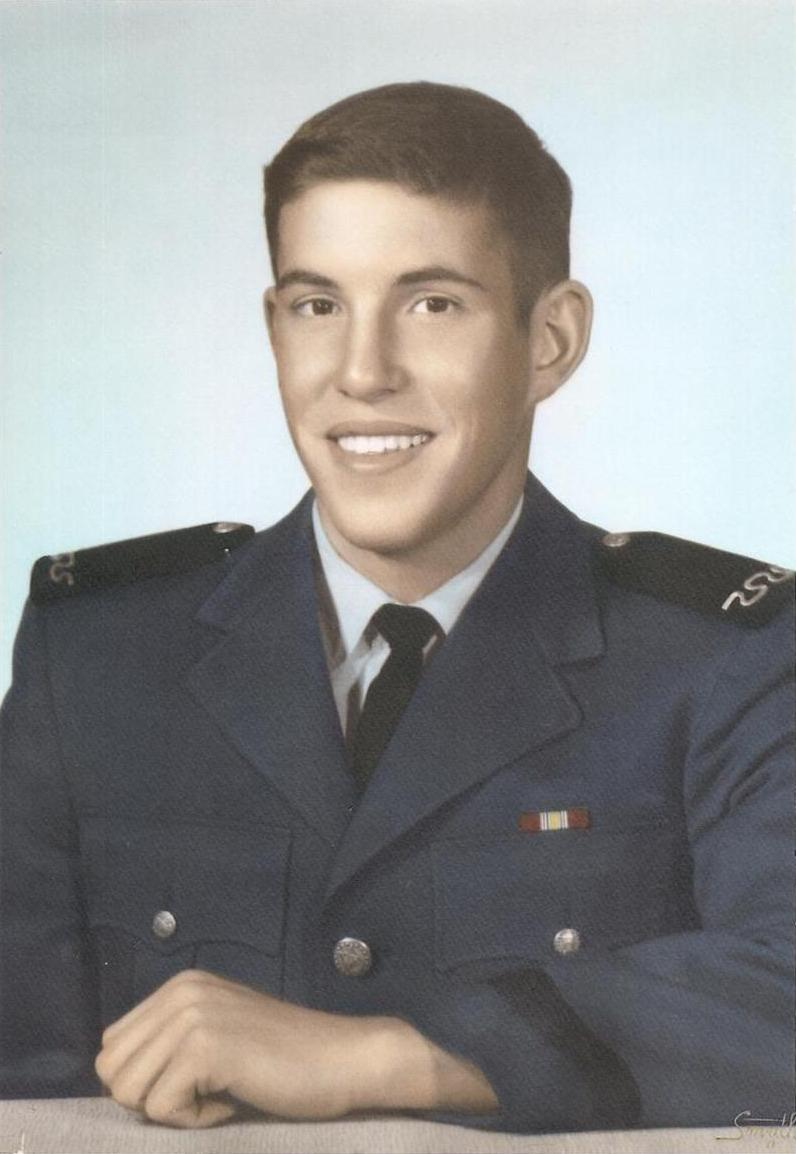
Michael Blassie

=== Notable Gulf War combatants ===
| Name | Class year | Notability | References |
|---|---|---|---|
| Patrick P. Caruana | 1963 | Lieutenant general; commander of the 14th Air Force; vice commander of Air Force Space Command | |
| John A. Warden III | 1965 | Colonel; noted air power theorist; Air Force Distinguished Service Medal recipient | |
| Charles C. Baldwin | 1969 | Major general; chief of chaplains | |
| John F. Nichols | 1979 | Brigadier general; commander of the Texas Air National Guard | |
| Brent Brandon | 1984 | Captain; EF-111 pilot who downed an Iraqi F-1EQ in an air-to-air engagement on the first day of Operation Desert Storm; Distinguished Flying Cross recipient for aerial combat during the Gulf War | |

=== Notable War on Terror combatants ===
| Name | Class year | Notability | References |
|---|---|---|---|
| Martha McSally | 1988 | Colonel; although American women had been flying combat missions in traditionally "non-combat" aircraft (airlift, tankers, helicopters) for years, she became the first American woman to fly a "combat" aircraft in combat since the lifting of the 1991 prohibition of women in combat; veteran of Operation Southern Watch and Operation Enduring Freedom; elected to Congress in 2014, representing Arizona's 2nd congressional district | |
| Kim Reed-Campbell | 1997 | Colonel; graduated first in her class, as did her father Chuck Reed; Distinguished Flying Cross recipient for aerial combat during the Iraq War | |
| Roslyn L. Schulte | 2006 | First lieutenant; first female academy graduate killed by enemy combatants in War on Terror in Afghanistan; awarded the National Intelligence Medal for Valor | |

=== Other notable Air Force graduates ===
| Name | Class year | Notability | References |
|---|---|---|---|
| Victor Joe Apodaca | 1961 | First Native person to graduate from the USAFA | |
| Erik A. Peterson | 1991 | Brigadier general, deputy adjutant general for Air of the Wisconsin National Guard | |
| Nicole Malachowski | 1996 | Colonel; first woman to serve as a pilot with the U.S. Air Force Thunderbirds | |
| Shawna Rochelle Kimbrell | 1998 | Major; first African-American woman to serve as a combat pilot | |
| Janet C. Wolfenbarger | 1980 | General; as of June 5, 2012, first female in the U.S. Air Force to attain the rank of general | |
| Charles V. Bush | 1963 | Officer; first African-American to graduate from the U.S. Air Force Academy | |
| Paul K. Carlton, Jr. | 1969 | Lieutenant general; Surgeon General of the U.S. Air Force; recipient of the Distinguished Service Medal; son of General Paul K. Carlton | |
| Charles C. Baldwin | 1969 | Major general; chief of chaplains of the U.S. Air Force; pilot; recipient of the Distinguished Service Medal with oak leaf cluster, Legion of Merit with oak leaf cluster, Distinguished Flying Cross with oak leaf cluster | |
| Scott A. Hammond | 1975 | Major general; commander and chief of staff of the Georgia Air National Guard | |
| Héctor Andrés Negroni | 1961 | Colonel, fighter pilot, historian, defense industry executive, first Puerto Rican to graduate from the U.S. Air Force Academy | |
| Susan K. Mashiko | 1980 | Major general; first female of Japanese descent from any military service to be promoted to flag/general officer | |
| Sharon K.G. Dunbar | 1982 | Major general; first military member of Korean descent to be promoted to flag/general officer; first woman to command the Air Force District of Washington and Hill Air Force Base | |
| Marc H. Sasseville | 1985 | Retired United States Air Force lieutenant general who served as the 12th Vice Chief of the National Guard Bureau and held senior command positions including commander of First Air Force and the 113th Wing of the District of Columbia Air National Guard. He was one of four fighter pilots scrambled in response to the September 11 attacks and was assigned to intercept United Airlines Flight 93. | |

== Space Force figures ==
=== Space Force vice chiefs of Space Operations ===
| Name | Class year | Notability | References |
|---|---|---|---|
| David D. Thompson | 1985 | General; vice chief of Space Operations (2020–); first USAFA graduate to make general in the Space Force; USAFA astronautics professor (1989–1992); Bachelor of Science in Astronautical Engineering | |

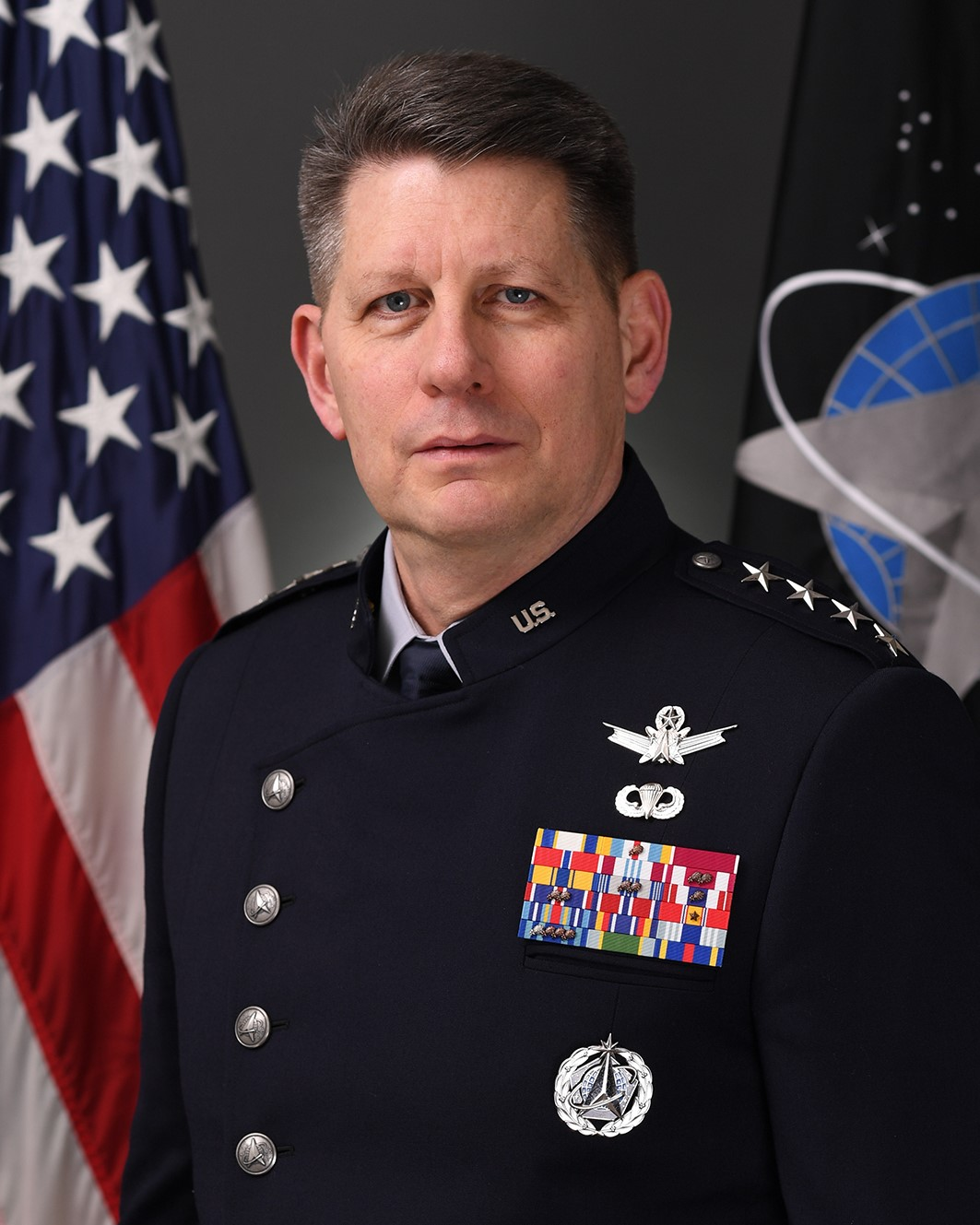
David D. Thompson

=== Commanders of Space Force Field commands ===
| Name | Class year | Notability | References |
|---|---|---|---|
| Stephen N. Whiting | 1989 | Lieutenant general; commander of Space Operations Command (2020–); first commander of a Space Force field command; Bachelor of Science in Aeronautical Engineering | |

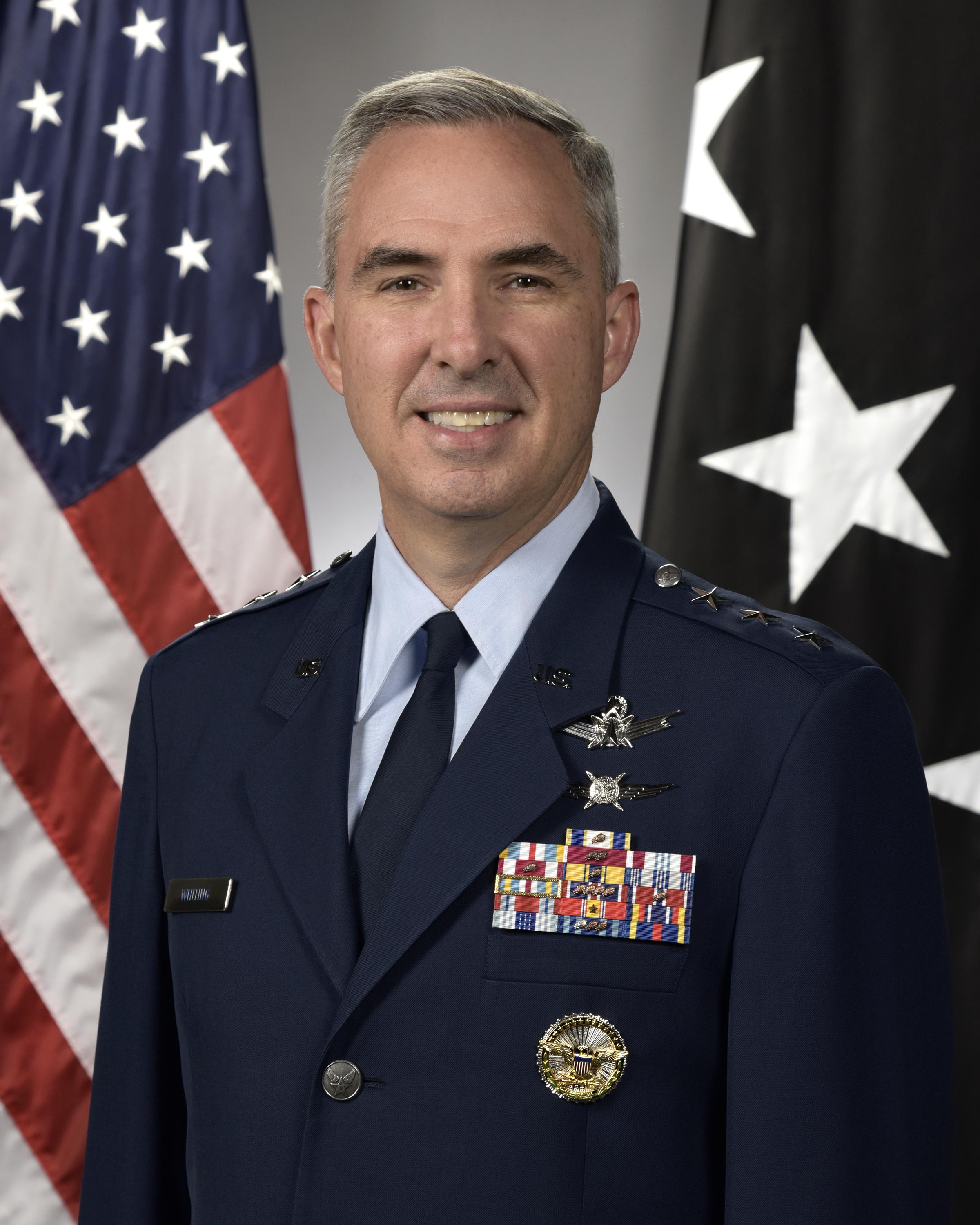
Stephen N. Whiting

=== Space Force general officers ===
| Name | Class year | Notability | References |
|---|---|---|---|
| Nina M. Armagno | 1988 | Lieutenant general; Space Force director of staff (2020–); first woman and first USAFA graduate to make lieutenant general in the Space Force; Bachelor of Science in Biology | |
| John E. Shaw | 1990 | Lieutenant general; deputy commander of U.S. Space Command (2020–); Bachelor of Science in Astronautical Engineering and minor in Russian Language | |

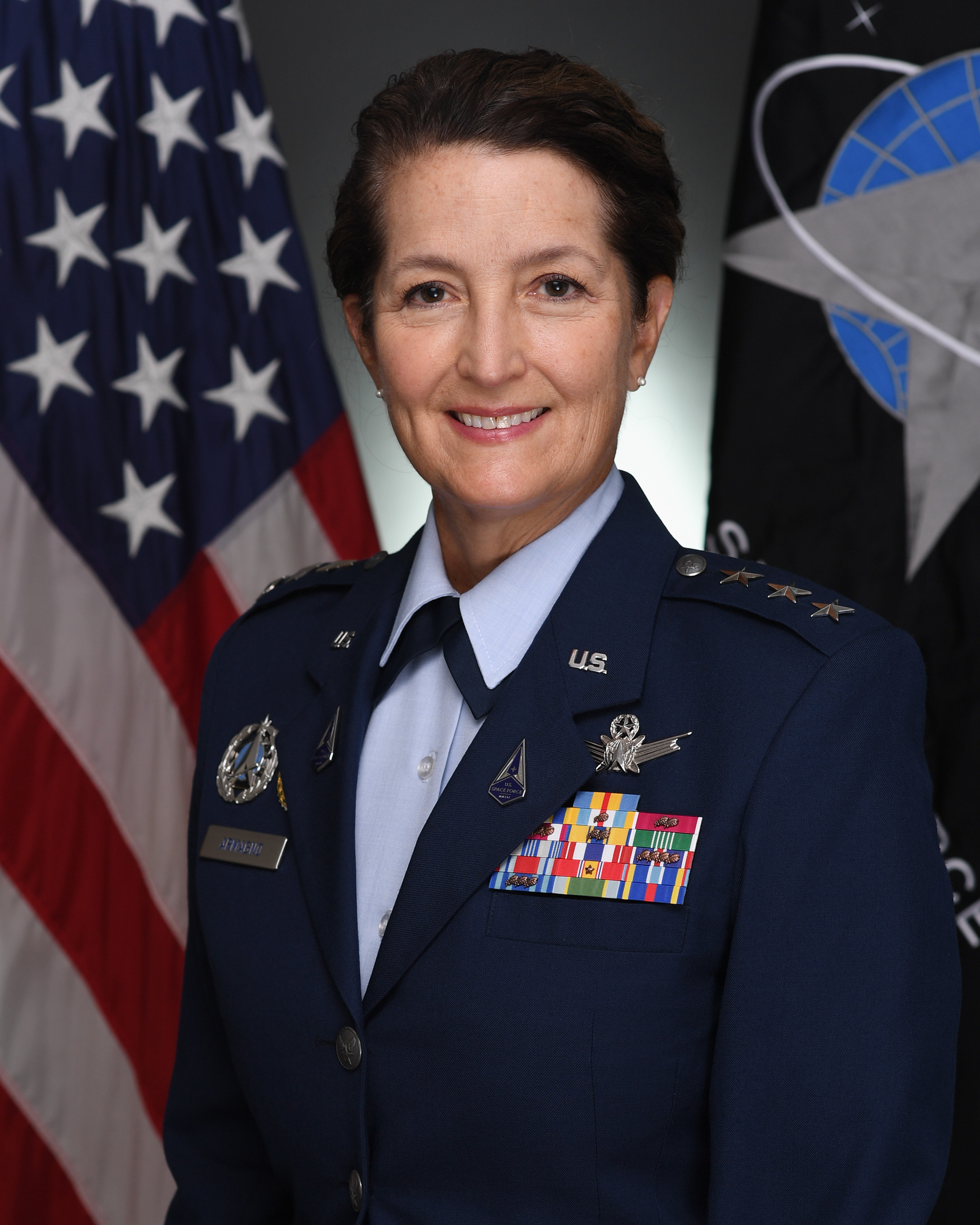
Nina M. Armagno

== Television figures ==
| Name | Class year | Notability | References |
|---|---|---|---|
| Reichen Lehmkuhl | 1996 | Winner of the reality game show The Amazing Race 4; model, author, and actor; ex-boyfriend of former 'N Sync member Lance Bass; autobiography Here's What We'll Say details his time in the Academy and as a commissioned officer in the Air Force under the military's "Don't ask, don't tell" policy | |
| Sam Eckholm | 2018 | Military-focused social media influencer, creator of one of the most watched aerospace video series in the world | |

== Non-graduates ==
As these alumni did not graduate, their class year is listed as "x-" followed by the class year they would have graduated, if known, and they are listed alphabetically by family name.

| Name | Class year | Notability | References |
|---|---|---|---|
| Brian Billick | x–1976 | Head coach of the NFL Baltimore Ravens (1999–2007) | |
| Harry Chapin | x–1964 | Singer | |
| Larry Cole | x–1968 | NFL football player for the Dallas Cowboys (1968–1980); earned two Super Bowl rings | |
| Brian Dubie | x–1981 | Pilot; lieutenant governor of Vermont (2003–) | |
| Derio Gambaro | x–1977 | Missouri House of Representatives member (1999–2003) | |
| Clarence Gilyard | x–1978 | Actor; associate professor in the College of Fine Arts Department of Theatre at the University of Nevada Las Vegas | |
| Alberto Gonzales | x–1979 | Attorney general of the United States (2005–2007), professor at Texas Tech University (2009–) | |
| Miles O'Keeffe | x–1976 | Television and movie actor | |
| Justin Olsen | unknown | Olympic gold medalist (2010) and World Champion (2009) in four-man bobsled | |
| Jody Powell | x–1965 | White House press secretary for President Jimmy Carter; expelled from the Academy during his senior year for cheating | |
| Anthony Schlegel | x–2005 | Football player with the NFL's New York Jets and Cincinnati Bengals (2006–2007) | |
| Paul Skenes | x–2024 | Baseball pitcher with the Pittsburgh Pirates; recipient of the 2022 John Olerud Award as the best two-way player in college baseball while at the Academy; transferred to LSU after his 2022 third-class season; received multiple national awards with a team that won the 2023 Men's College World Series; selected first overall in the 2023 Major League Baseball draft; National League Rookie of the Year in 2024 | |
| Jamil Walker | x–2003 | Major League Soccer player (2003–2007); 2003 MLS Cup champion | |
| Daniel Wasson | x–2006 | Major League Soccer player | |

== See also ==
- United States Service Academies Class of 1980 (first female cadets to graduate USAFA)
- United States service academies
- List of colleges and universities in Colorado
- Bibliography of Colorado
- Geography of Colorado
- History of Colorado
- Index of Colorado-related articles
- List of Colorado-related lists
- Outline of Colorado
