= Roslyn L. Schulte =

United States Air Force officer

Roslyn Schulte
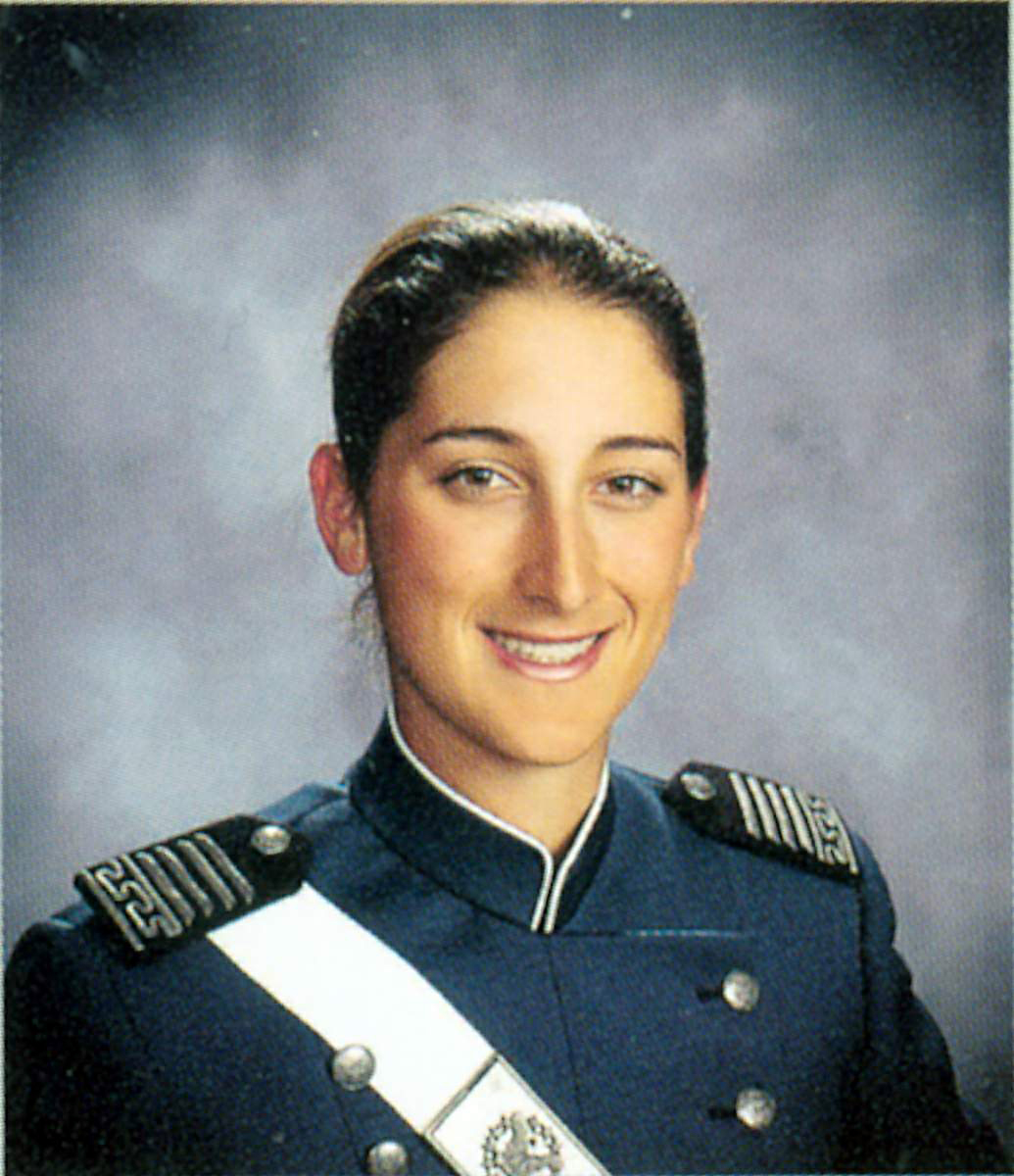
- Roslyn L. Schulte at the US Air Force Academy
- Born: March 18, 1984; St. Louis, Missouri, U.S.
- Died: May 20, 2009 (aged 25); Kabul, Afghanistan
- Burial place: New Mount Sinai Cemetery; St. Louis, Missouri, U.S.
- Military career
- Allegiance: United States of America
- Branch: United States Air Force
- Service years: 2006–2009
- Rank: First Lieutenant
- Nickname: "Roz"
- Unit: 613th Air and Space Operations Center
- Conflicts: War in Afghanistan
- Awards: Bronze Star; Purple Heart; National Intelligence Medal for Valor

Roslyn Littman "Roz" Schulte (March 18, 1984 – May 20, 2009) was a United States Air Force officer killed in action in the U.S. war in Afghanistan, making her the first female United States Air Force Academy graduate to be killed by enemy action and the second female graduate killed in action. She was posthumously awarded the National Intelligence Medal for Valor and the Hawaii Medal of Honor.

== Early life and education ==
Born on March 18, 1984, in St. Louis, Missouri, Schulte grew up in suburban Ladue, Missouri, and graduated from John Burroughs School in 2002. She was Jewish. Schulte served as an intern to former U.S. Sen. Wayne Allard of Colorado in 2005. She graduated from the U.S. Air Force Academy and was commissioned in 2006, part of the first class to have entered the academy after the September 11 attacks.

== Military service ==
Schulte was assigned to the Pacific Air Force 613th Air and Space Operations Center at Hickam Air Force Base in Hawaii, and was sent on deployment as an intelligence, surveillance and reconnaissance operations officer. Three months after she arrived in Afghanistan, she was killed by a roadside bomb near Kabul.

In addition to the Bronze Star and Purple Heart, Roslyn was awarded the Air Force Commendation Medal, Joint Service Achievement Medal, Air Force Combat Action Medal, National Defense Service Medal, Afghanistan Campaign Medal and NATO Medal.

=== National Intelligence Medal for Valor citation ===
Schulte was posthumously awarded the National Intelligence Medal for Valor on January 25, 2010, the first named female recipient. Her citation noted "her courageous efforts to teach Afghan military officials how to gather and interpret military intelligence" and said, "She died in Afghanistan en route to a Bagram Airfield meeting on the very issue that powers the IC: sharing intelligence."

Schulte was buried in her home state at New Mt. Sinai Cemetery in Affton, Missouri, a suburb of St. Louis.

== Legacy ==
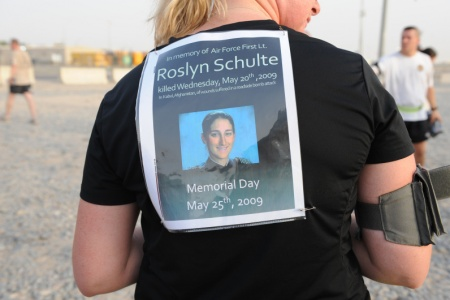
U.S. Navy Petty Officer 1st Class Kelli Roesch of Portland, Oregon, wears a sign to honor Schulte during the 2009 Memorial Day 5K run at a camp in the Middle East.

Two buildings near Kabul were renamed in Schulte's honor. At Camp Eggers, one of the buildings was designated "Roz's House"; at Sia Sang, a building was named "Schulte's Place."

In 2010, the Air Force Academy created the Lt. Roslyn Schulte Cadet Award to recognize a cadet who "embodies the same impeccable character, unwavering leadership, and spirit of service that distinguished Lieutenant Schulte."

In 2011, Goodfellow Air Force Base dedicated a training facility building in Schulte's honor.

The conference room in the ISRD of the 613th Air and Space Operations Center at Joint Base Pearl Harbor-Hickam, Hawaii is named after Schulte.

A conference room at 25th Air Force has also been dedicated in her honor.

== See also ==
- Women in warfare and the military (2000–present)
- National Intelligence Medal for Valor Recipients
- Notable War on Terror combatants
- John Burroughs School alumni
