= National Intelligence Medal for Valor =

United States military medal

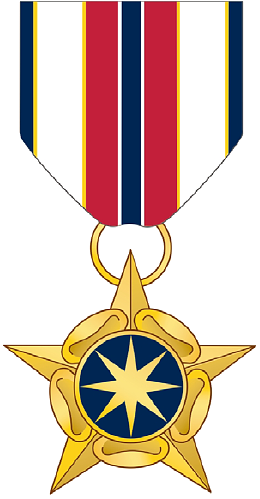
- National Intelligence Medal for Valor
- Type: Individual award
- Awarded for: Heroism and courage in connection with an Intelligence Community contribution to national security
- Presented by: United States Intelligence Community
- Eligibility: United States Government civilian and military personnel
- Status: Active
- Established: 1 October 2008
- First award: 14 November 2008
- National Intelligence Medal for Valor ribbon

Precedence
- Next (higher): National Intelligence Cross
- Next (lower): National Intelligence Distinguished Service Medal

The National Intelligence Medal for Valor (created as the Intelligence Community Medal for Valor) is a decoration of the United States Intelligence Community awarded by the National Intelligence Awards Program led by the Office of the Director of National Intelligence.

The Director of National Intelligence established the Intelligence Community Medal for Valor on 1 October 2008 to "acknowledge the exceptional and unrecognized accomplishments of members of the Intelligence Community." In 2009, the award was renamed the National Intelligence Medal for Valor.

== Criteria ==
The medal recognizes heroism and courage above and beyond the call of duty in service to the intelligence community or to overall national security. It is generally associated with clandestine operation in hostile countries.

Second only to the National Intelligence Cross, it is the equivalent to the military Silver Star. There are very few recipients of this medal, which almost exclusively awarded posthumously, and the identities of living recipients are closely guarded secrets.

== Recipients ==
The medal was first awarded on 14 November 2008, to Marine Corps Lance Corporal James E. Swain, who died on 15 November 2004, of wounds received while serving as a Marine Corps intelligence analyst during the Battle of Fallujah in Iraq. (The Swain Annex of the Marine Corps Intelligence Activity (MCIA) complex also bears his name.)

Its first recipient under its new name was Navy Petty Officer 1st Class Steven P. Daugherty, sometime before 21 May 2009.

Defense Department officials have released the names of five other recipients, all of whom received their medals posthumously: Air Force 1st Lieutenant Roslyn L. Schulte, who received it on 22 January 2010; Marine Sergeant Lucas T. Pyeatt, on 29 June 2011; and Marine Capt. Trevor J. Yurista, on 1 September 2011.Navy Petty Officer 1st Class Jared W. Day, 2012 and Navy Petty Officer 1st Class Michael J. Strange, 2012

As of June 2011, the medal had also been awarded to six living recipients whose names have been kept secret, according to DoD officials.

== See also ==
- Awards and decorations of the United States government
