= Victor Joe Apodaca =

American soldier, major

Major Victor Joe Apodaca Jr.
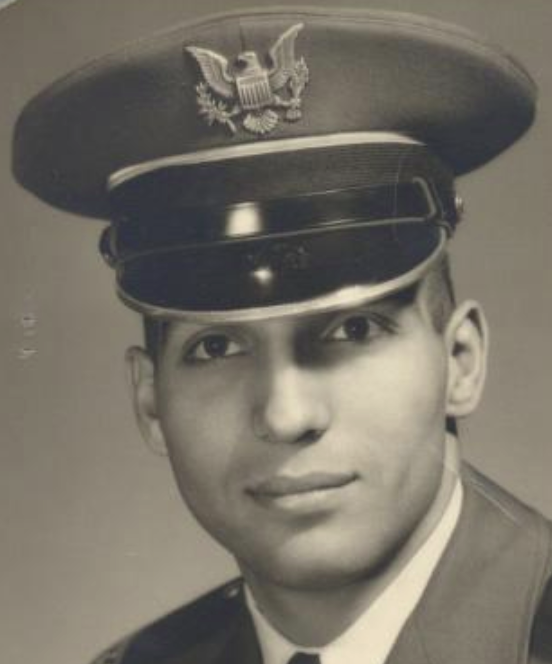
- Born: May 31, 1937; Sheridan, Colorado, U.S.
- Died: June 8, 1967 (aged 30); North Vietnam
- Burial place: U.S. Air Force Academy, Colorado Springs, Colorado
- Education: U.S. Air Force Academy 1961
- Spouse: Rosalind Apodaca Cain Holloman
- Children: Robert Apodaca
- Military career
- Branch: United States Air Force
- Rank: Major
- Awards: Air Medal; Distinguished Flying Cross

Victor Joe Apodaca Jr. (May 31, 1937 – June 8, 1967) was a major in the United States Air Force and the first cadet of Native ethnicity to graduate from the U.S. Air Force Academy.

== Early life ==
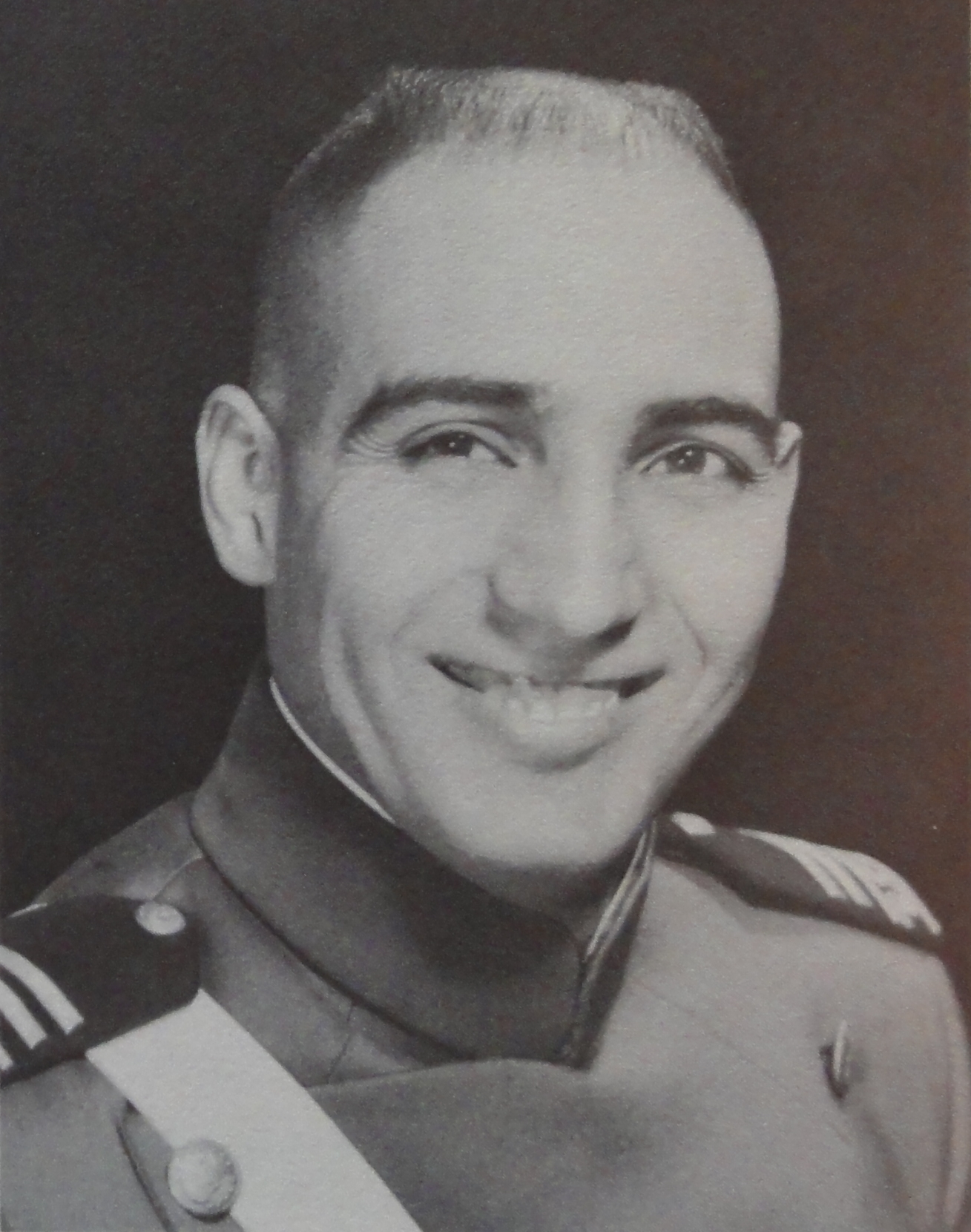
Cadet Apodaca in 1961

Victor Apodaca was born in Sheridan, Colorado on May 31, 1937. He attended the University of Colorado from 1955 to 1957 when he was accepted as the first Navajo cadet at the U.S. Air Force Academy in 1957. He graduated in 1961 and was sent to pilot training.

== Air Force career ==
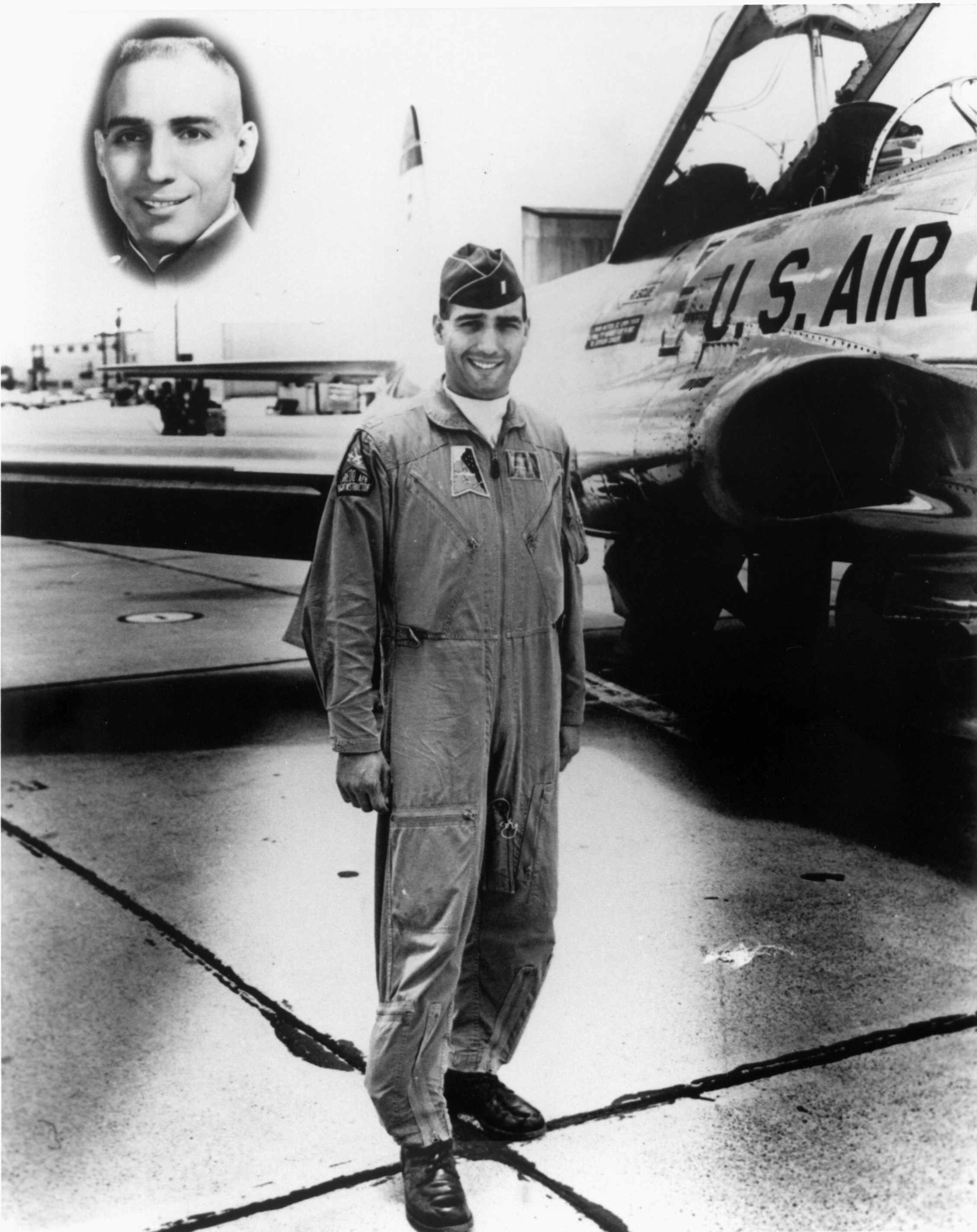
Maj. Victor Apodaca Jr., an F-4C pilot and 1961 Air Force Academy graduate, was shot down while performing a reconnaissance mission over North Vietnam on June 8, 1967. Apodaca was listed as missing in action for 35 years. Major Apodaca's remains were positively identified in September 2001. His son, Robert Apodaca, escorted his remains from Hickam Air Force Base, Hawaii to the Air Force Academy where he was laid to rest Sept. 15, 2001. (Courtesy photo)

Capt. Apodaca was trained as an RF-4C Phantom II reconnaissance pilot and was sent to Vietnam on 8 January 1967 and was assigned to the 389th Tactical Fighter Squadron of the 366th Tactical Fighter Wing at Da Nang Air Base. On 8 June 1967, Major Apodaca and his wingman Capt. Jon T. Busch were flying over Dong Hoi, North Vietnam when his Phantom was hit by ground fire. He reported problems with the hydraulics and then made no more radio contact. He was listed as Missing In Action (MIA) as was Busch who never made it back to base either. He was posthumously awarded the Air Medal and the Distinguished Flying Cross.

== Family struggle to find his remains ==
After Apodaca was declared missing, his sister Dolores Apodaca Alfond became active in organizations that tried to find Vietnam MIA/POWs and became the a founding member of the Washington State National Alliance of Families for the Return of America's Missing Servicemen.

On March 9, 2001, the Central Identification Lab-Hawaii identified the remains of Major Victor Joe Apodaca. His remains were interred September 15, 2001 at the U.S. Air Force Academy Cemetery.

Apodaca's sisters Alfond and Janella Apodaca Rose have expressed that the remains were not proven to be those of Major Apodaca.
