= William Thompson (aeronautics commissioner) =

William "T" Thompson
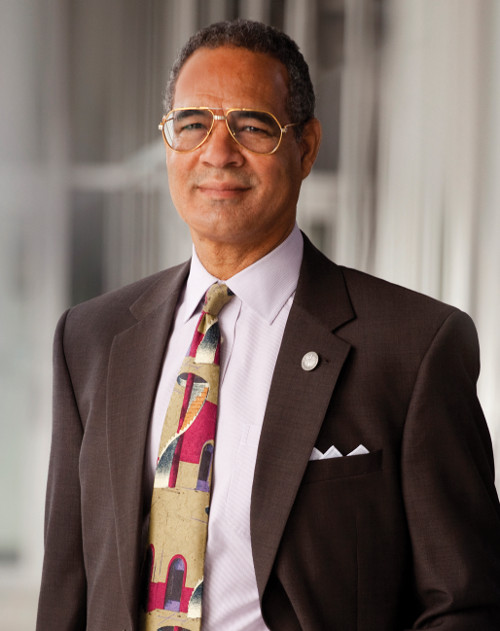
- Born: June 14, 1951 (age 75)
- Military career
- Allegiance: United States of America
- Branch: United States Air Force
- Service years: 1969–1980
- Rank: Captain

William LaMont "T" Thompson (born June 14, 1951) is a former president and CEO of the Association of Graduates of the United States Air Force Academy. A native of Orangeburg, South Carolina, he was one of the first African-American students to desegregate previously all-white Orangeburg High School in 1965. He became the first African-American from South Carolina to receive an appointment to the U.S. Air Force Academy in Colorado in 1969. Captain Thompson also had a twenty-five-year career with Delta Air Lines and was a Commissioner of the Massachusetts Aeronautics Commission. The longest serving Commissioner in its history, he has worked under both Democratic and Republican governors. Thompson was appointed by Gov. John Hickenlooper to the Colorado Aeronautical Board, effective 1 February 2013. He is also an attorney and member of the District of Columbia and Massachusetts Bars.

== Family, early life and education ==
William "T" Thompson resides in Atlanta, Georgia. Formerly married to Kathie Taylor, the couple had two daughters, Taylor and Sydney. They were divorced in 2001. Born in Orangeburg, South Carolina, he is the son of Pearl, an educator, and Willie J. Thompson, an educator and state administrator. Thompson was one of the first African-American students to desegregate the previously all-white, Orangeburg High School in 1965. While at Orangeburg High he played football, basketball and ran track, lettering numerous times. He was an academic standout and a perennial honor student. Active in the community, Thompson was also an Eagle Scout. He graduated in 1969 with a National Merit commendation, All-American honors in football and AAU recognition in track, and became the first African-American from South Carolina to receive an appointment to the U.S. Air Force Academy in Colorado. While at the Academy, he was a member of the 1971 Sugar Bowl Team, was on the Commandant’s list, attained the rank of Cadet Lt. Colonel and served as a member of the Cadet Wing Staff, the five man governing body of the school.

== Air Force service and higher education ==
After graduation from the academy in 1973, Lieutenant Thompson was appointed to a special assignment as the minority affairs advisor to the superintendent of the academy. In this position, which he was instrumental in creating; Lieutenant Thompson was responsible for increasing minority enrollment at the academy. The Minority Affairs Office has since grown into a thirteen-person staff and has been responsible for the recruitment of thousands of minority students to the Air Force Academy. After a year in this special assignment, Thompson entered jet pilot training in Valdosta, Georgia, finishing as the Outstanding Lieutenant in his class. He was selected for immediate entrance into Air Force Instructor Pilot School and held both the Instructor and Master Instructor designations during his 7-year tour in the Air Force. In addition to his flying duties, Captain Thompson held numerous positions of increasing responsibility, including Deputy Flight Commander, Chief of Wing Life Support, and the president of the Junior Officer’s Council. He also attended California State University, completing 15 units towards a Masters of History with a 3.9 GPA before opting to pursue a Juris Doctor degree at the University of the Pacific McGeorge School of Law. He separated from the service in 1980 to accept a pilot's position with Delta Air Lines and relocated to Boston, Massachusetts, to fly and to complete his final year of law school at Suffolk University. He completed his legal studies on dean's list, having been invited to solicit for Law Review.

== Delta Air Lines ==
Thompson began his employment with Delta Air Lines in August 1980 as a Second Officer on the Boeing 727 aircraft. During his twenty-five-year tenure with Delta, he progressed through several positions and aircraft and retired as a line check captain with an assignment to the Boeing 767-400 aircraft. As a line check captain, Thompson was responsible for both training and evaluating other Delta captains and co-pilots. In addition to his flying duties, Captain Thompson was an active participant in the Flight Operations Department, representing Delta at numerous conferences, expos and civic engagements. Additionally, he was active with the Air Line Pilots Association (ALPA) serving as chairman of the legislative affairs committee. As one of the aviation industry's few African-American commercial airline pilots, Captain Thompson was very active in the minority community. He has been a speaker at numerous inner city schools, helped establish a national scholarship program for minority students interested in aviation and served as committee chairman for the Joint National Convention of the Organization of Black Airline Pilots (OBAP) and the Tuskegee Airmen. Captain Thompson has received numerous indices of recognition from Delta Air Lines, ALPA and OBAP for his contributions.

== The Summit Group companies ==
Attorney Thompson is a member of the Massachusetts Bar and the Washington, DC Bar. He is certified to practice before the US Tax Court and is admitted to the Bar of the Supreme Court of the United States. He began the practice of law and also founded the Summit Group in 1982. Through growth, acquisitions and mergers, Thompson built the company into a small conglomerate which owned Subway, Dunkin Donuts and TCBY fast food franchises. The Summit Group also acquired a systems integration company, an engineering and testing company and a medical services firm. The company's offices were located in Portland, Maine; Boston, Massachusetts; Austin, Texas and Colorado Springs, Colorado. Thompson's accomplishments have been chronicled in numerous media outlets including The New York Times, The Wall Street Journal, Black Enterprise magazine, The Boston Globe, The Atlanta Journal-Constitution, PBS/Educational TV, NBC and CBS News and The Black Entertainment Network. Thompson was also nominated as Entrepreneur of the Year for Inc. Magazine and selected as an Outstanding Entrepreneur by the Bank of Boston.

== Government service ==
Thompson was appointed commissioner, Massachusetts Aeronautics Commission, by Governor Michael Dukakis in 1983, was re-appointed by Governor William Weld in 1990 and was re-appointed again by Governor Paul Celluci in 1999. In this position, he served coterminous with the governor and was responsible for general supervision and control over the state's 45 public-use airports and 200 private landing areas. He has the unique distinction of having served in both Democratic and Republican administrations. Commissioner Thompson was appointed to five consecutive 4-year terms and is the longest-serving commissioner in the commission's history. The Massachusetts Airport Managers Association and the Massachusetts Aviation Task Force honored Thompson for Fostering the Spirit of Aviation in Massachusetts. Additionally, Thompson was on the short list for consideration by President Clinton as Administrator of the Federal Aviation Administration during Clinton's first term and as Secretary of the Air Force during his second term. Thompson was appointed by Gov. John Hickenlooper to the Colorado Aeronautical Board, effective 1 February 2013, and was re-appointed to a second term in 2016.

== Retirement from Delta and business, later works ==
Thompson sold his business interests in 2000–2001 and took an early retirement from Delta Air Lines in 2005. He devoted his energies to speaking and writing, giving back to the community and spending time with his family. In 2005 he co-authored a self-help book entitled Conversations On Success with John Gray (author of Men Are from Mars, Women Are from Venus) and self-help authors Brian Tracy and Jim Rohn. In 2008, he came out of retirement to become president and CEO of the Association of Graduates at his alma mater, the United States Air Force Academy. He retired from this position on June 30, 2017. Under his leadership the association grew substantially. The number of local chapters increased from 30 to 86, revenue more than doubled and assets grew from $35 million to over $56 million. For the organization's many accomplishments, Thompson was recognized internationally in 2015 as one of the most innovative business leaders.

== Awards and decorations ==
Air Force Commendation Medal
Air Force Outstanding Unit Award with two oak leaf clusters
National Defense Service Medal
Vietnam Service Medal
Air Force Longevity Service Award
Small Arms Expert Marksmanship Ribbon

Badges

- Air Force Pilot
- Parachutist
- Delta Air Lines Captain
