= Coeur d'Alene Reservation =

Native American reservation in Idaho, United States

- Indian reservation
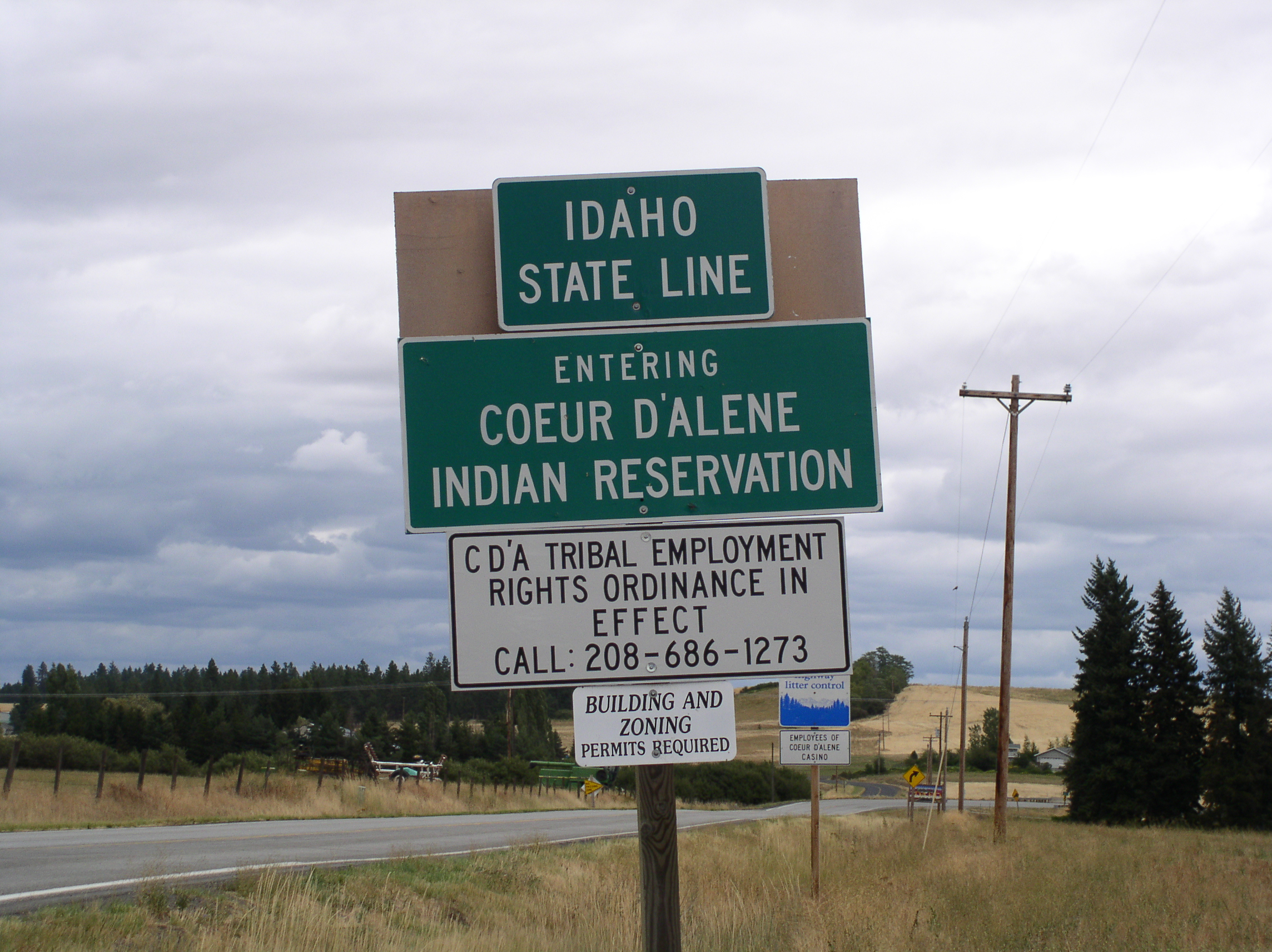
- Entrance sign

- Location of Coeur d'Alene Reservation
- Coordinates: 47°18′14″N 116°49′38″W
- Tribe: Coeur d'Alene
- Country: United States
- State: Idaho
- County: Benewah County and Kootenai County

Area
  - Total: 1,356.531 km^{2} (523.760 sq mi)
- Website: www.cdatribe-nsn.gov

The Coeur d'Alene Reservation is a Native American reservation in northwestern Idaho, United States. It is home to the federally recognized Coeur d'Alene, one of the five federally recognized tribes in the state.

It is located in parts of Benewah and Kootenai counties. The land area is 523.76 square miles (1,356.5 km^{2}) and it had a population of 6,551 residents at the 2000 census. The largest city entirely within the reservation is Plummer, with a population of more than 1,000 in the 2010 census.

Part of the larger city of St. Maries, the county seat of Benewah County, extends onto the reservation's eastern end. Some 734 of the city's 2,652 residents reside in this area of the reservation.

== History and origin ==
Considered as "where the old ones walked," the Coeur d'Alene Reservation came to fruition by the tribesmen using the surrounding resources to fish and hunt. The name, "Coeur d'Alene," meaning "Heart of the Awl," was given from a French trapper in the late 18th or early 19th century, recognizing the sharp trading skills the tribe displayed.

The Coeur d'Alene territory, acquired by the United States under an 1846 treaty with Great Britain, saw numerous settlers from eastern United States move in the same decade. Following the defeat of local tribes in the Skitswish War of May–September 1858, more people were attracted to the territory after the discovery of silver in 1863 in the northern Idaho panhandle region near the city of Coeur d'Alene. People eventually discovered large amounts of silver through mining in this area.

Through executive order, President Ulysses S. Grant established this reservation to be federally recognized in 1873. Ultimately, this move decreased the size of the lands to approximately 600,000 acres (940 sq mi; 2,400 km^{2}), where disagreement was received from the current Chief Peter Mocetelme, including a meeting between the chief and President Ulysses S. Grant. If the executive order was to be approved, one-third of the original Coeur d'Alene land was set to be sold to other white settlers.

The Tribe never saw a ratification of the executive order to be federally recognized or receive any compensation as of 1885. The Tribe made an effort to regain Congress' attention again in order to make an official peace treaty. Through several government actions, a boundary was put in place on the Lake Coeur d'Alene, eventually decreasing the size of the lands to approximately 345,000 acres (539 sq mi; 1,400 km^{2}).

Land disputes would still continue, and in 1997, the United States Supreme Court case Idaho v. Coeur d'Alene Tribe of Idaho held that the Coeur d'Alene tribe could not continue taking claim to Lake Coeur d'Alene. Another similar case in 2001, Idaho v. United States, ruled in favor of the federal government.

== Geography ==
Map of the Coeur d'Alene Indian Reservation and neighbouring reservations (In blue).

Spanning over eastern Washington, north Idaho, and western Montana, also referred to as the Panhandle region of Idaho, the Coeur d'Alene's and the neighboring tribes originally lived on over 3,500,000 acres (5,500 sq mi; 14,000 km^{2}) of land. The region was diverse and contained numerous varied biomes, from forested mountains to marshes and lakes. The Coeur d'Alene tribe is located south of Bonner county, west of Shoshone county, and north of Benewah county. It borders Washington, being directly east of Spokane Valley. At the center of the reservation was Lake Coeur d'Alene.

The tribe hunted and gathered several fish including cutthroat trout, anadromous salmon, and steelhead. Cutthroat trout were originally harvested in the St. Joe River and the Coeur d'Alene Lake. Today, the trout only exists in the Coeur d'Alene Basin to be harvested.

== Demographics ==
Consisting of over 2,190 current members, the Coeur d'Alene people were established as non-nomadic. Back from 1947 to current day, the Coeur d'Alene tribe has tribal leaders that oversee issues within the tribe. The council they presume consists of a chairman, vice-chairman, secretary-treasurer, and several council members. The chairman and vice-chairmen may interact with the federal government.

== Economy/Trading ==
Trading was at the forefront of the Coeur d'Alene, being described by a past Frenchman fur trader as "the greatest traders in the world." The land provided ample amounts of resources, allowing for the tribe to be stationary and non-nomadic while being able to establish farms and a "productive agriculture." Fish, quarry, waterfowl, nuts, and berries all derived from the bodies of water, mountains, grassy lands, and wetlands nearby.

The Coeur d'Alene tribe is allowed to earn money through corporate form, and all economic development and lease agreements must be approved. The tribe's primary economic development stems from agriculture and gaming. They employ around 1,000 people in both economic sectors. The tribe produces several crops on a 6,000-acre (9.4 sq mi; 24 km^{2}) farm, but they also have farmland for turf farming and logging. For gaming, the tribe operates the Coeur d'Alene Casino, Resort, and Hotel, earning around $20 million in profit per year. Among other economic sectors, the Coeur d'Alene tribe also is involved in an automotive center, hardware center, food markets, and a medical center.

== Communities ==
- Conkling Park
- De Smet
- Harrison (part, population 267 persons)
- Parkline
- Plummer
- Rockford Bay
- St. Maries (part, population 734 persons)
- Tensed
- Worley

== Notable residents ==
- Mildred Bailey
