= Coeur d'Alene language =

Endangered Salishan language of the US

Coeur d'Alene
- Snchitsu’umshtsn
- Native to: United States of America
- Region: northern Idaho
- Ethnicity: Coeur d'Alene people
- Native speakers: 4 (2007)
- Language family: Salishan: Interior Salish; Southern; Coeur d'Alene

Language codes
- ISO 639-3: crd
- Glottolog: coeu1236
- ELP: Coeur d'Alene
- Coeur d'Alene is classified as Critically Endangered by the UNESCO Atlas of the World's Languages in Danger.

Coeur d'Alene (French: Cœur d'Alène), known to its speakers as Snchitsu’umshtsn, is a Salishan language. It was spoken by only two of the 800 individuals in the Coeur d'Alene Tribe on the Coeur d'Alene Reservation in northern Idaho, United States in 1999. It is considered an endangered language. However, as of 2014, two elders in their 90s remain who grew up with Cœur d'Alène as their first language, and the use of the language is spreading among all age groups.

The Coeur d'Alene Names-Places Project visits geographic sites on the reservation recording video, audio, and still photos of Tribal elders who describe the site in both English and Coeur d'Alene languages.

The Coeur d'Alene Tribal Language Program and elders have actively promoted the use of the language, and have created computer sounds that use Snchitsu’umshtsn phrases. Radio station KWIS FM 88.3 in Plummer, Idaho, offers programming to preserve the Snchitsu’umshtsn language.

Lawrence Nicodemus, "a retired judge and former tribal council member," became a scholar of the language. He had worked with linguist Gladys Reichard in his youth, and went on to create a grammar, dictionary, and instructional materials. Nicodemus taught language classes until his death at age 94. The Coeur d'Alene Tribe's language program has "taught classes and worked with the language department to record more than 2,000 hours of audio and video." Classes are also available at North Idaho College.

== Phonology ==
=== Consonants ===
In Coeur d'Alene, there are eleven places of articulation: labial, alveolar, palatoalveolar, lateral, labiovelar, uvular, labio-uvular, coronal pharyngeal, pharyngeal, labiopharyngeal, and laryngeal. Doak identifies six manners of articulation: plain and glottalized voiceless stops and affricates, voiced stops and affricate, voiceless fricatives, and plain and glottalized resonants.

		Labial	Alveolar			Palatal	Velar	Uvular/ Pharyngeal		Glottal
		Labial	plain	sibilant	lateral	Palatal	labial	plain	labial	Glottal
Stop	tenuis	p	t	t͡s ⟨c⟩		t͡ʃ ⟨č⟩	kʷ	q	qʷ	ʔ
Stop	ejective	pʼ	tʼ	t͡sʼ ⟨cʼ⟩		t͡ʃʼ ⟨čʼ⟩	kʷʼ	qʼ	qʷʼ	
Stop	voiced	b	d			d͡ʒ ⟨ǰ⟩	ɡʷ			
Fricative				s	ɬ ⟨ł⟩	ʃ ⟨š⟩	xʷ	χ ⟨x̣⟩	χʷ ⟨x̣ʷ⟩	h
Sonorant	plain	m	n		l	j ⟨y⟩	w	ʕ	ʕʷ	
Sonorant	glottalic	ˀm	ˀn		lˀ	jˀ ⟨yʼ⟩	wˀ	ʕˀ	ʕʷˀ	
Rhotic	plain		r							
Rhotic	glottalic		rˀ							

=== Vowels ===
Vowel inventory
	Front	Central	Back
High	i		u
Mid	e (Note: Doak explains that /ɛ/ ranges freely between [e], [ɛ], and [æ] with /ɛ/ being the most common variant. Above, the phoneme /e/ has been used as Doak does.)	(ə) (Note: The schwa /ə/ only occurs unstressed as a reduced form of some unstressed vowels. It is also used by speakers to break up consonant clusters.)	o
Low		a	

== Orthography ==
There are three different orthographies, giving the interpretations of previous scholarly works. Coeur d'Alene examples have been taken from the works of Nicodemus et al. as well as from the COLRC website.

Coeur d'Alene Orthographies (Doak and Montler 2000 modified)
Salishan/LPO	Nicodemus/Bitar	Reichard	English examples	Coeur d'Alene examples	
Salishan/LPO	Nicodemus/Bitar	Reichard	English examples	Nicodemus	Translation
a	a	a	father	ansh	angel
e	e	ä, ê	yes	esel	two
I	i	i	machine	hsil	five
o	o	ɔ	law	hoy	Quit it!
u	u	u	Jupiter	upen	ten
ə	no form	ᴇ,ι, ụ	sofa		
p	p	p	spill	pipe’	father
pʼ	pʼ	pʼ		sp’it’m	bitterroot
b	b	b	boy	bins	beans
m	m	m	mom	mus	four
mʼ	ʼm	mʼ			
w	w	w	wagon	wi’	he/she shouted
wʼ	ʼw	wʼ		s'wa’	cougar
t	t	t	star	sti’m	what
tʼ	tʼ	tʼ		t'ish	sugar
d	d	d	dog	tmidus	tomatoes
n	n	n	now	nune'	mother
nʼ	ʼn	nʼ		'nitshn	hotel
s	s	s	sun	sikwe’	water
c	ts	ts	tsitsi fly	tsunchtm	seven
cʼ	tsʼ	ts’		ts’or	salt/sour
š	sh	c	shell	shenn	he/she worked
ǰ	j	dj	jar	lejp	he/she was stabbed
č	ch	tc	church	chche’ye’	mother’s mother
čʼ	ch’	tc’			
y	y	y	yard	speyiy	enjoyment
yʼ	ʼy	yʼ		'yitsh	sleeping [Noun]
ɡʷ	ɡw, ɡu	ɡw, ɡu	linguist	Gwich	he/she saw
kʷ	kw, k, ku, ko	kʷ, ku	queen	skwitstm	morning
kʼʷ	kʼw, kʼu, kʼo	kʼʷ, kʼu, kʼụ			
xʷ	khw, khu, kho	xʷ, xu		*tsetkhw	house
q	q	q		qine’	father’s mother
q’	q’	q’			
qʷ	qw, qu, qo	qʷ		‘oqws	she/she drank
qʼʷ	q’w, qʼu, qʼo	qʼʷ, qʼu		*sq’wtu	Cataldo
x̣	qh	x̣			
x̣ʷ	qhw, qhu, qho	x̣ʷ		*qhwatqhwat	duck
l	l	l	like	lut	no/not
lʼ	ʼl	lʼ			
ɬ	ł	ł			
r	r	r	far	Sharshart	difficult
rʼ	ʼr	rʼ			
ʕ	(, )	R		st(in	antelope
ʕʼ	ʼ(, ʼ)	Rʼ		'(ewp	it dripped
ʕʷ	(w, (u	rʷ		(wi(lsh	he/she vomited
ʕʼʷ	ʼ(w, uʼ(	ṛʼʷ			
ʔ	ʼ	ʼ	uh-uh	tso'ot	he/she sobbed
h	h	h	hen	hiskwist	my name

Notes on writing systems

1. LPO, the linguistic phonetic orthography, is a third orthographic system based on a variant of the American Phonetic Alphabet (with some symbols shared with the International Phonetic Alphabet (IPA)). Many Salishan scholars, such as Lyon Greenwood, call the LPO orthography the Salishan orthography. This system will also be used by the Coeur d'Alene Dictionaries Project in conjunction with the Bitar system.
2. Bitar is another name referring to Lawrence Nicodemus's orthography. Lawrence Nicodemus was one of Gladys Reichard's language consultants, and in collaboration with Joseph Bitar of the Southwest Research Associates of Albuquerque, he created a second orthography, which is less accurate phonetically but reflects the native speaker's interpretation of the sounds, symbols, and words of Coeur d'Alene.
3. Gladys Reichard and James Teit, students of Franz Boas. Reichard conducted early scholarly work of the Coeur d'Alene. Reichard and Teit developed an orthographic system, slightly varied from the Boasian system, which was consistent with phonetic transcriptions of native speakers Reichard worked with as well as consistent with transcriptions from Teit's previous data. This system has come to be known as the Reichard orthography.
4. In Doak and Montler, ⟨e⟩ is used in the LPO orthography, equated with /ɛ/. Doak explains that /ɛ/ ranges freely between [e], [ɛ], and [æ] with /ɛ/ being the most common variant. This gives clarity to her variance in representing the sound in vowel inventories of her website and her dissertation as /e/ or /ɛ/.
5. Doak and Montler, Doak, and Doak use the notation ⟨x̣⟩ while Lyon uses ⟨x̌⟩ to indicate the same phoneme and orthographic symbol. Okanagan also utilizes the wedge notation for this same phoneme: ⟨x̌⟩.
6. Standard Salishan (LPO) and Doak uses the notation ⟨ɬ⟩ while Lyon, and Greenwood, Nicodemus et al., and Reichard used the notation ⟨ł⟩ in consonant inventories and orthographies in reference to the same sound which Doak describes as bilateral.

== Morphology and syntax ==
Coeur d'Alene is a morphosyntactically polysynthetic language. In Coeur d'Alene, a full clause can be expressed by affixing pronominal arguments and morphemes expressing aspect, transitivity and tense onto one verb stem (Doak, 1997, p. 38). These affixes are discussed below.

=== Basic intransitive clause structure ===
The basic format of an intransitive thought as Doak identifies can be found below:

Subject – Aspect – Root

=== Intransitive person markers ===
The intransitive subjects of Coeur d'Alene appear as clitics (Doak, 1997, p. 53), and their forms as well as examples from Doak (1997, p. 53-54) are found below:

Intransitive Subject Clitics
	Singular	Plural
1st Person Nom.	čn	č
2nd Person Nom.	kʷu	kʷup
3rd Person Abs.	Ø (null)	Ø (null) (-ilš)

Example
	Singular	Plural
1st person	čngʷič ‘I saw.’	čgʷič ‘We saw.’
2nd person	kʷugʷič ‘You saw.’	kʷupgʷič ‘You folks saw.’
3rd person	gʷič ‘He saw.’	gʷič(ilš) ‘They saw.’

=== Plural –ilš ===
The parentheses used around the suffix -ilš are meant to show that it is optional. This third person plural, optional morpheme is used to give clarity that something within the sentence has plurality, whether it is the subject or the object is a matter of context. To illustrate this more clearly, Doak (1997, p. 59) gives the example:

ʔacqɛʔ -m -st(u) -Ø -s -ilš
go.out -m -CAUS.TR -3.ABS -3.ERG -PL
‘He took them out.’/ ‘They took it out.’ / ‘They took them out.’

=== Determiners ===
There are three determiners and one oblique marker that help specify participants by joining clauses and their main predicates. Doak (1997, p. 46-48).

Det	label	example
xʷε	det₁	examples 2,3,4
cε	det₂	example 4
ɬε	det₃	example 1
ʔε	oblique	example 3

As a general rule, adjuncts that are introduced with a determiner specify the absolutive, accusative and nominative pronominal arguments, while both the determiner and oblique marker introduce ergative arguments. When an indefinite participant is not indicated on the predicate, the oblique alone is used to indicate this participant. — Doak (1997, p. vii)

Examples:

ɬuʔ niʔt̓εk̓ʷus ɬa stqʷíl̇k̇ʷup
prox₃ lay.in.fire det₃ fire
He lay in the fire.

ni kʷup ʔáccqεʔ xʷε Lynn hiɬ kʷu ʔε
Q you.folks go.out.PL det₁ Lynn CONN you person
Did you go out with Lynn?

xεmínčs xʷε čεsčšípnc xʷε ʔε sčíčεʔ
he.likes det₁ he.will.chase.it det₁ OBL horse
The horse likes to chase.

xʷε ʔε núnεʔs hiɬ cε pípεʔs…
det₁ OBL their.mother and det₂ their.father…
Their mother and their father ...

=== Basic transitive clause structure ===
The construction of a transitive sentence in Coeur d'Alene is:

Aspect – Root – Transitivizer – Object – Subject

=== Transitivizers ===
There are three types of transitives in Coeur d'Alene: simple, causative, and applicative. The different transitivizers in Coeur d'Alene are listed below as described by Bischoff (2011, p. 27 modified).

	Transitivizing Morphemes
Simple	-t
Simple	-nt
Causative	-st(u)
Applicative	-łt
Applicative	-tułt
Applicative	-š(i)t

==== The lone -t and directive -nt transitivizers ====
The lone -t (-t) and the directive transitivizer -nt (-dt) are the most commonly used in Coeur d'Alene (Bischoff, 2011, p. 27). Doak (1997, p. 115) suggests that these two are alternative forms of one another with the lone -t appearing before a limited number of roots. The person markers that follow these forms are the same in function and form: agent subjects and patient objects. Most often, these transitivizers indicate that the subject is an agent in control of his or her actions (Bischoff, 2011, p. 27).

√t'áp -nt -sɛ -s
√shoot -DIR.TR -1.ACC -3.ERG
He shot me.' (Doak, 1997, p. 114)

√číł -t -Ø -m
√give -TR -3.ABS -NTE
'He was given it.' (Bischoff, 2011, p. 28)

==== Causative transitivizer -st(u) ====
The causative transitivizer -st(u) (-ct) has three primary functions. It is used to indicate customary aspect, causative construction where the subject causes something or someone to be something, and topical object construction (Doak, 1997, p. 124). A unique set of m-initial objects for first and second person singular replace the s-initial morphemes when the construction is with a causative -st(u) transitivizer (Bischoff, 2011, p. 29).

ʔɛc- √ɡʷíč -st(u) -mi -t
cust- √see -CAUS.TR -2.ACC -1PL.ERG
'We see you.' (Doak, 1997, p. 126)

čic- √xʷuy -st(u) -mɛ(l) -s
DIR- √go -CAUS.TR -1.ACC -3.ERG
'He took me there.' (Doak, 1997, p. 125-126)

==== Applicative transitivizers ====
Applicative transitivizers introduce a third participant into the argument structure, and alter the role of the object. This means the participant represented by the object person marking morpheme serves as a possessor or dative with the possessor applicative transitivizer -łt (-pra) and as a beneficiary or dative with the benefactive transitivizer -š(i)t (-bt). There is also a third, much less frequent, applicative -tułt. can also indicate a dative construction, indicating the object to which something is given. It is also worthwhile to note that third person arguments are only understood from context because Coeur d'Alene only marks two arguments on the predicate using person marking morphemes (Bischoff, 2011, p. 30).

==== Possessor applicative transitivizer -łt ====
In transitive constructions with the possessor applicative -łt (-pra), the object marking on the predicate indicates the possessor, rather than the possessed, such as in Examples 1a and 1b below. In some cases, as in Example 1c below, -łt (-pra) serves to indicate a dative construction. In these cases, the role of the object shifts to dative (Bischoff, 2011, p. 30-31).

√q'ʷíc’ -łt -si -n
√fill -POSS.APL.TR -2.ACC -1.ERG
'I filled it for you.' (Doak, 1997, p. 144)

√cúnmɛʔ -łt -si -n
√teach -POSS.APL.TR -2.ACC -1.ERG
'I showed you how it's done.' (Doak, 1997, p. 150)

kʼʷnɛʔ √cunmɛy+CVC -łt -ɛlis -s
soon {√teach+REDUP_{<aug>}} -POSS.APL.TR -1PL.ACC -3.ERG
'He will show us [how to do it].' ('He will teach 'x' to us.') (Bischoff, 2011, p. 31; Doak, 1997, p. 149)

==== Benefactive applicative transitivizer -š(i)t ====
In constructions with the benefactive applicative -š(i)t (-bt), the argument indicated by the ergative is agent and that by accusative/absolutive the beneficiary. The benefactive applicative may also function to characterize an object as a recipient (Bischoff, 2011, p. 31).

√nkʷín -šit -si -n
√sing -BEN.APL.TR -2.ACC -1.ERG
'I sang to you.' (Doak, 1997, p. 156)

==== Dative applicative transitivizer -tułt ====
The dative applicative -tułt is very rare, and the role of this applicative is uncertain other than that it introduces another participant into a sentence structure (Doak, 1997, p. 157). The only examples Doak gives only occur with third person or non-topic ergative person marking morphemes (Bischoff, 2011, p. 32).

√tám -tułt -Ø -s
√scorch -DAT.APL.TR -3.ABS -3.ERG
'He burned it for somebody.' (Doak, 1997, p. 159)

=== Transitive person markers ===
==== Transitive objects ====
Below are the transitive object morphemes, which appear as suffixes. The 3rd person is null.

Transitive Objects
	Singular	Plural
1st Person Acc.	-sɛ(l)/-mɛ(l)	-ɛl(i)
2nd Person Acc.	-si/-mi	-ulm(i)
3rd Person Abs.	Ø (null)	Ø (null) (-ilš)

Notes on Transitive Objects

1. The alternate forms of the 1st person singular accusative -sɛl/-mɛl and 2nd person singular accusative -si/-mi are selected with respect to the transitivizer used in the predicate, those occurring with m primarily occur with the causative transitivizer -st(u)- while all other transitivizers take those with s form. (Bischoff, 2011, p. 16)
2. The /l/ in parentheses indicates optionality in phonetic articulation, due to phonological reductions. The phoneme /l/ appears as in examples 1a and 1b before the non-topic ergative object -m and with the 2nd person plural ergative subject -p.

The following examples are taken from Doak (1997, p. 55-64).

√c’uw’ -nt -sɛl -m
√hit -DIR.TR -1.ACC -NTE
'I got hit.'

√pulut -st(u) -mɛl -m
√kill -CAUS.TR -1.ACC -NTE
'I got killed.'

√čił -šit -ɛli -t
√give -bt -1PL.ACC -NTE
'We were given some.'

√c’uw’ -nt -si -s
√hit -DIR.TR -2.ACC -3erg
'He hit you.'

√pulut -st(u) -mi -t
√kill -CAUS.TR -2.ACC -NTE
'You got killed.'

√mɛy’+CVC -šit -ulmi -t
√know+{CVC} -bt -2PL.ACC -NTE
'You folks were told stories.'

√mɛy’+CVC -šit -Ø -mɛt
√know+{CVC} -bt -3.ABS -1PL.ERG
'We told him stories.'

√čiɬ -šit -Ø -m -ilš
√give -bt -3.ABS -NTE -3PL
'They were given some.'

==== Non-topic ergative objects ====
There is also a second set of transitive objects in Coeur d'Alene also appear as suffixes, which Doak identifies as non-topic ergative objects (NTE).

Non-Topic Ergative Objects
	Singular	Plural
1st NTE	-m	-t
2nd NTE	-t	-t
3rd NTE	-m	-m (-ilš)

Following examples from Doak (1997, p. 57-63):

√pulut -st(u) -mɛl -m
√kill -CAUS.TR -1.ACC -NTE
'I got killed.'

√čiɬ -šit -ɛli -t
√give -bt -1PL.ACC -NTE
'We were given some.'

√pulut -st(u) -mi -t
√kill -CAUS.TR -2.ACC -NTE
'You got killed.'

√cun √mey -nt -ɛli -t
√point √know -DIR.TR -2PL.ACC -NTE
'We were taught.'

n √tiʔ=ɛɬniw’ -nt -Ø -m
LOC √hit=side -DIR.TR -3.ABS -NTE
'He got hit on the side.'

√čiɬ -šit -Ø -m -ilš
√give -bt -3.ABS -NTE -3PL
'They were given some.'

==== Ergative transitive subjects ====
The transitive subjects of Ergative case also appear as suffixes in Coeur d'Alene.

Ergative Transitive Subjects
	Singular	Plural
1st Person Erg.	-n	-(mɛ)t
2nd Person Erg.	-xʷ	-p
3rd Person Erg.	-s	-s (-ilš)
NTE	-m/-t	-t/-m

Examples from Doak (1997, p. 56-63) are given below.

√t’ap -nt -Ø -n
√shoot -DIR.TR -3.ABS -1.ERG
'I shot him.'

√maqʷ -nt -Ø -mɛt
√stack -DIR.TR -3.ABS -1PL.ERG
'We piled up rocks, sacks of wheat.'

√q’ʷic’ -ɬt -sɛl -xʷ
√fill -POSS.APL.TR -1.ACC -2.ERG
'You filled it for me.'

√q’ʷic’ -ɬt -sɛl -p
√fill -POSS.APL.TR -1.ACC -2PL.ERG
'You folks filled it for me.'

√c’uw’ -nt -si -s
√hit -DIR.TR -2acc -3.ERG
'He hit you.'

√ʔacqɛʔ -m -st(u) -Ø -s -ilš
√go.out -m -CAUS.TR -3.ABS -3.ERG -PL
'He took them out.'/ 'They took it out.' / 'They took them out.'

==== Genitive pronouns ====
Genitive structures are used to create possessives in Coeur d'Alene (Doak 1997, p. 169).

Genitive Pronouns
	Singular	Plural
1st Person Gen.	hn-	-ɛt
2nd Person Gen.	in-	-mp
3rd Person Gen.	-s	-s (-ilš)

Examples below are taken from Doak (1997, p. 69-71).

hn- stiʔ
1.GEN- thing
'It's mine.'

cɛtxʷ -ɛt
house -1PL.GEN
'It's our house.'

in- stiʔ
2.GEN- thing
'It's yours.'

cɛtxʷ -mp
house -2PL.GEN
'It's your (pl.) house.'

stiʔ -s
thing -3.GEN
'It's his/hers.'

stiʔ -s -ilš
thing -3.GEN -3PL
'It's theirs.'

==== Predicate Pronominals ====
Predicate Pronominal forms may stand alone as predicates or may serve as emphatic adjuncts. The forms are constructed as intransitive predicates with morphology and unanalyzable roots used nowhere else, and examples are given below (Doak, 1997, p. 72-73).

Predicate Pronominals
	Singular	Plural
1st person	čn ʔɛngʷt	č lípust
2nd person	kʷu ʔɛngʷt	kʷup lípust
3rd person	cɛnil	cənílilš

=== Aspect ===
There are three aspects in Coeur d'Alene. The first is the completive, which has no morpheme marker. The completive aspect refers to an action that was completed in the past (Bischoff, 2011, p. 22; Reichard, 1938, p. 574).

čn- Ø- √mílxʷ
1.NOM- COMP- √smoke
'I smoked.' (Doak, 1997, p. 83)

The second is the customary aspect, characterized by the prefix morpheme, ʔɛc- (Doak, 1997, p. 85).

č- ʔɛc- √kʼʷúl
1PL.NOM- CUS- √work
'We work.' (Doak, 1997, p. 85)

The third aspect is the continuative, indicated by the prefix morpheme y’c-.

čn- y’c- √ɡʷíč
1.NOM CONT- √see
'I am seeing.' (Doak 1997, p. 106)

=== Tense ===
In addition to aspect in Coeur d'Alene, there is evidence of realis and irrealis. Realis and irrealis marks a distinction between time that the speaker can directly perceive through his or her own knowledge or senses (realis) and that which is conjectured known of hypothetically, distantly, or by hearsay (irrealis). Only examples of irrealis are attested in Coeur d'Alene (Doak 1997, p. 188).

Irrealis is indicated in the same way as an aspect marker, by a particle occurring before the verb. The irrealis particle is nεʔ. There are no examples of both an aspect marker and irrealis occurring in the same predicate (Doak 1997, p. 189).

nεʔ uɬ-čic √ʔεĺ+C₂ xʷε in √nunεʔ
IRR again-LOC √move+NCR det₁ 2.GEN √mother
"When your mom gets back ..." (Doak 1997, p. 188)

nεʔ √ʔεkʷun-stu-ø-mεt xʷε √q̀ʷεd=alqs
IRR √say-CAUS.TR-3.ABS-1PL.ERG det √black=clothes
"We'll tell the black robes" [or monks] (Doak 1997, p. 189.)
