= Mildred Bailey =

Native American jazz singer (1907–1951)

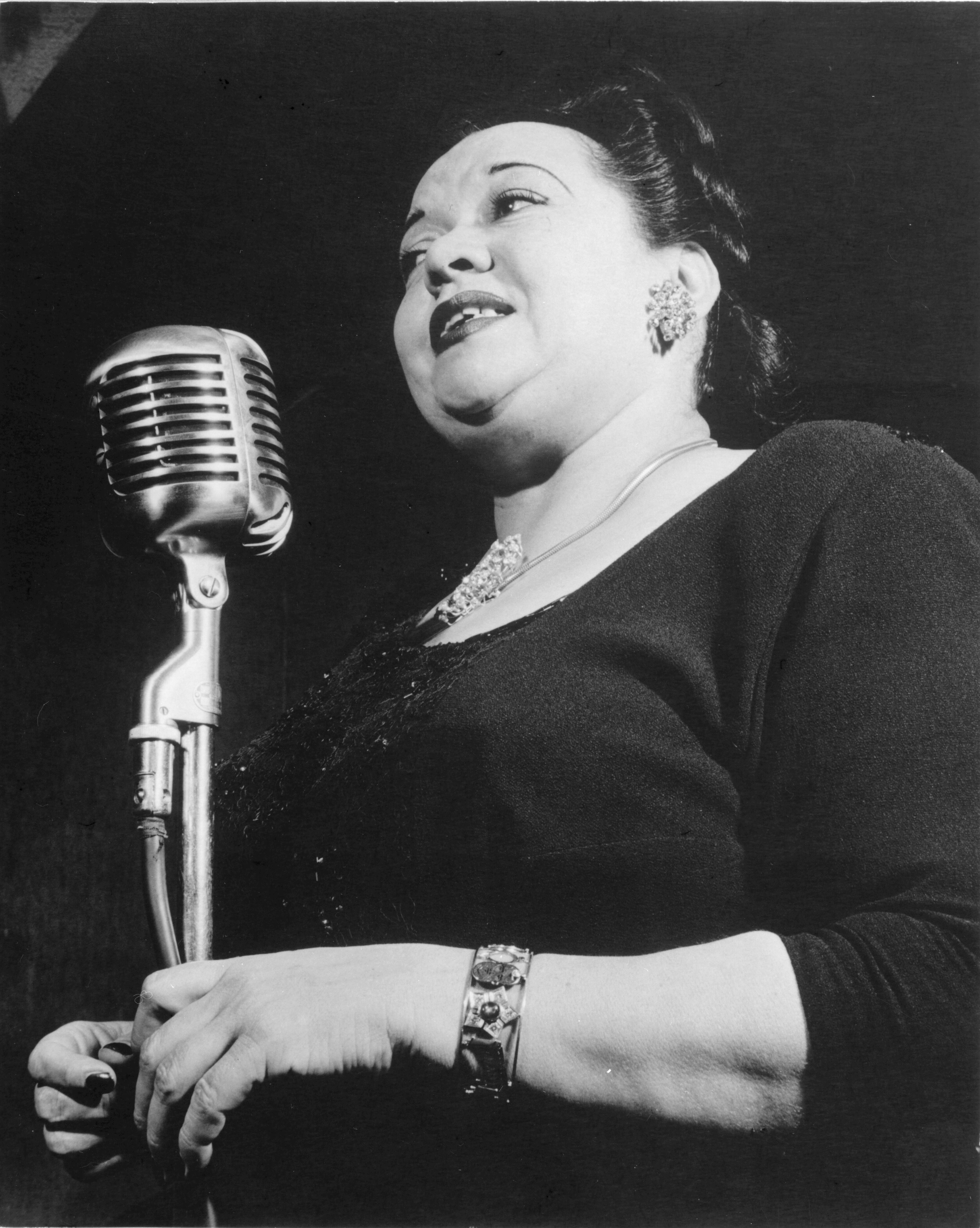
- Bailey photographed by William P. Gottlieb in New York City, 1947

Background information
- Born: Mildred Eleanor Rinker; February 27, 1907; Tekoa, Washington, U.S.
- Died: December 12, 1951 (aged 44) Poughkeepsie, New York, U.S.
- Genres: Jazz, vocal jazz, blues
- Occupation: Singer
- Label: Vocalion
- Spouse: Red Norvo (m. 1933; div. 1942)

Mildred Bailey (born Mildred Rinker; February 27, 1907 – December 12, 1951) was an American jazz singer during the 1930s and 1940s, known as "The Queen of Swing", "The Rockin' Chair Lady", and "Mrs. Swing".

She recorded the songs "For Sentimental Reasons," "Georgia on my Mind," "St. Louis Blues," "It's So Peaceful in the Country," "Doin' The Uptown Lowdown," "Trust in Me," "Where Are You?," "I Let a Song Go Out of My Heart," "Small Fry," "Please Be Kind," "Darn That Dream," "Rockin' Chair," "Blame It on My Last Affair," and "Says My Heart." She had three records that reached number one on the popular charts.

Bailey grew up on the Coeur d'Alene Reservation in Idaho, where her mother was an enrolled citizen. The family moved to Spokane, Washington, when she was 13. Her younger brothers also became musicians. Her brother, Al Rinker, sang with Bing Crosby in Spokane and became a member of The Rhythm Boys. As adults, Charles Rinker was a lyricist, and Miles Rinker was a clarinet and saxophone player who later became a booking agent.

== Early life ==
Bailey was born Mildred Rinker on a farm in rural Tekoa, Washington. Her mother Josephine was a citizen of the Coeur d'Alene Tribe and a devout Roman Catholic. Bailey's great-grandfather, Bazil Peone, was a head speaker and song leader of the Coeur d'Alene at the turn of the 20th century. His ability to create indigenized Catholic hymns helped guide the tribe during difficult times of active colonization by Jesuit missionaries.

Bailey and her siblings grew up near De Smet, Idaho, on the Coeur d'Alene Reservation. Her father played fiddle and called square dances. Her mother played piano every evening and taught her to play and sing. Her younger brothers included Miles, Al, a vocalist and composer, and Charles, a lyricist. The family often hosted Saturday night gatherings, creating small music and dance hall in the home for local ranchers with both Josephine and Mildred at the piano. Mildred also accompanied her mother to traditional native ceremonies, where she heard and practiced the traditional songs and lyrics that would later influence her unique singing voice.

Josephine died from tuberculosis at the age of 36, threatening Mildred's ability to remain connected to her native family and traditions in a way that she was able to while her mother was alive. Soon after Josephine's death, Mildred's father remarried, bringing a daughter and creating a tumultuous and unhappy house from which Mildred and her siblings were systematically pushed out by her new stepmother. Given an ultimatum to choose his own children or his new wife, Mildred's father sided with his wife and Mildred moved out of the home and in with her aunt and uncle in Seattle. She and her aunt were involved in a serious car accident a short time later which killed her aunt and left Mildred with serious physical and emotional scars.

== Music career ==
At age 17, Rinker moved to Seattle and worked as a sheet music demonstrator at Woolworth's. She married and divorced Ted Bailey, keeping his last name because she thought it sounded more American than Rinker, which was of Swiss (German) origin.

She toured with a West Coast revue and finished in California where she obtained work at radio station KMTR and at a speakeasy in Bakersfield called The Swede's. With the help of her second husband Benny Stafford, Bailey became an established blues and jazz singer on the west coast of the United States. According to Gary Giddins in his book Bing Crosby: A Pocketful of Dreams, The Early Years 1903–1940, she found work for her brother Al Rinker and Bing Crosby, who had started performing in Spokane, Washington. They had traveled from Spokane to join her in Los Angeles. Giddins says Crosby heard about Louis Armstrong from Bailey, who urged him to hear Armstrong if Crosby was to be a serious jazz singer. She also played Crosby records from her collection by Ethel Waters and Bessie Smith.

Crosby helped Bailey in turn by introducing her to Paul Whiteman in Los Angeles. She sang with Whiteman's band from 1929 to 1933. Whiteman had a radio program for Old Gold Cigarettes, and when Bailey debuted on it with her version of "Moanin' Low" on August 6, 1929, favorable public reaction was immediate. However, Bailey's first recording with Whiteman did not take place until October 6, 1931, when she recorded a song called "My Goodbye to You". Her recording of "All of Me" with Whiteman the same year was a hit in 1932.

Her first two records had been as an uncredited vocalist for a 1929 session by the Eddie Lang Orchestra ("What Kind o' Man Is You?", a Hoagy Carmichael song that was issued only in the UK), and a recording on May 8, 1930, of "I Like to Do Things for You" for Frankie Trumbauer. She was Whiteman's female vocalist through 1932 (recording in a smooth, crooning style) but left the band later that same year over salary disagreements. She recorded four sides for Brunswick in 1931 with the Casa Loma Orchestra. and there were further recordings for the label in 1933 with the Dorsey Brothers as supporting musicians. Bailey was part of an all-star session with Benny Goodman's studio band in 1934 featuring Coleman Hawkins, Dick McDonough, and Gene Krupa. After leaving Whiteman, Bailey sang on the radio shows of George Jessel and Willard Robison.

In 1933, Bailey married Red Norvo, a xylophonist, improviser, and band leader who had also worked with Paul Whiteman. A dynamic couple, they remained married until 1942 and were known as "Mr. and Mrs. Swing". They worked much of the time in New York City. They remained friends after their divorce. She worked as a solo act, singing in clubs in New York, such as the Café Society and the Blue Angel. From September 1944, Bailey's radio show began on CBS and continued until February 1945. Her last major engagement was with Joe Marsala in Chicago in 1950.

From 1936 to 1939, Norvo recorded for Brunswick (with Bailey as primary vocalist), and Bailey recorded for Vocalion, often with Norvo's band. Some of her other recordings featured members of Count Basie's band. The two performers continued to record together intermittently until 1945. Bailey was featured on Benny Goodman's Camel Caravan radio program and sang on a number of Goodman's Columbia recordings in 1939 and 1940, including her version of "Darn That Dream" which was a hit in 1940.

Bailey suffered from diabetes. Due to her health, she was hospitalized in 1938, 1943, and 1949. She went into retirement for a time in 1949 on a farm she owned in Poughkeepsie, New York. Often in financial difficulties, she was bailed out several times by Bing Crosby.

Bailey died of heart failure on December 12, 1951 in St. Francis Hospital in Poughkeepsie, New York at the age of 44.

== Awards and honors ==
- In 1989, Bailey was inducted into the Big Band and Jazz Hall of Fame.
- The New Grove Dictionary of Jazz describes Bailey as "the first white singer to absorb and master the jazz-flavored phrasing...of her black contemporaries." However, this designation fails to recognize Bailey's full heritage, as her mother was "a Coeur d’Alene tribal member," and "her father of Swiss-Irish stock."
- In 1994, a 29-cent stamp was issued by the US Postal Service in Bailey's honor; it was designed by Howard Koslow, based on the photograph by jazz photographer William Gottlieb (at the head of this article) of Bailey performing at Carnegie Hall.
- In 2012, the Coeur d'Alene Nation introduced a resolution honoring Bailey to the Idaho state legislature. They were seeking acknowledgement of the singer's Coeur d'Alene ancestry as well as to promote her induction to the Jazz at Lincoln Center Hall of Fame in New York City.

== Number one hits ==
In 1938, Bailey had two number one hits with Red Norvo and His Orchestra. "Please Be Kind" reached number one on the Hit Parade chart on May 7. She also sang lead vocals with Norvo on "Says My Heart", which reached number one during the week of June 18, 1938.

Bailey sang lead vocals on "Darn That Dream", recorded by Benny Goodman and His Orchestra, which reached number one for one week in March 1940 on the U.S. pop chart.

== Discography ==
- Big City Blues (Regent, 1957)
- Sweet Beginnings (The Old Masters, 1994)
- Band Vocalist (The Old Masters, 1994)
- The Rockin' Chair Lady (GRP, 1994)
- The Blue Angel Years (Baldwin Street Music, 1999)
- Me and the Blues (Savoy, 2000)
- The Legendary V-Disc Sessions (Vintage Jazz, 1990)
- The Complete Columbia Recordings of Mildred Bailey (Mosaic, 2000)

=== Hit singles ===
(Vocalion releases only)

Year	Single	US	Cat. No.
1936	"For Sentimental Reasons"	18	3367
1936	"More Than You Know"	15	3378
1937	"Trust in Me" (A-side)	4	3449
1937	"My Last Affair" (B-side)	10	3449
1937	"Where Are You?"	5	3456
1937	"Never in a Million Years"	8	3508
1937	"Rockin' Chair"	13	3553
1937	"It's the Natural Thing to Do"	14	3626
1937	"Bob White (Whatcha Gonna Swing Tonight?)"	14	3712
1937	"Right or Wrong"	19	3758
1938	"Thanks for the Memory"	11	3931
1938	"Don't Be That Way"	9	4016
1938	"I Let a Song Go Out of My Heart"	8	4083
1938	"Small Fry"	9	4224
1938	"So Help Me"	2	4253
1938	"My Reverie"	10	4408
1939	"Blame It on My Last Affair"	13	4632
1939	"Moon Love"	14	4939

=== Other notable recordings ===
- "Georgia on My Mind" (1931)
- "I'll Never Be the Same" (1932)
- "Lazy Bones" (1933)
- "Heat Wave" (1933)
- "Ol' Pappy" (1934)
- "Miss Brown to you" (Sideman Teddy Wilson) (1935)
- "I'd Love to Take Orders from You" (1935)
- "Someday, Sweetheart" (1935)
- "When Day Is Done" (1935)
- "Honeysuckle Rose" (1935)
- "Squeeze Me" (1935)
- "A Porter's Love Song to a Chambermaid" (1936)
- "'Long About Midnight" (1936)
- "It Can Happen to You" (1936)
- "I've Got My Love to Keep Me Warm" (1937)
- "Slumming on Park Avenue" (1937)
- "Worried Over You" (1937)
- "Love Is Here to Stay" (1938)
- "Please Be Kind" (1938)
- "Weekend of a Private Secretary" (1938)
- "Says My Heart" (1938)
- "Garden of the Moon" (1938)
- "Have You Forgotten So Soon?" (1938)
- "Born to Swing" (1938)
- "I Go for That" (1939)
- "Love's a Necessary Thing" (1939)
- "I'm Glad There Is You" (1939)
- "I Don't Stand a Ghost of a Chance with You" (1939)
- "The Lamp Is Low" (1939)
- "I Thought About You" (1939)
- "Bluebirds in the Moonlight" (1939)
- "Darn That Dream" (1939)
- "Don't Take Your Love from Me" (1940)
- "It's So Peaceful in the Country" (1940)
- "Wham (Re Bop Boom Bam) (1940)
- "In Love in Vain" (1946)
- "It's a Woman's Prerogative" (1946)
- "Almost Like Being in Love" (1947)

The 2023 American historical drama miniseries "Lessons in Chemistry" used Bailey's 1940 recording of "Wham (Re Bop Boom Bam)" as its opening theme song.

"Portobello", a track from the Caravan Palace 2024 electro swing album "Gangbusters Melody Club", features a sample from Bailey's recording of "When that Man is Dead and Gone".
