= Mary Immaculate School for Native Americans =

School in Idaho

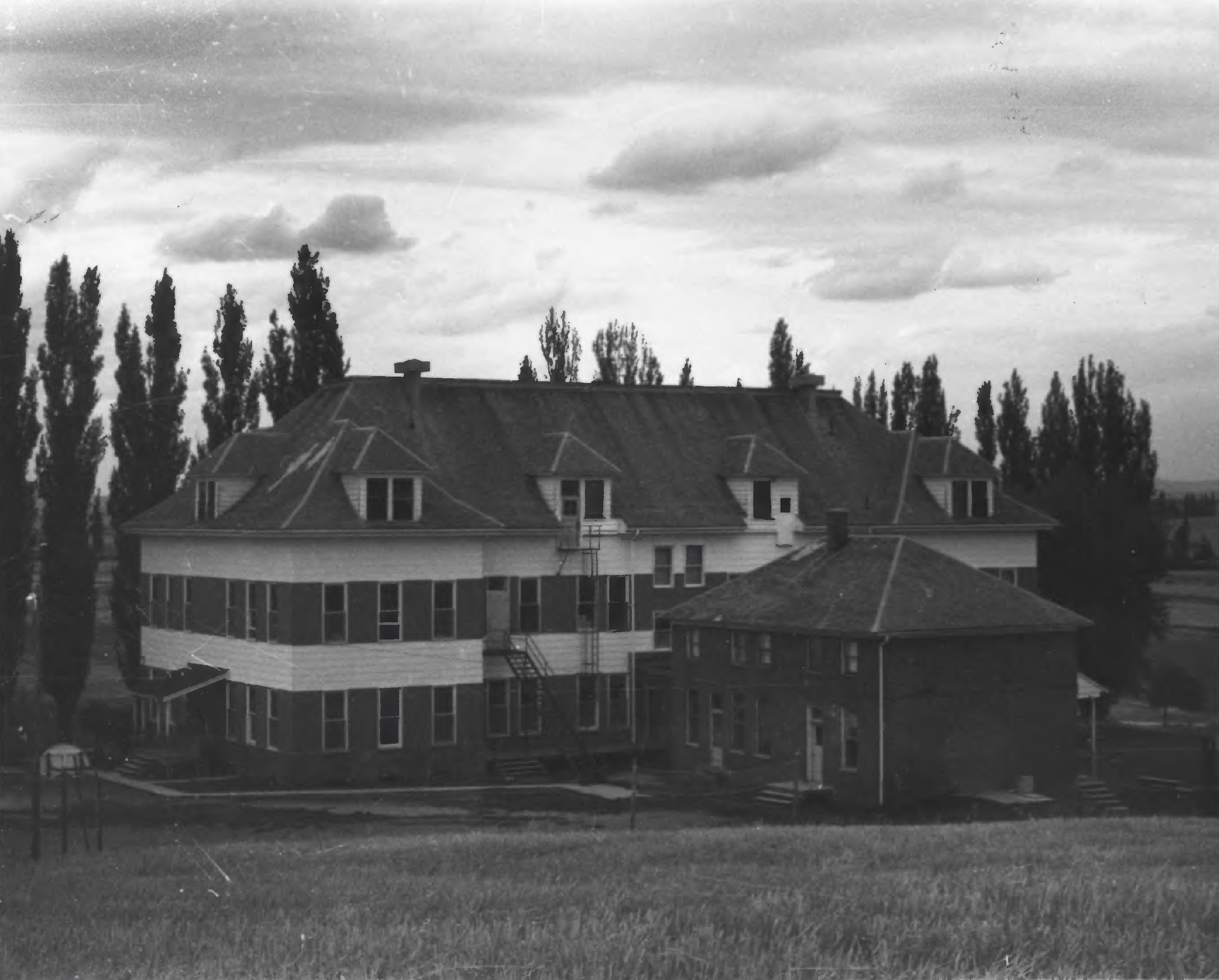
The historic Mary Immaculate School for Native Americans in De Smet, Idaho. The building was burned in 2011.

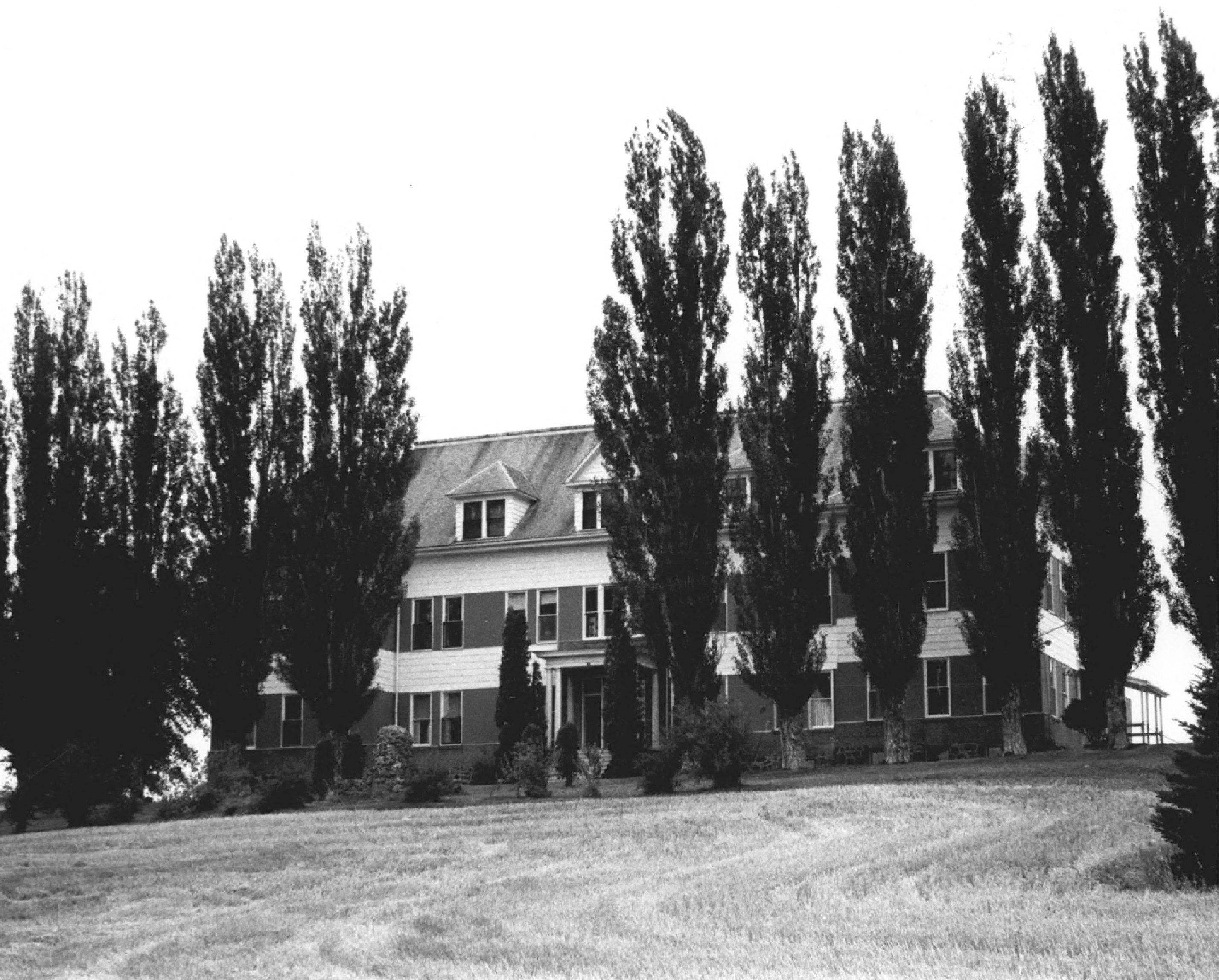

The Mary Immaculate School for Native Americans was constructed in June 1908 for educating children of the Coeur d’Alene tribe in the Sacred Heart Mission in Desmet, Idaho. The school was run by the Catholic nuns of the mission as an Indian boarding school to educate and civilize its pupils. It was eventually closed as a school in 1974 and the title of the building was transferred from the Sisters of Charity of Providence to the Coeur d’Alene tribe. It was used as the location for the tribe's education department, the cutting and sewing industry, and a historical interpretive center. The building was added to the National Historic Register in 1975. In 2011 the building was destroyed in a fire while being used for storage and telecommunications.

== Arrival of Jesuit Missionaries ==
The first of the Jesuit missionaries arrived in the Bitterroot Valley on a wagon train in September 1841 under Father Peter John De Smet, a Belgian priest appointed over the missionary efforts in the Rocky Mountains. These missionaries first established relations with the neighboring tribes to the Coeur d’Alenes. The Coeur d’Alene, or the Schetsu’umsh Indians (Coeur d'Alene was given by the French, meaning “Heart of an Awl”), welcomed the missionaries. In 1740 one of the tribe's greatest chiefs, Circling Raven, told his people of a vision he had of men in black robes with crossed sticks that would come to teach the Schetsu'umsh new knowledge and new medicine. When the Jesuit missionaries came to the Bitterroot Valley a hundred years later, the Coeur d'Alene Indians received them as the men in black robes that Circling Raven prophesied about. Christianity was then integrated into their culture by the missionaries.

Father De Smet created a mission plan for the building of Catholicism in the area around 1842, called the “Plan du Village de Coeur’s-d’alenes”. His methods for this conversion process were based on the results of Jesuit missionaries in Paraguay, which included isolation of the native peoples from other tribes and outsiders and increasing the potential for agrarian self-sufficiency.

Father Nicholas Point and Brother Charles Huet joined Father De Smet and christened the Coeur d’Alene Valley on the first Friday of November in 1842, which is considered to be a Catholic Day of Devotion. The Jesuit records indicate that according to Father Point, the conversion rate of the Coeur d’Alene Indians was 100%, though his report is considered to be exaggerated. With the progression of Catholicism and the adoption of many of its practices, the records indicate that the religion was not totally or completely accepted in practice or among tribal members. The tribe at first accepted the teachings and practices of the Jesuit missionaries if they added to their current culture without replacing it. Over time, the dynamic of dual culture shifted in favor of Catholicism. The tribe, which once supported polygamy and fluid marriage contracts, gambling, religious practices with medicine bundles, and sacred ceremonies now enforced the Christian model of marriage with rigid contracts and subdued or quiet ceremonial and religious practices. They were introduced to the principles of agriculture.

In 1848 Anthony Ravalli introduced plans for a large Roman Doric Church to be constructed in the valley. The responsibility for the cost and construction of the church would fall on the Native Americans, who would be meagerly compensated in small meals by the Sacred Heart Mission.

== Boarding school for Native Americans ==
During the late 19th century and into the 20th century, the number of Native American boarding schools began to increase throughout the whole United States but specifically in the west. They were integrated as part of the cultural assimilation of the Native American tribes into Western society. These schools have raised controversy over their typically harsh and strict conditions. Indian students had their hair cut upon arrival, were often only allowed to speak English, and dressed according to American styles of clothing.

Mary Immaculate School for Native Americans was a boarding school for Indian girls. Students there learned a variety of academic subjects, including the arts. Along with academic pursuits, they practiced life skills such as cooking, sewing, and gardening. Students at the school were assimilated into American culture, though the Catholic nuns were beloved by their students and the tribe. Some students and their families viewed the school as an opportunity to amidst the dominating white influence. Girls received their First Communion and were confirmed according to the Catholic faith. The school was well-loved by many students, who praised the nuns for their efforts. Bishops and tribal chiefs would visit periodically to speak to the students or administer various religious rites.

The government considered closing the mission boarding school years later and creating a public school instead. This proposal was highly contested by those who were present in the meetings, including many of the Coeur d’Alene leaders. The Coeur d’Alene wanted to see the school continue to be run by the sisters of the mission. Following these discussions, the governmental agents dropped the public school proposal and granted the Sacred Heart mission over 1200 acres to provide the resources necessary to educate the tribal students.

The school was in active use until 1974, the building being passed from the church to the Coeur d'Alene tribe. It was then used for the tribe's education department. In 1975 the building was added to the National Historic Register. The building had been used for commercial industry, telecommunications, and as a historical interpretive center. The building was destroyed in a fire on February 8, 2011.
