= The Jailing of Cecelia Capture =

Novel by Janet Campbell Hale

- First edition book cover
- Author: Janet Campbell Hale
- Language: English
- Publisher: Random House
- Publication date: 1985
- Publication place: United States
- Media type: Print (hardback and paperback) and (e-book)
- Pages: 201 (hardback)
- ISBN: 0394543270 (first edition, hardback)

The Jailing of Cecilia Capture is a novel by Janet Campbell Hale (Coeur d'Alene/Ktunaxa/Cree, 1946–2021) that was first published on March 1, 1985, by Random House.

The noval is about a young American Indian law student who is jailed on her 30th birthday for drunk driving and held on unidentified charges. While waiting to find out why she is being held, she reflects back on her life so far. It is second of four books written by Hale.

== Plot ==
Cecelia Capture is an American Indian of mixed heritage who has been jailed on her 30th birthday. Having been arrested on drunk driving charges and being held for welfare fraud charges she hadn't known about, she goes on a journey of retrospection. Cecelia reflects on her life as a poverty-stricken child growing up in an increasingly emotionally abusive home, first on an Idaho reservation, then moving to Tacoma, Washington when she was 12 years old. She convinces her mother to leave her alcoholic father to go live with her sister when she is 13 years old. Her parents eventually reconcile, but Cecelia reaches her breaking point, leaving home at 16 and moving to San Francisco.

Cecilia meets the love of her life, who, after only three days together, ships off to Da Nang, Vietnam. He is killed shortly after. Cecilia finds out she is pregnant a few weeks after he left. She considers her life as a "welfare mother" and the struggles she had with people expecting her to fail. She goes on to a community college, then on to U.C. Berkeley where she meets her husband, Nathan. They move to Spokane, which Cecilia hates because it reminds her of her childhood. She eventually leaves to go back to Boalt Hall Law School and lives in San Francisco on her own until the narration returns to her present time in jail. So unhappy with her life, she becomes suicidal. After everything Cecelia has gone through, she finds new resolve and puts the gun away.

== Reception and awards ==
=== Reviews ===
Reviews for The Jailing of Cecelia Capture have varied. From the Los Angeles Times: "Hale refuses to give Cecelia an ounce of poetry to her soul, an ounce of real passion; she sees her as distantly as her fellow students do. Because of that, we readers regard Cecelia that way as well, and view her plight as dispassionately as an overburdened social worker might." From Magill Book Reviews: "This is the first adult novel written by Janet Campbell Hale, and in it she has skillfully constructed a poignant tale that provides a keen look into the life of a modern Native American woman. In this absorbing character study, Hale demonstrates much promise as a novelist." From Publishers Weekly: "Hale draws on her own American Indian heritage to provide the rich detail, authentic dialogue and unfurbished prose that add special drama to a convincing and memorable story." From Kirkus Reviews: "...in every thudding cadence of Hale's undistinguished prose, this novel is her litany of woe--without the supporting characterizations or contrasting textures needed to frame Cecelia's misfortune, without the narrative or psychological force needed to transform a case-history into dramatic fiction. Some sociological interest, then, but little literary/storytelling impact."

=== Awards ===
Although some initial reviews were quite cutting, The Jailing of Cecelia Capture not only won first runner-up for Great Lakes Association College Book Award and for Western Writers of America Award, but in 1985 was nominated for a Pulitzer Prize.
