= Charles Rinker =

American lyricist

Charles Rinker (January 14, 1911 – December 28, 1989) was an American lyricist who worked frequently with Gene de Paul and Bob Rothberg, among others. His older brother, Al Rinker, was one of the famous Rhythm Boys with Bing Crosby in the late 1920s. His sister, Mildred Bailey, was a popular and influential American jazz singer during the 1930s.

His mother, Josephine, was an enrolled member of the Coeur d'Alene people and a devout Roman Catholic. His father, Charles, played fiddle and called square dances. His mother played piano every evening after supper. His brother was vocalist and composer Al Rinker. His sister, Mildred Bailey, was a popular and influential American jazz singer during the 1930s.

Charles Rinker wrote twenty-seven songs with Gene de Paul, including "Your Name is Love", which has been recorded by George Shearing, Nancy Wilson, and others.
