= Janet Campbell Hale =

American writer (1946–2021)

Janet Campbell Hale (January 11, 1946 – November 23, 2021) was a Native American writer and professor. She was Coeur d'Alene and of Ktunaxa and Cree descent. In a sparse style that has been compared to Hemingway, Hale's work often explored issues of Native American identity and discusses poverty, abuse, and the condition of women in society. She wrote Bloodlines: Odyssey of a Native Daughter (1993), which includes a discussion of the Native American experience as well as stories from her own life. She also wrote The Owl's Song (1974), The Jailing of Cecelia Capture (which was nominated for the Pulitzer Prize in 1985), Women on the Run (1999), and Custer Lives in Humboldt County & Other Poems (1978).

== Early life ==
Janet Campbell Hale was born on January 11, 1946, in Riverside, California. Her father, Nicholas Patrick Campbell, was a Coeur d'Alene Indian who became an American citizen after his service in the U.S. Army in the first world war, and Margaret Sullivan Campbell, a Canadian with an Irish-Canadian father and a Kootenay/Cree mother. The family lived on the Coeur D'Alene reservation; while her siblings had been born on the reservation, a brother born the previous winter had only lived a few hours, so to avoid hazardous winter weather, the family temporarily relocated to southern California for Janet's birth and returned to northern Idaho in June 1946. They lived on the reservation until 1956.

Hale attended high school in Wapato, Washington, before transferring to the Institute of American Indian Arts in Santa Fe, New Mexico.

== Early writing ==
Hale won the Vincent Price Poetry Competition in 1963 and a New York Poetry Day award in 1964. She contributed the poems "Red Eagle" and "Nespelim Man (a song)" to The Whispering Wind: poetry by young American Indians, in 1972.

In 1974, she published The Owl's Song, a book for young adults telling the story of fourteen year old Billy White Hawk, who leaves his alcoholic father and moves from an Idaho reservation to live with his sister in California. He encounters prejudice from his fellow students and finds support from an art teacher and a tribal elder, who explains that for many tribes, the owl is the bringer of death and its song is despair; the title of the book comes from the elder's declaration "There is little left of what once was. The time is coming when even this will be gone, taken away. And we will be no more. The time is coming when the owl's song will be for our race."

== Themes ==
Capture is a major theme in Janet Campbell Hale's writing. The name of the protagonist in the eponymous Jailing of Cecelia Capture is named for capture, but is also both literally and figuratively captured at different points in the narrative. Part of the dynamics of Bloodlines is to invert the white narratives about the capture of white people by Native Americans, into an account of capture of Native peoples by European-descended people. Escape and transformation of capture figure in several of her works.

== Teaching ==
Janet Campbell Hale taught at Northwest Indian College, Iowa State University, College of Illinois, and University of California, Santa Cruz, and has served as resident writer at University of Oregon and University of Washington.

== Death ==
Hale died from complications associated with COVID-19 in Coeur d' Alene, Idaho, on November 23, 2021, at the age of 75.

== See also ==
- List of writers from peoples indigenous to the Americas
