= Idaho v. Coeur d'Alene Tribe of Idaho =

- Supreme Court of the United States

Argued October 16, 1996 Decided June 23, 1997
- Full case name: Idaho, et al., Petitioners v. Coeur d'Alene Tribe of Idaho, etc., et al.
- Citations: 521 U.S. 261 (more) 117 S. Ct. 2028; 138 L. Ed. 2d 438; 65 U.S.L.W. 4540; 27 Envtl. L. Rep. 21,227; 97 Cal. Daily Op. Serv. 4776; 97 Daily Journal D.A.R. 7871; 97 CJ C.A.R. 1000; 11 Fla. L. Weekly Fed. S 90

Case history
- Prior: 798 F. Supp. 1443 (D. Idaho 1992), aff'd in part, rev'd in part, 42 F.3d 1244 (9th Cir. 1994), cert. granted, 517 U.S. 1132 (1996), and cert. denied, 517 U.S. 1133 (1996).
- Subsequent: On remand, 118 F.3d 1399 (9th Cir. 1997).

Holding
- The Tribe's suit is not covered by the Ex parte Young exception to state immunity from suit.

Court membership
- Chief Justice William Rehnquist Associate Justices John P. Stevens · Sandra Day O'Connor; Antonin Scalia · Anthony Kennedy; David Souter · Clarence Thomas; Ruth Bader Ginsburg · Stephen Breyer

Case opinions
- Majority: Kennedy (Parts I, II–A, and III), joined by Rehnquist, O'Connor, Scalia, Thomas
- Concurrence: Kennedy (Parts II–B, II–C, and II–D), joined by Rehnquist
- Concurrence: O'Connor (in part), joined by Scalia, Thomas
- Dissent: Souter, joined by Stevens, Ginsburg, Breyer

Laws applied
- U.S. Const. amend XI

Idaho v. Coeur d'Alene Tribe of Idaho, 521 U.S. 261 (1997), was a United States Supreme Court case in which the Court held that the Coeur d'Alene Tribe could not maintain an action against the state of Idaho to press its claim to Lake Coeur d'Alene due to the state's Eleventh Amendment immunity from suit, notwithstanding the exception recognized in Ex parte Young. The case was an important precedent for aboriginal title in the United States and sovereign immunity in the United States.

After the district court's decision dismissing the suit, the federal government—in its guardian capacity—brought a substantially similar suit against Idaho; in 2001, in 5–4 decision, the Court ruled for the federal government: Idaho v. United States (2001).
