= Mineral Ridge National Recreation Trail =

Hiking trail in Idaho, United States

Coordinates: 47.609075°N 116.644348°W

Mineral Ridge National Recreation Trail, Idaho
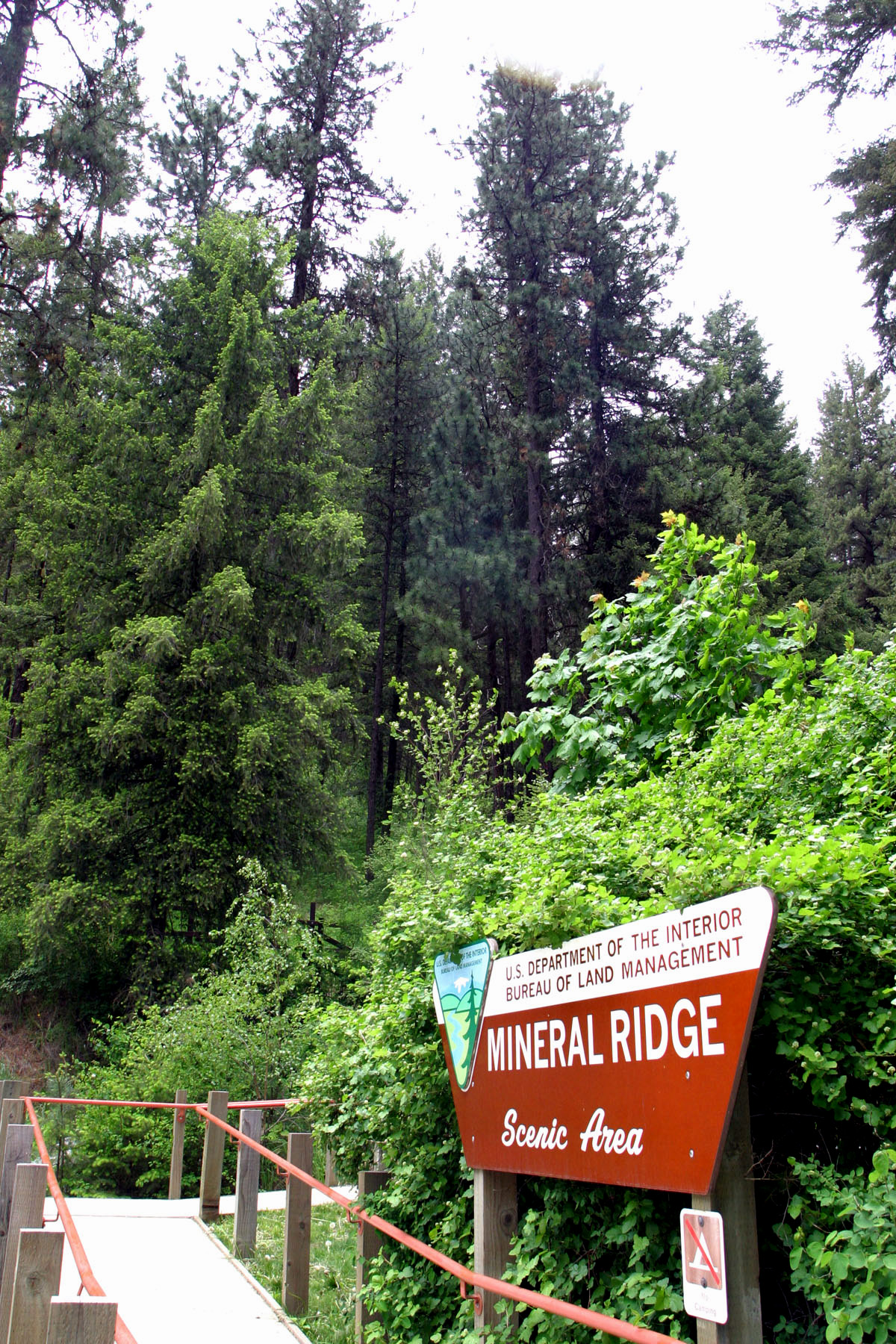
- Trailhead
- Length: 3.3 mi (5.3 km)
- Location: Kootenai County, Idaho, United States
- Designation: National Recreation Trail
- Use: Hiking, Outdoor education
- Elevation change: 600 ft (180 m)
- Highest point: Summit of Mineral Ridge, 2,400 ft (730 m)
- Lowest point: Parking lot of the trail
- Difficulty: Trail grade is an average of 8%, with a 15% maximum
- Season: Year round access
- Sights: Beauty Bay on Lake Coeur d'Alene

Mineral Ridge National Recreation Trail is a backcountry hiking area near Lake Coeur d'Alene in Kootenai County, Idaho, United States. It is administered by the Bureau of Land Management (BLM). Construction began on the trail in 1963 and the area was designated as a National Recreation Trail in 1982. There is a self-guided interpretive tour along the 3.3-mile (5.3 km) trail.

== Flora ==
The two main types of trees along the trail are Ponderosa Pine and Douglas Fir.
