= Edward Heyman =

American lyricist (1907–1981)

Background information
- Born: Edward Heyman; March 14, 1907
- Origin: New York City, U.S.
- Died: October 16, 1981 (aged 74) Jalisco, Mexico
- Occupations: Lyricist; producer

Edward Heyman (March 14, 1907 – October 16, 1981) was an American lyricist and producer, best known for his lyrics to "Body and Soul", "When I Fall in Love", and "For Sentimental Reasons". He also contributed to a number of songs for films.

== Biography ==
Heyman studied at the University of Michigan, where he had an early start on his career writing college musicals. After graduating from college, Heyman moved back to New York City, where he started working with a number of experienced musicians including Victor Young ("When I Fall in Love"), Dana Suesse ("You Oughta Be in Pictures") and Johnny Green ("Body and Soul", "Out of Nowhere", "I Cover the Waterfront" and "Easy Come, Easy Go").

From 1935 to 1952, Heyman contributed songs to film scores including Sweet Surrender, That Girl from Paris, Curly Top, The Kissing Bandit, Delightfully Dangerous and Northwest Outpost.

Arguably Heyman's biggest hit is his lyric to "Body and Soul", written in 1930, which was often recorded (notably in 1939 by Coleman Hawkins and by many others) and which frequently crops up in films, most recently in 2002's Catch Me If You Can. Heyman also wrote "Through the Years", "For Sentimental Reasons", "Blame It on My Youth" (with Oscar Levant), "Love Letters", "Blue Star" (theme of the television series Medic), "The Wonder of You", "Boo-Hoo", "Bluebird of Happiness", "They Say", and "You're Mine, You!"

Heyman was an ASCAP writer inducted into the Songwriters Hall of Fame in 1975.

== See also ==
Songs with lyrics by Edward Heyman
