= Idaho v. United States =

- Supreme Court of the United States

Argued April 23, 2001 Decided June 18, 2001
- Full case name: Idaho v. United States
- Docket no.: 00-189
- Citations: 533 U.S. 262 (more) 121 S. Ct. 2135; 150 L. Ed. 2d 326; 2001 U.S. LEXIS 4665

Case history
- Prior: United States v. Idaho (In re Coeur d'Alene Lake), 95 F. Supp. 2d 1094, 1998 U.S. Dist. LEXIS 22906 (D. Idaho 1998); United States v. Coeur d'Alene Tribe, 210 F.3d 1067, 2000 U.S. App. LEXIS 8583 (9th Cir. 2000)

Holding
- The United States, not the state of Idaho, held title to lands submerged under Lake Coeur d'Alene, and that the land was held in trust for the Coeur d'Alene Tribe.

Court membership
- Chief Justice William Rehnquist Associate Justices John P. Stevens · Sandra Day O'Connor; Antonin Scalia · Anthony Kennedy; David Souter · Clarence Thomas; Ruth Bader Ginsburg · Stephen Breyer

Case opinions
- Majority: Souter, joined by Stevens, O'Connor, Ginsburg, Breyer
- Dissent: Rehnquist, joined by Scalia, Kennedy, Thomas

Idaho v. United States, 533 U.S. 262 (2001), was a United States Supreme Court case in which the Court held that the United States, not the state of Idaho, held title to lands submerged under Lake Coeur d'Alene and the St. Joe River, and that the land was held in trust for the Coeur d'Alene Tribe as part of its reservation, and in recognition (established in the 19th century) of the importance of traditional tribal uses of these areas for basic food and other needs.

== Background ==
=== History ===
The Coeur d'Alene Tribe is a Native American tribe in northern Idaho. The Coeur d'Alene people once inhabited 3,500,000 acres (1,400,000 ha) in northern Idaho, Washington, and Montana, but today, the only land controlled by the tribal nation is the Coeur d'Alene Reservation in Benewah and Kootenai counties, Idaho.

In 1853, the territorial governor of Washington (which at the time included the panhandle of Idaho), Isaac Stevens, began to negotiate treaties with local tribes. By 1855, Stevens had treaties with most of the tribes in the area, but not including the Coeur d'Alene tribe. At the same time, gold had been discovered near Fort Colvile and on the Yakima reservation. By September 1853, Yakima Indians killed six prospectors in retaliation for attacks on the tribes by trespassing miners. Stevens negotiated a fragile peace in 1856, (Note: Stevens also declared martial law and imprisoned farmers (and a judge, Judge Edward M. Lander) for suspected sympathies with the Indians. Lander was arrested after he issued a writ of habeas corpus for the release of the farmers. Territorial Supreme Court Justice Francis A. Chenoweth issued writs for the release of both the farmers and Lander, and ordered the Pierce County Sheriff to form a posse to enforce the orders. Stevens backed down. Stevens eventually was fined $50 for contempt of court and was censured by both the territorial legislature and the U.S. Senate.) but the U.S. Army was unable to keep prospectors out of Indian lands. By 1858 hostilities sparked again.

In May 1858, Colonel Steptoe led a group of about 130 dragoons north toward the Coeur d'Alene lands. On May 16, 1858, he was met by a force of about 600 Indians (Note: Palouse, Coeur d'Alene, Spokane, and a few Nez Perce, who refused to allow Steptoe to cross the river.) who, after blocking Steptoe's path forward, began to fight the next day. Steptoe withdrew after losses of men and upon running low in ammunition.

In 1867, President Andrew Johnson established a reservation for the Coeur d'Alene tribe at the request of the territorial governor, but the tribe never accepted the reservation as Lake Coeur d'Alene and the main waterways, on which they depended for fishing, were not included. The tribe depended on the rivers and the lake for fish, camas, reeds for baskets, and other needs. In 1873, the Commissioner of Indian Affairs sent a commission to induce the Coeur d'Alenes to accept a reservation. Following negotiations, a reservation of approximately 598,000 acres (242,000 ha) was established. The reservation boundaries included the Hangman Valley, the Coeur d'Alene River, the St. Joe River, and all but a small portion of Lake Coeur d'Alene.

The agreement was implemented with an executive order, which was intended to be temporary until Congress approved it. Cession of land was supposed to be compensated. Congress never approved the action, and in 1883 the United States conducted a survey of the reservation. Congress in 1886 authorized the Secretary of the Interior to negotiate with the tribe, to gain their cession of all of their land outside the reservation. In 1887 the tribe and the federal government came to an agreement under those terms, but Lake Coeur d'Alene and related waters were part of the reservation. In 1889, the tribe ceded the northern third of the reservation back to the federal government, including part of Lake Coeur d'Alene, for compensation. Unusually, in contrast to practices at the time, the reservation boundary was drawn across the lake, rather than by meandering the high water line. The agreement stated that it was not binding until ratified by Congress.

Prior to Senate ratification of both agreements, Idaho became a state. Congress passed the Idaho Statehood Act that ratified the state constitution, which contained a section disclaiming the state's rights to unappropriated public lands and lands owned by tribes. In 1891, Congress ratified the earlier agreements with the tribe. In 1894, the tribe ceded a one-mile wide strip (the "Harrison cession") for use by the Washington and Idaho Railway to extend its tracks. In 1908 Congress gave Idaho an area now known as Heyburn State Park.

This area of Idaho was known for mining and has long held the nickname of "Silver Valley." It has been the second-largest area of silver production in the country. From 1880 to 1980 the Coeur d'Alene basin was one of the most productive silver, lead, and zinc mining regions in the country. The waste from the mining, estimated at 72 million tons, contaminated land and downstream waters, including the Coeur d'Alene River and Lake Coeur d'Alene. As of 2012, the Silver Valley was the second largest Superfund cleanup site in the nation, as designated by the United States Environmental Protection Agency (EPA).

=== Prior court action ===
For years the Coeur d'Alene tried to work with the state on clean-up and management of Lake Coeur d'Alene, but was unable to reach agreement on gaining a larger role. In 1991, the tribe notified the state of its intent to sue for title of the lake and submerged lands beneath. The case was brought in the U.S. District Court which initially held that a suit by the tribe against the state was barred by the Eleventh Amendment. The tribe appealed the decision to the Ninth Circuit Court. The Ninth Circuit affirmed in part and reversed in part, and the state appealed to the U.S. Supreme Court.

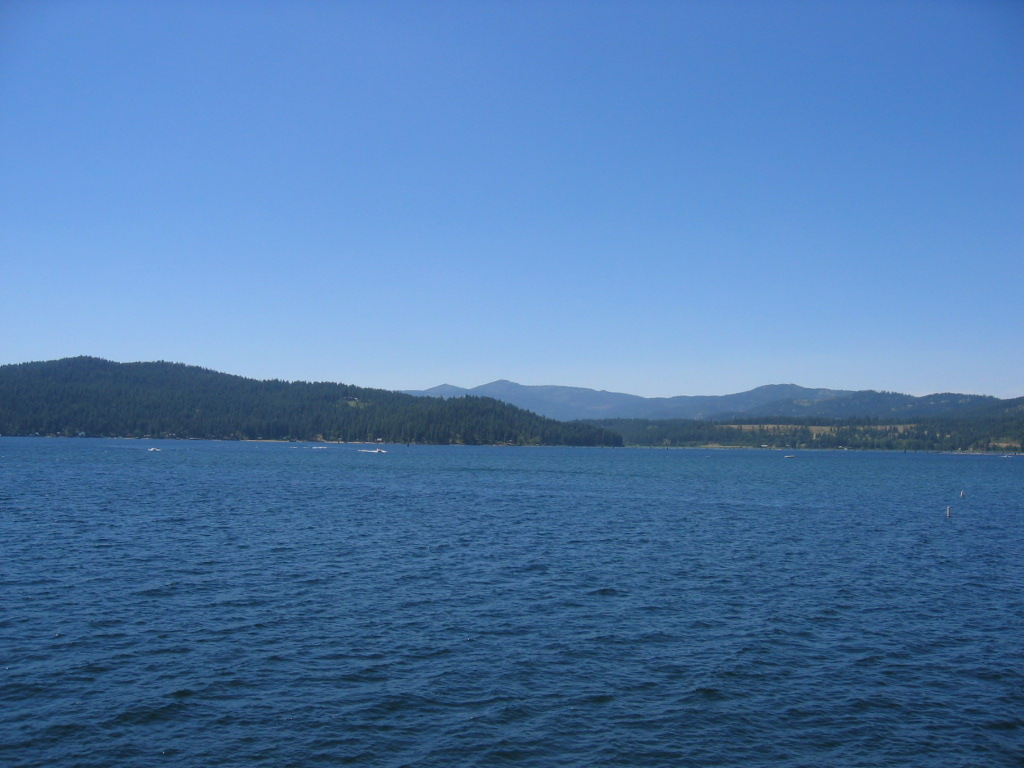
Lake Coeur d'Alene, Idaho

In the Supreme Court, Justice Anthony Kennedy delivered the majority opinion which held that the Eleventh Amendment barred direct lawsuits by tribes against a state. The decision was 5–4, with Chief Justice William Rehnquist and Justices O'Connor, Scalia, and Thomas joining Kennedy. Justice David Souter dissented, joined by Justices Stevens, Ginsburg, and Breyer.

The Coeur d'Alene tribe requested that the United States sue to quiet title to the submerged lands on the reservation. The tribe moved to intervene on the side of the United States in this suit, and the court granted the request. The court found that the earlier executive agreements had clearly intended to reserve the lake and submerged land for the use of the tribe, and ruled for the United States.

The state appealed the ruling to the Ninth Circuit Court. The Ninth Circuit affirmed the decision of the trial court, pointing out additional information that supported the lower court's ruling that was not in the District Court's memorandum opinion.

The state again appealed and the Supreme Court granted certiorari.

== Supreme Court ==
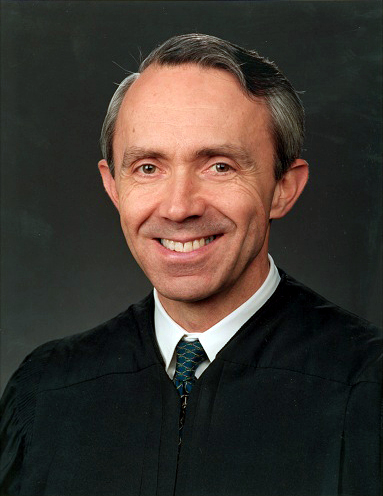
Justice David Souter, author of the majority opinion

=== Arguments ===
Steven W. Strack argued the cause for the state of Idaho. David C. Frederick argued the cause for the United States, and Raymond C. Givens argued the cause for the Coeur d'Alene tribe.

=== Opinion of the court ===
Justice Souter delivered the opinion of the court. This decision was the opposite of the earlier decision in Idaho v. Coeur d'Alene Tribe of Idaho, with Justice O'Connor now voting with the dissenters in that case. Basically repeating his earlier dissent, Souter noted that the presumption was that the state had ownership of all submerged lands, unless it was clear that the United States had reserved those lands for itself. Souter observed that the 1873 executive order implicitly included the submerged lands and also noted that the 1888 report to Congress indicated that all of the submerged lands were retained in trust for the tribe, and that Congress knew this when they passed the Idaho statehood act. He also noted the trial court's finding that the federal government had consistently treated with the tribe over the submerged lands, including compensating the tribe for the railroad right of way. In this case it was clear that the United States had retained the rights of title to the submerged land, overcoming the presumption of state ownership. The decision of the Court of Appeals was affirmed, that the United States held title to the land.

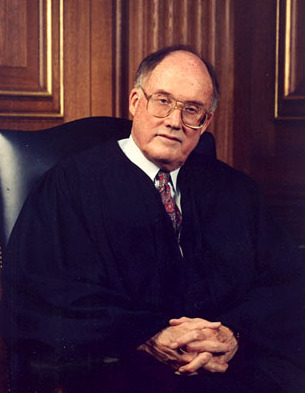
Chief Justice William Rehnquist, author of the dissent

=== Dissent ===
Chief Justice Rehnquist dissented from the majority opinion. He stated that once the Idaho statehood act was passed, the title to the submerged lands transferred to the state. Any subsequent look at actions of the Congress, even in ratifying agreements that antedated statehood were of no consequence, and should not have been considered by the majority. The only action that would have retained tribal and federal ownership of the submerged lands would have been an action prior to Idaho becoming a state. He would have reversed and remanded the case.

=== Subsequent developments ===
A year after the decision, the tribe applied to the Environmental Protection Agency (EPA) for authority to enforce water standards under the Clean Water Act. Negotiations with the state, the tribe and the EPA began but broke down when both the state and the EPA could not match the $5,000,000 budget provided by the tribe. In 2005, the EPA granted this authority, allowing the tribe to regulate non-members as necessary for the health and welfare of the tribe. The three parties came together again, and after arbitration, agreed on a management plan as part of a settlement in 2009.

The tribe has proceeded to file lawsuits requiring cleanup against mining companies for contamination of waters and land. State and federal politicians have moved to limit the damages that could be collected against the companies.
