= For Sentimental Reasons (1936 song) =

Song by Abner Silver, Al Sherman and Edward Heyman, Al Sherman

"For Sentimental Reasons" is a song by Abner Silver, Al Sherman and Edward Heyman, which was first released on October 18, 1936. It was recorded by Tommy Dorsey and his Orchestra featuring a vocal by Jack Leonard, as well as by Mildred Bailey and Her Orchestra.
