= Coeur d'Alene people =

Native American tribe in Idaho, United States

Coeur d'Alene Tribe
Schi̱tsu'umsh Skitswish
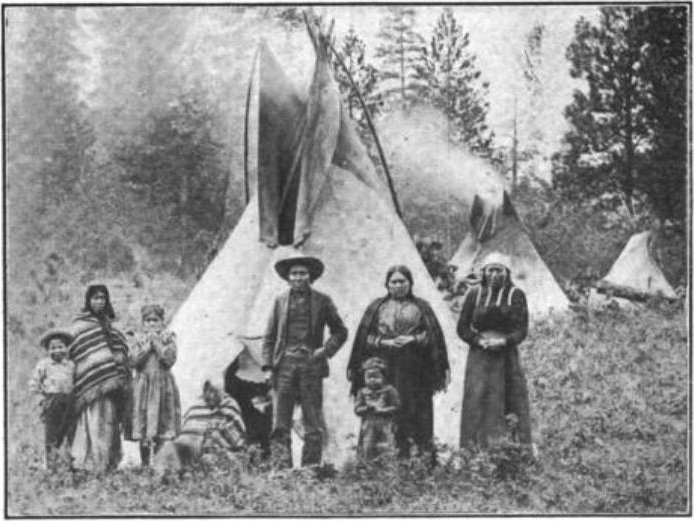
- Coeur d'Alene people and tipis, Desmet Reservation, c. 1907

Total population
- 1,976 (2015 census)

Regions with significant populations
- United States; Idaho

Languages
- English • Coeur d'Alene

The Coeur d'Alene Tribe (/kɜːrdəˈleɪn/ kur-də-LAYN; also Skitswish; Coeur d'Alene: Schi̱tsu'umsh) are a Native American tribe and one of five federally recognized tribes in the state of Idaho. The Coeur d'Alene have sovereign control of their Coeur d'Alene Reservation, which includes a significant portion of Lake Coeur d'Alene and its submerged lands.

In Idaho v. United States (2001), the United States Supreme Court ruled against the state's claim of the submerged lands of the lower third of Lake Coeur d'Alene and related waters of the St. Joe River. It said that the Coeur d'Alene were the traditional owners and that the Executive Branch and Congress had clearly included this area in their reservation, with compensation for ceded territory. This area was designated in 1983 by the Environmental Protection Agency as Bunker Hill Mine and Smelting Complex, the nation's second-largest Superfund site for cleanup.

Concerned at the slow pace of progress, in 1991 the tribe filed suit against mining companies for damages and cleanup costs, joined in 1996 by the United States and in 2011 by the state of Idaho. Settlements were reached with major defendants in 2008 and 2011, providing funds to be used in removal of hazardous wastes and restoration of habitat and natural resources.

Historically the Coeur d'Alene occupied a territory of 3.5 million acres in present-day northern Idaho, Eastern Washington and Western Montana. They lived in villages along the Coeur d'Alene, St. Joe, Clark Fork, and Spokane rivers, as well as sites on the shores of Lake Coeur d'Alene, Lake Pend Oreille, and Hayden Lake. Their native language is Snchitsu'umshtsn, an Interior Salishan language. They are one of the Salish language peoples, which tribes occupy areas of the inland plateau and the coastal areas of the Pacific Northwest.

== Name ==
The French name Cœur d'Alêne translates to "heart of an awl". The name is first recorded by the Lewis and Clark Expedition (1805) and was later popularly said to have been given by French traders to one of the chiefs of the tribe noted for his stinginess. The alternative name Skitswish is recorded by Alexander Henry the younger in 1810 (as Skeetshue) and by George Gibbs in Pacific Railroad Report vol. 1 (1853). This is an exonym used by the Sahaptin.

The self-designation Schi̲tsu'umsh is reported from Coeur d'Alene phrasebooks since the 1970s. A modern speaker of Coeur d'Alene was reported as interpreting this name as "the discovered people".

The federally recognized tribe was named the Coeur D'Alene Tribe of the Coeur D'Alene Reservation, but they shortened it to Coeur D'Alene Tribe.

== Geography ==
Historically, the Coeur d'Alene lived in what would become the Panhandle region of Idaho and neighboring areas of what is today eastern Washington and western Montana, occupying an area of more than 3,500,000 acres (14,000 km^{2}) of grass-covered hills, camas-prairie, forested mountains, lakes, marshes, and river habitat. The territory extended from the southern end of Lake Pend Oreille in the north, running along the Bitterroot Range of Montana in the east, to the Palouse and North Fork of the Clearwater River in the south, to Steptoe Butte and up to just east of Spokane Falls in the west. At the center of this region was Lake Coeur d'Alene. The abundant natural resources included trout, salmon, and whitefish. The tribe supplemented hunting and gathering activities by fishing the St. Joe and Spokane rivers. They used gaff hooks, spears, nets, traps and angled for fish.

== History ==
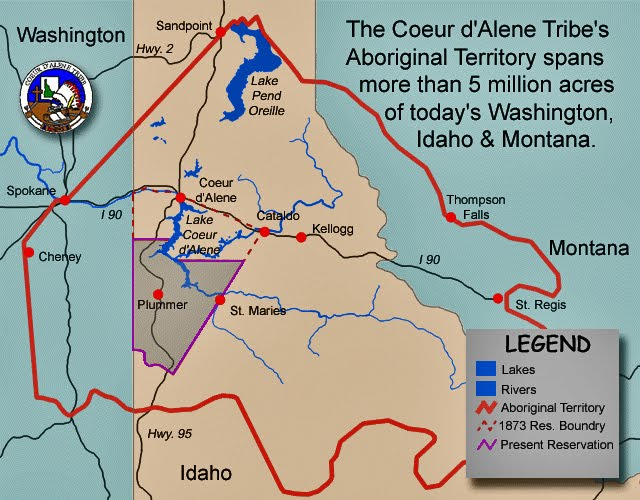
Aboriginal territory of the Coeur d'Alene tribe, cdatribe-nsn.gov (ca. 2003)

An Interior Salish peoples, the Coeur d'Alene people first encountered Europeans in 1793. Then their economy was based on fishing, hunting, and plant gathering, with seasonal migratory patterns and retreating to clustered semi-subterranean dwellings during the winter months. The precontact lifeways of Interior Salish peoples are not widely written about, but available evidence favors the possibility of a recent expansion from the coast to the interior, possibly related to an increase in coastal population about 600 to 900 years ago.

The earliest written description of the Coeur d'Alene people comes from the journals of Alexander Henry the younger, a fur trader with the North West Company. He and British explorer David Thompson traded and traveled in their lands from 1810 to 1814. He wrote about the Coeur d'Alene:

The Skeetshue [Skitsuish] or Pointed Hearts [Coeur d'Alene] Indians dwell further southward [than the Kallispell or Pend d'Oreille tribes], about Skeetshue [Coeur d'Alene] Lake and [Spokane] River; they are a distinct nation, and have a different language [Salish] from the Flat Heads. They are very numerous, and have a vast number of horses, as their country is open and admits of breeding them in great abundance.

Ross Cox, a clerk with the Pacific Fur Company and then the North West Company, spent considerable time at the trading post of Spokane House between 1812 and 1817:

The Pointed Hearts, or as the [French] Canadians call them, les Coeurs d' Alênes (Hearts of Awls), are a small tribe inhabiting the shores of a lake about fifty miles to the eastward of Spokan House. Their country is tolerably well stocked with beaver, deer, wild-fowl, &c.; and its vegetable productions are similar to those of Spokan. Some of this tribe occasionally visited our fort at the latter place with furs to barter, and we made a few excursions to their lands. We found them uniformly honest in their traffic; but they did not evince the same warmth of friendship for us as the Spokans, and expressed no desire for the establishment of a trading post among them.
About twenty years before our arrival [hence in the early 1790s], the Spokans and Pointed Hearts were at war, caused by a kind of Trojan origin. A party of the former [Spokane Indians] had been on a hunting visit to the land of the latter [Coeur d'Alene], and were hospitably received. One day, a young Spokan discovered the wife of a Pointed Heart alone, some distance from the village, and violated her. Although she might have born this in silence from one of her own tribe, she was not as equally forbearing with regard to a stranger, and immediately informed her husband of the outrage. He lost no time in seeking revenge, and shot the Spokan as he entered the village. The others fled to their own lands, and prepared for war. A succession of sanguinary conflicts followed, in the course of which the greatest warriors of both side were nearly destroyed. At the end of a year, however, hostilities ceased; since which period they have been at peace. The two nations now intermarry, and appear to be on the best terms of friendship.

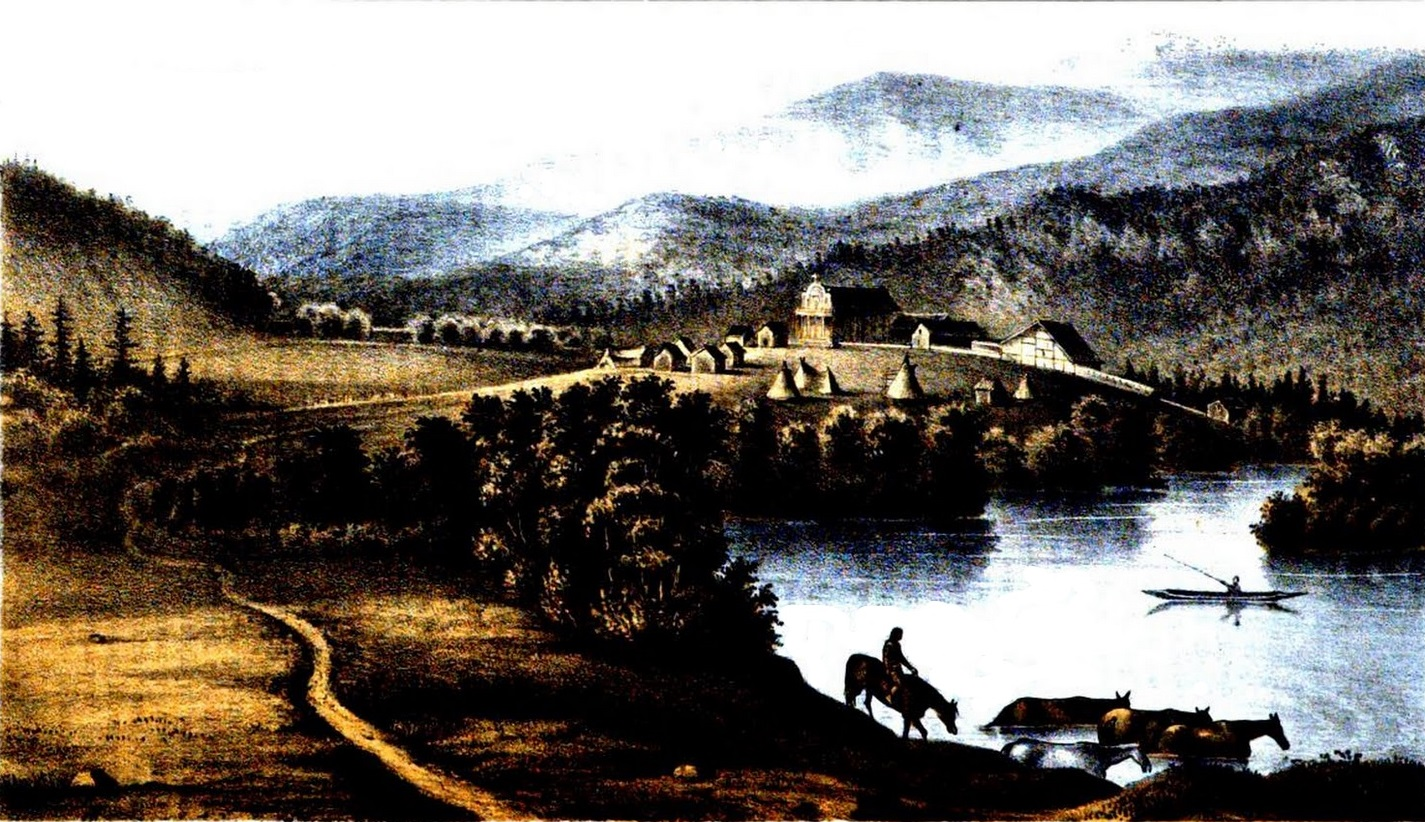
Coeur d'Alene Mission of the Sacred Heart on Lake Coeur d'Alene in Idaho, United States, about 1855.

Many of the tribe were converted to Roman Catholicism in 1842 by Fr. Pierre-Jean De Smet, a Belgian Jesuit missionary from St. Louis, Missouri, who was active throughout the Northwest. The twin towns of De Smet and Tensed (originally Temsed), Idaho, are named for him. The United States acquired this territory in 1846 by treaty with Great Britain. European-American settlers and other immigrants began to move from the United States into parts of the territory in the 1840s. After the Indian defeat in the Skitswish War of May–September 1858, many more speculators were attracted after the discovery of silver in 1863 in the north Panhandle near the city of Coeur d'Alene. Mining and development revealed this to be an area of the second-largest silver deposits in the United States.

In 1873 the Coeur d'Alene lands were reduced to approximately 600,000 acres (940 sq mi; 2,400 km^{2}) when President Ulysses S. Grant established the Coeur d'Alene Indian Reservation by executive order. Chief Peter Moctelme traveled to Washington D.C. to meet with the President to discuss his disagreement of allotments. Upon ratification, Chief Peter Moctelme's land was reduced by 1/3 and sold to white settlers. The US agreement with the tribe "expressly included part of the St. Joe River (then called the St. Joseph), and all of Lake Coeur d'Alene except a sliver cut off by the northern boundary."

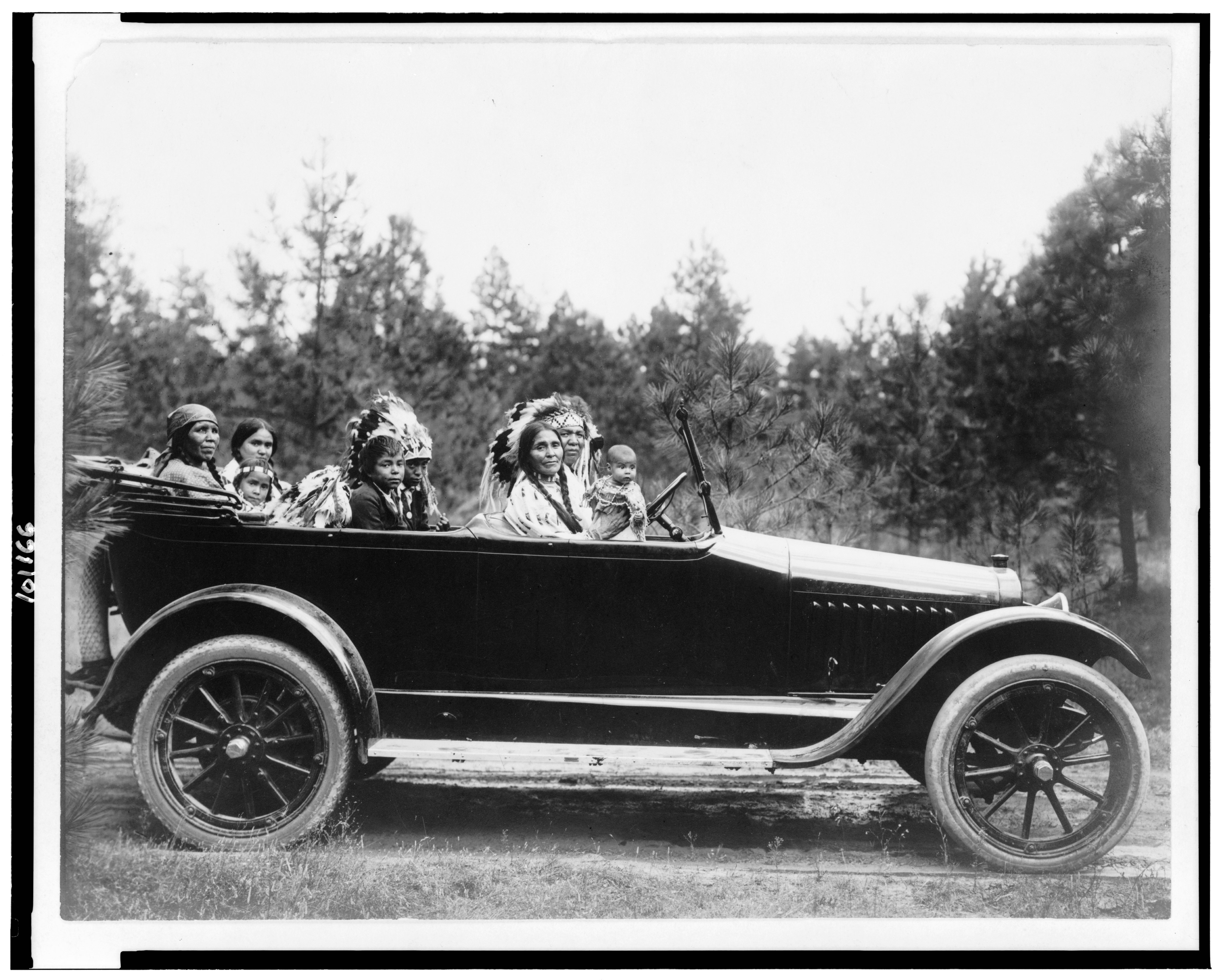
Coeur D'Alene man, Phillip Wildshoe and family, in his Chalmers automobile.

As of 1885, Congress had neither ratified the 1873 agreement nor compensated the Tribe. This inaction prompted the Tribe to petition the Government again, to "make with us a proper treaty of peace and friendship ... by which your petitioners may be properly and fully compensated for such portion of their lands not now reserved to them; [and] that their present reserve may be confirmed to them." Successive government acts put a reservation boundary across Lake Coeur d'Alene, rather than following customary practice of using the high water line, and reduced the size of the reservation to 345,000 acres (1,400 km^{2}) near Plummer, south of the town of Coeur d'Alene.

=== 20th century to present ===
Due to extensive mining and smelting operations in the Panhandle during the 19th and 20th centuries, there was hazardous waste in water discharges and pollution in air emissions. The mining industry "left several thousand acres of land and tributaries, connected to the Coeur d'Alene Basin, contaminated with heavy metals." These mining operations have contributed "an estimated 100 million tons of mine waste to the river system."

In the early 21st century, the federally recognized Tribe has approximately 2,000 enrolled citizens. The Tribe manages the sovereign Coeur d'Alene Reservation, which includes the lower third of Lake Coeur d'Alene and the Saint Joe River, and their submerged lands.

In 1935, Ignace Garry was one of a group of chiefs who managed the tribe. In 1949 he was selected as the last traditional chief of the Coeur d'Alene; he served until his death in 1965. During this period the tribe worked to restore its government under the Indian Reorganization Act of 1934. It gained approval of a written constitution in 1949 and elected representatives to the Tribal Council. In the 1950s, the tribe was one of several that came under termination pressure by the United States Congress.

Map of the Coeur d'Alene tribal territory and neighboring tribes in Idaho.

Within Idaho, in the late 20th century the Coeur d'Alene organized with the four other federally recognized tribes in the state to form the Five Tribes Council, including the Kootenai Tribe of Idaho, Nez Perce, Shoshone-Bannock, and Shoshone-Paiute.

== Government ==
The tribe reorganized under a written constitution approved by the Bureau of Indian Affairs, United States Department of Interior, on September 2, 1949, and amended in 1961. The constitution provides for an elected Tribal Council to serve as the legislature and governing body of the Tribe. It defined all tribal members of voting age as the General Council. At the time, the Tribe was still governed by Ignace Garry, the last traditional chief. The seven members of the tribal council are elected by citizens of the tribe to 3-year terms; with staggered expiration years. The elected head of the tribe is the chairman.

Since 2005, the chairman has been Chief James Allan ("Chief" is his given first name). Born in 1972 in Spokane, Allan grew up in Idaho on the Coeur d'Alene Reservation and graduated from Eastern Washington University in Cheney. He served in administrative and elected positions in the tribe and with the National Congress of American Indians in Washington, DC before being elected as chairman.

Joseph Garry, son of Chief Ignace, was the first Native American to be elected to the Idaho state legislature. He also served as chairman of the tribe for 10 years. In 1984 his niece, Jeanne Givens, was the first Native American woman to be elected to the Idaho state legislature, serving two terms.

The Coeur d'Alene Tribe operates a health care facility, which opened as the Benewah Medical Center in 1998 and was later renamed Marimn Health. The center was described by the Indian Health Service as a national model for Indian Health Care and rural health care. The clinic provides comprehensive primary care services including dental, mental health services, and community health outreach services to both the Native American population and general community.

== Economy ==
Tribal businesses include the Coeur d'Alene Casino, Hotel, and Circling Raven Golf Club in southwestern Kootenai County, about three miles (4.8 km) northwest of Worley and thirty miles (48 km) south of the city of Coeur d'Alene, via U.S. Route 95. Tribal gaming employs about 500 and generates about $20 million in profits annually, funding programs, contributing to economic development.

The tribe also operates the Benewah Automotive Center, the Benewah Market, the first three floors of the Coeur d'Alene Resort, and Ace Hardware, which are located a few miles south of Worley at Plummer, in northwestern Benewah County. The tribe has invested in two businesses, a manufacturing plant (BERG Integrated Systems), and a bakery (HearthBread Bakery), in both of which the tribe owns a majority share.

The tribal farm covers about 6,000 acres (24 km^{2}). It produces wheat, barley, peas, lentils, and canola. It also harvests timber among its natural resources.

== Culture ==
Tribal traditions include a respect and reverence for natural law, and for responsible environmental stewardship. The tribe is active in the protection, conservation and enhancement of fish and wildlife resources; as well as conservation issues that impact tribal land and water resources.

Traditionally the tribe had a flexible kinship system with both paternal and maternal lines recognized within the extended family. People may claim ancestors on either side, and address all cousins the same. This enabled them to have a flexible society, as they would live in differently sized groups during different seasons, in order to adapt to the environment.

== Environmental suit, land claim and compensation ==
In 1991, the Coeur d'Alene Tribe began the Coeur d'Alene Basin Restoration Project. That year tribal leaders, including Henry SiJohn, Lawrence Aripa, and Richard Mullen, decided to file a lawsuit against the mining companies, as they were concerned that cleanup progress by EPA and the state was too slow in the Basin and at the Bunker Hill Mine and Smelting Complex Superfund site. They filed suit against Hecla Mining Company, ASARCO and other companies for damages and recovery of cleanup costs of the site. In 1996 their suit was joined by the United States.

In 2001 the United States and the Coeur d'Alene litigated a 78-day trial against Hecla and ASARCO over liability issues. In 2008, ASARCO LLC, reached a settlement of $452 million with the Coeur d'Alene Tribe and United States for the Bunker Hill site after emerging from Chapter 11 bankruptcy.

In 2011 the government, the Coeur d'Alene, and the state of Idaho (which joined the suit that year) reached settlement with the Hecla Mining Company to resolve one of the largest cases ever filed under CERCLA, the Superfund statute. Hecla Mining Company will pay $263.4 million plus interest to the United States and other parties to "resolve claims stemming from releases of wastes from its mining operations. Settlement funds will be dedicated to restoration and remediation of natural resources in the Coeur d'Alene Basin." The trustees intend to restore habitat for fish, birds and other natural resources, for stewardship while working for economic progress in the region. This was one of the top 10 settlement cash awards in Superfund history.

In a related case, at the turn of the 21st century, U.S. courts ruled in Idaho v. United States (2001) that the Coeur d'Alene tribe has legal jurisdiction over the submerged land of the lower third of Lake Coeur d'Alene, which the US holds in trust for the tribe, as well as under a related 20 miles (32 km) of the St. Joe River. The case was initiated by the US government to "quiet title" with the state, and the Tribe entered to assert its interest. The State of Idaho had appealed a lower court decision but that was upheld by the United States Supreme Court.

The tribe has worked with the US Department of Justice in filing suit also against the Union Pacific Railroad over contamination of the lake and related lands.

== In media ==
Smoke Signals (1998) is an independent film that was set in the Coeur d'Alene Reservation. It was based on the short story, "This Is What It Means to Say Phoenix, Arizona", collected in the book The Lone Ranger and Tonto Fistfight in Heaven (1993) by Sherman Alexie (Spokane-Coeur d'Alene). Alexie wrote the screenplay and served as film producer. The film focuses on a personal quest journey of two young men from the Coeur d'Alene Reservation. It was an all-Native American production.

== Notable people ==
- Peter Moctelme (Chief, Coeur d'Alene Band 1907–1932)
- Sherman Alexie (Spokane-Coeur d'Alene), author and filmmaker
- Lawrence Aripa, one of three leaders who brought the 1991 tribal lawsuit against mining companies for environmental cleanup; vice chairman 1990 to 1998
- Mildred Bailey (1907–1951), popular jazz singer and recording artist of the 1930s and 1940s, performed with Paul Whiteman and Benny Goodman, became known as "Mrs. Swing".
- Ignace Garry, last traditional chief of the Coeur d'Alene, serving with a group from 1935 to 1948, and as chief from 1949 until his death in 1965. Since then chairmen have been elected democratically.
- Joseph Garry, son of Ignace, politician and the first Native American elected to the Idaho State House; also elected as Chairman of the Coeur d'Alene, serving for 10 years.
- Jeanne Givens, politician; in 1984 she was the first Native American woman elected to the Idaho State House, where she served as representative for four years. She is granddaughter of Ignace Garry and niece of Joseph Garry. She was chair of the North Idaho College Board of Trustees; appointed by President Bill Clinton to the Board of Directors of the Institute of American Indian Arts in Santa Fe, N.M., where she served as chair for several years; and served on Board of Directors of Americans for Indian Opportunity
- Janet Campbell Hale, writer
- Paulette Jordan, Democratic candidate for governor of Idaho in 2018 and former member of the Idaho House of Representatives from 2014 to 2018; at her reelection in 2016, she was the only Democrat in state office north of Boise.
- Richard Mullen, historian, one of three leaders who brought the 1991 tribal lawsuit against the mining companies for environmental cleanup; also on Tribal Council and served as vice chairman
- Henry SiJohn, Tribal Council, one of three leaders who brought the 1991 tribal lawsuit against the mining companies for environmental cleanup; vice chairman from October 1998 to his death in February 1999
- Al Rinker, musician and younger brother of Mildred Bailey, grew up on the reservation. Member of the popular trio "The Rhythm Boys" with Bing Crosby and Harry Barris through 1931.
- Charles Rinker, lyricist and younger brother of Mildred Bailey, grew up on the reservation. Active in Los Angeles.

== See also ==
=== Neighboring tribes ===
- Confederated Tribes of the Colville Reservation
- Kootenai-Salish (Flatheads)
- Nez Perce
- Spokane
