= Tensed, Idaho =

- City
- City of Tensed
- Nickname: Gateway to McCroskey State Park
- Location of Tensed in Benewah County, Idaho.
- Coordinates: 47°09′35″N 116°55′26″W
- Country: United States
- State: Idaho
- County: Benewah

Area
  - Total: 0.19 sq mi (0.49 km^{2})
  - Land: 0.19 sq mi (0.49 km^{2})
  - Water: 0 sq mi (0.00 km^{2})
- Elevation: 2,559 ft (780 m)

Population (2020)
  - Total: 84
  - Density: 440/sq mi (170/km^{2})
- Time zone: UTC-8 (Pacific (PST))
  - Summer (DST): UTC-7 (PDT)
- ZIP code: 83870
- Area codes: 208, 986
- FIPS code: 16-80200
- GNIS feature ID: 2412049

Historical population
Census	Pop.	Note	%±
1950	189		—
1960	184		−2.6%
1970	151		−17.9%
1980	113		−25.2%
1990	90		−20.4%
2000	126		40.0%
2010	123		−2.4%
2020	84		−31.7%
U.S. Decennial Census

Tensed is a city in Benewah County, Idaho, United States. The population was 84 at the 2020 census, down from 123 in 2010. The city is within the Coeur d'Alene Reservation, and is accessed by U.S. Route 95, the state's primary north–south highway. The city is located about 1 mile (0.6 km) from the north entrance of McCroskey State Park.

== History ==
The city was originally called Desmet, after the Belgian Jesuit missionary Pierre-Jean De Smet, who was active with the Coeur d'Alene nation, but the post office requested a change as that name was taken by nearby De Smet. The name was reversed to Temsed and then misspelled by the post office.

== Geography ==
According to the United States Census Bureau, the city has a total area of 0.19 square miles (0.49 km^{2}), all of it land.

Latah Creek flows half a mile south of Tensed, approximately halfway between the community and the neighboring community of De Smet.

== Demographics ==
=== 2010 census ===
At the 2010 census there were 123 people in 58 households, including 30 families, in the city. The population density was 647.4 inhabitants per square mile (250.0/km^{2}). There were 69 housing units at an average density of 363.2 per square mile (140.2/km^{2}). The racial makup of the city was 69.1% White, 24.4% Native American, 0.8% from other races, and 5.7% from two or more races. Hispanic or Latino of any race were 0.8%.

Of the 58 households 29.3% had children under the age of 18 living with them, 32.8% were married couples living together, 19.0% had a female householder with no husband present, and 48.3% were non-families. 37.9% of households were one person and 18.9% were one person aged 65 or older. The average household size was 2.12 and the average family size was 2.80.

The median age was 40.8 years. 25.2% of residents were under the age of 18; 5.7% were between the ages of 18 and 24; 26.9% were from 25 to 44; 15.5% were from 45 to 64; and 26.8% were 65 or older. The gender makeup of the city was 51.2% male and 48.8% female.

=== 2000 census ===
At the 2000 census there were 126 people in 58 households, including 36 families, in the city. The population density was 695.9 inhabitants per square mile (268.7/km^{2}). There were 65 housing units at an average density of 359.0 per square mile (138.6/km^{2}). The racial makup of the city was 80.95% White, 14.29% Native American, 0.79% from other races, and 3.97% from two or more races. Hispanic or Latino of any race were 0.79%.

Of the 58 households 22.4% had children under the age of 18 living with them, 53.4% were married couples living together, 3.4% had a female householder with no husband present, and 37.9% were non-families. 36.2% of households were one person and 17.2% were one person aged 65 or older. The average household size was 2.17 and the average family size was 2.78.

The age distribution was 20.6% under the age of 18, 2.4% from 18 to 24, 25.4% from 25 to 44, 31.0% from 45 to 64, and 20.6% 65 or older. The median age was 46 years. For every 100 females, there were 110.0 males. For every 100 females age 18 and over, there were 104.1 males.

The median household income was $18,750 and the median family income was $25,536. Males had a median income of $21,875 versus $29,250 for females. The per capita income for the city was $11,111. There were 27.0% of families and 37.1% of the population living below the poverty line, including 82.1% of under eighteens and 5.9% of those over 64.

== See also ==
- List of geographic names derived from anagrams and ananyms
