= De Smet, Idaho =

Census-designated place in Benewah County, Idaho, United States

- Census-designated place
- Location of De Smet in Benewah County, Idaho.

- Location within Idaho
- Coordinates: 47°08′28″N 116°54′41″W
- Country: United States
- State: Idaho
- County: Benewah

Area
  - Total: 0.957 sq mi (2.48 km^{2})
  - Land: 0.957 sq mi (2.48 km^{2})
  - Water: 0 sq mi (0 km^{2})
- Elevation: 2,687 ft (819 m)

Population (2020)
  - Total: 145
  - Density: 145.0/sq mi (55.98/km^{2})
- Time zone: UTC-8 (Pacific (PST))
  - Summer (DST): UTC-7 (PDT)
- ZIP code: 83824
- Area codes: 208, 986
- GNIS feature ID: 2583435

De Smet (also spelled Desmet) də SMET or dez-MET; is a census-designated place on the Coeur d'Alene Reservation in Benewah County, Idaho, United States.

As of the 2020 census, De Smet had a population of 145.

== Description ==
U.S. Route 95 passes nearby and the community is located about a mile (1.6 km) south of Tensed, which was originally also to be titled Desmet before the name was ordered to be reversed and was subsequently misspelled by the post office. Latah Creek flows between the two communities. De Smet has a post office with a ZIP code of 83824. As of the 2010 census, its population was 145, and its elevation is approximately 2,600 feet (790 m) above sea level.

== History ==
De Smet was named for the Belgian Catholic priest Pierre De Smet, a 19th-century Jesuit missionary. He worked with the Coeur d'Alène and other native peoples of western North America for most of his life, periodically returning to his chapter based in St. Louis, Missouri.

De Smet's population was estimated at 200 in 1909, and was 100 in 1960.

== Demographics ==
Population census
Year	Pop.	±% p.a.
1909	200	—
1960	100	−1.35%
2010	175	+1.13%
2020	145	−1.86%
Source: "Census of Population and Housing". Census.gov.

== Climate ==
This region has warm (but not hot) and dry summers, with no average monthly temperatures above 71.6 °F. According to the Köppen Climate Classification system, De Smet has a warm-summer Mediterranean climate, abbreviated "Csb" on climate maps.

== Education ==
There is a tribal K-8 school, associated with the Bureau of Indian Education (BIE), Coeur d'Alene Tribal School.

== See also ==
- List of census-designated places in Idaho
- Mary Immaculate School for Native Americans
- Tensed, Idaho
