= Economy of Spokane, Washington =

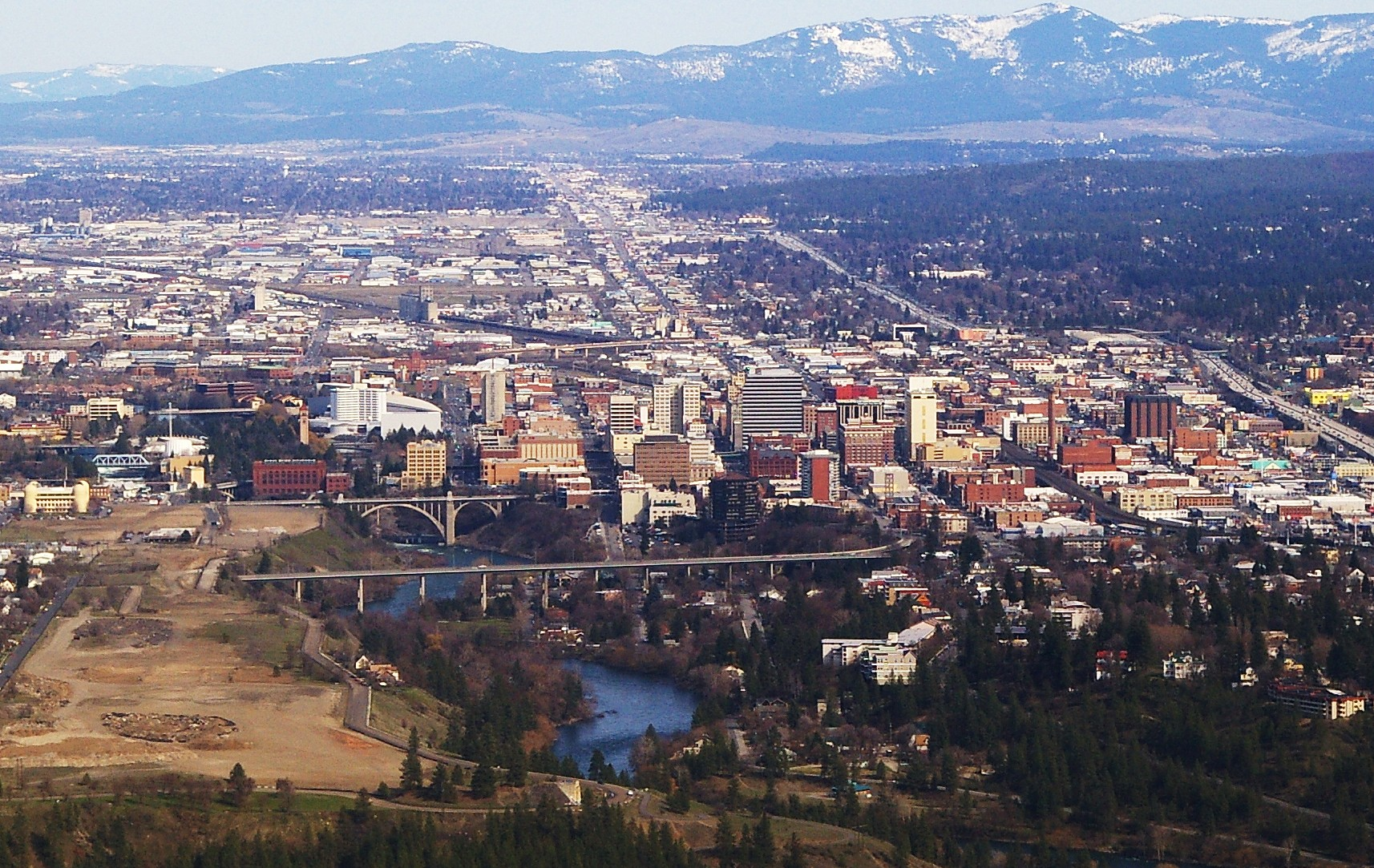
The Spokane commercial district

The economy of the Spokane metropolitan area plays a vital role as the hub for the commercial, manufacturing, and transportation center as well as the medical, shopping, and entertainment hub of the 80,000 square miles (210,000 km^{2}) Inland Northwest region. Although the two have opted not to merge into a single Metropolitan Statistical Area (MSA) yet, the Coeur d'Alene MSA has been combined by the Census Bureau into the Spokane–Coeur d'Alene combined statistical area (CSA). The CSA comprises the Spokane metropolitan area and the Coeur d'Alene metropolitan area anchored by Coeur d'Alene, Idaho. According to the U.S. Bureau of Labor Statistics, the Spokane metropolitan area has a workforce of about 287,000 people (255,000 non-farm) and an unemployment rate of 5.3 percent as of February 2020; the largest sectors for non–farm employment are education and health services, trade, transportation, and utilities, and government. The Coeur d'Alene metropolitan area has a workforce of 80,000 people and an unemployment rate of 6.8% as of June 2020; the largest sectors for non-farm employment are trade, transportation, and utilities, government, and education and health services as well as leisure and hospitality. In 2017, the Spokane–Spokane Valley metropolitan area had a gross metropolitan product of $25.5 billion while the Coeur d'Alene metropolitan area was $5.93 billion.

Spokane's economy has traditionally been natural resource based—heavily dependent on extractive products produced from farms, forests, and mines—however, the city's economy has now diversified to encompass other industries, including the technology, healthcare, and biotech sectors. Major trade in the city started with the first permanent European settlement in the Spokane area and Washington state with the fur trade, with the westward expansion and establishment of the North West Company's Spokane House in 1810. The Spokane House was the center of the fur trade between the Rockies and the Cascades for 16 years. The Spokane area is considered to be one of the most productive mining districts in North America. In the late 19th century, gold and silver were discovered in the Inland Northwest, leading to intensive development of mines in the region. After the mining rushes and associated trade ended at the turn of the 20th century, agriculture and logging became the primary influences in the Spokane economy. The expansion and growth of Spokane abruptly stopped in the 1910s and was followed by a period of population decline due to economic factors such as capital flight, low commodity prices, and loss of industry. A later stabilization of the economy came with the eventual diversification away from natural resources.

== Economic history overview ==
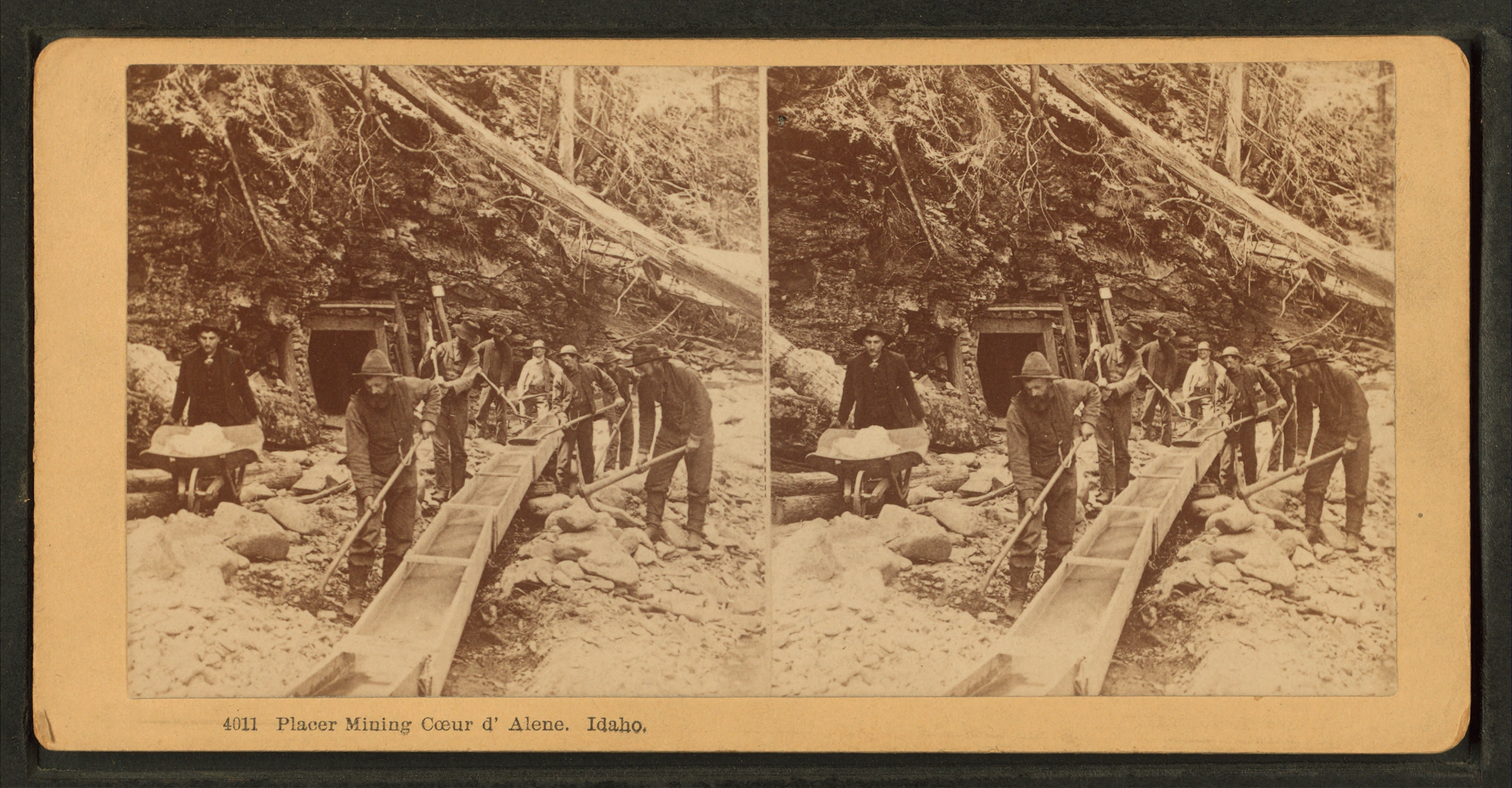
Stereoscopic image of Silver Valley placer mining in the late 1800s

=== Trade ===
In search of furs, explorer David Thompson sent out two trappers, Jacques Raphael Finlay and Finan McDonald, to construct a fur trading post on the Spokane River in Washington and trade with the local Indians. In operation from 1810 to 1826, it was run by the British North West Company and later the Hudson's Bay Company, and the post was the headquarters of the fur trade between the Rocky and Cascade mountains for 16 years.

=== Mining boom ===
The 1883 discovery of gold, silver, and lead in the Coeur d'Alene region of northern Idaho lured prospectors. The Inland Empire erupted with numerous mining rushes from 1883 to 1892. At the onset of the initial 1883 gold rush in the nearby Coeur d'Alene mining district, Spokane became popular with prospectors, offering low prices on everything "from a horse to a frying pan". It would keep this status for subsequent rushes in the region due to its trade center status and accessibility to railroad infrastructure.

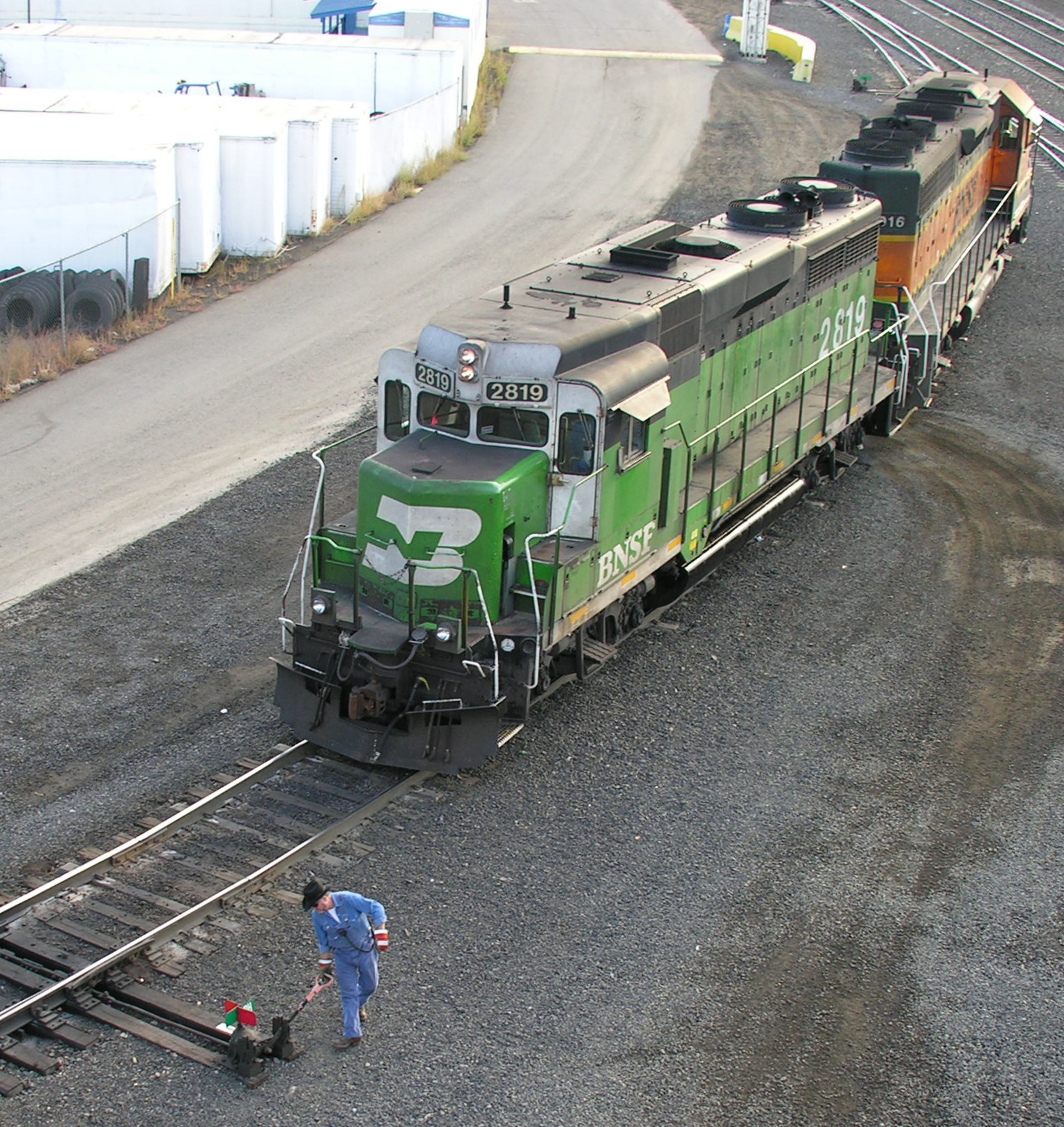
Locomotive in Spokane's classification yard

Spokane became an important rail and shipping center because of its location between mining and farming areas (namely the Silver Valley and the Palouse). After the arrival of the Northern Pacific, the Union Pacific, Great Northern, and Chicago, Milwaukee, St. Paul and Pacific railroads, Spokane became one of the most important rail centers in the western United States, being the site of four transcontinental railroads. Secretary of the Spokane chamber of commerce, John R. Reavis tells of Spokane's significance to the Inland Northwest region as an entrepôt distributing center (largely the city's raison d'être) in his 1891 Annual Report, writing:

"By reason of her geographical position and railroad connections Spokane is fitted as no other city is, or ever can be, to be the distributing center of all that country within a radius of 150 miles, and in some instances territory much farther away. There is no point 150 miles from Spokane that is not at least 225 miles from any other city of 10,000 population. We have about us a territory of 60,000 square miles in extent, to every point of which we are nearer than any other city, to every point of which we have better railroad connections and easier grades than any other city ... We have eight lines of railroad that radiate out in all directions through it, so that shipments made here in the morning can reach any point within its borders by nightfall. We have a telephone system connecting us with almost every shipping town and shipping station within its borders. Goods may be ordered, shipped and received, in most instances, within one day. Never was a city more intimately knit to its surrounding territory than Spokane, and never was one more free from a legitimate rival in trade ..."

=== Logging, forestry, and agribusiness ===
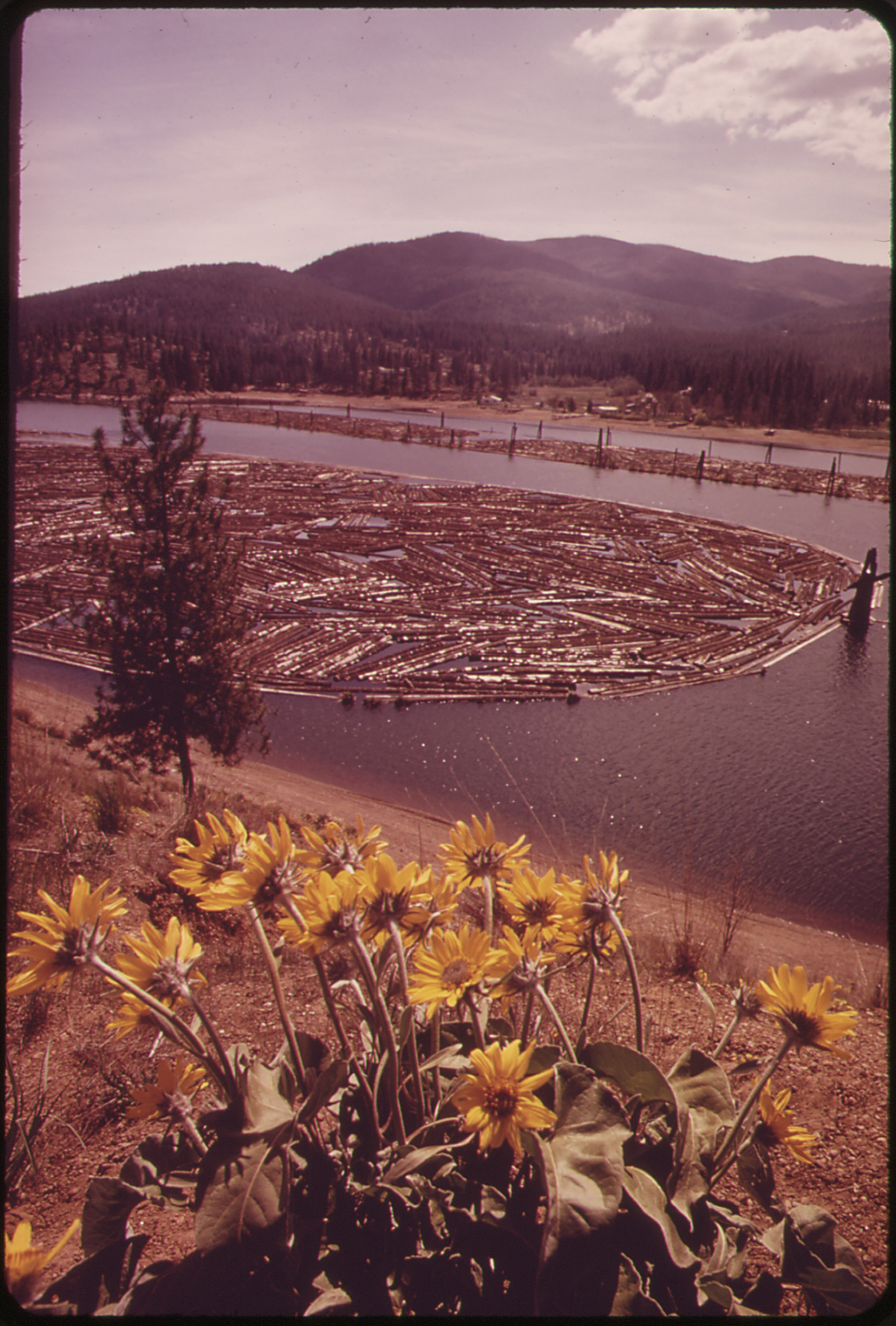
The Spokane River log boom at Post Falls in 1973

After mining declined at the turn of the 20th century, agriculture and logging became the primary influences in the Spokane economy. The lumber industry in Spokane began with the city's founding in 1871 when Downing and Scranton built Spokane's first business, a sawmill. When it became widely known after a US Geological Survey done in the 1890s that there were large quantities of white pine, a highly prized softwood, in the Coeur d’Alene Mountains, the lumber industry from the eastern US began to inventory the timberlands, acquire land and invest in facilities across much of northern Idaho. As with the mining industry, lumberjacks and millmen working in the hundreds of mills along the railroads, rivers, and lakes of northern Washington and Idaho were provisioning themselves in Spokane. In Idaho, lumber production reached its height in the late 1910s and 1920s; in 1925 there were seven lumber mills operating in the area that were producing 500 million board feet of lumber.

Spokane became a noted leader in the manufacture of doors, window sashes, blinds, and other planing mill products. The city also became noted for processing and distributing dairy and orchard products and for producing products milled from timber. By the early 20th century Spokane was primarily a commercial center rather than an industrial center.

The agricultural hinterland of the Inland Northwest was a breadbasket and was able to develop and grow further with the completion of several railroad networks as well as a highway system that began to center around the city, aiding farmers from around the region in distributing their products to market at low cost. As with mining in the late 1880s, Spokane was an important agricultural market and trade and supply center.

=== Stagnation ===
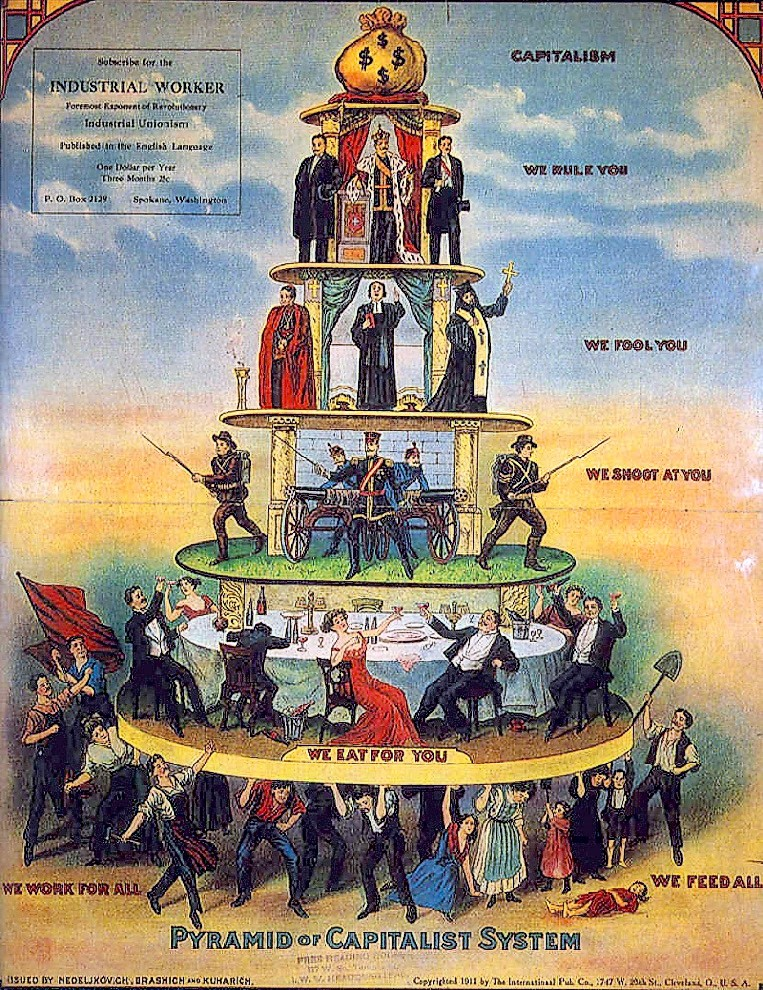
The Industrial Worker began publication in Spokane in 1909. This work was produced during the US Panic of 1910–1911

Expansion abruptly stopped in the 1910s and was followed by a period of population decline, due in large part to Spokane's slowing economy. Control of regional mines and resources became increasingly dominated by national corporations rather than local people and organizations, diverting capital outside of Spokane and decreasing growth and investment opportunities in the city.

The Inland Northwest region was heavily dependent on natural resources and extractive goods produced from mines, forests, and farms, which experienced a fall in demand. After the 1929 stock market crash and during the Great Depression, the lumber industry demand began to wane and by the mid-1930s about half the woodworkers in northern Idaho were laid off and the surviving mills were producing only 160 million board feet of lumber per year.

Federal-led development that sought to harness the power of the Columbia River resulted in hydroelectric dams, starting with the Bonneville Dam in 1938, which allowed the Pacific Northwest region to transition to new industries. When the construction of the Grand Coulee Dam was finally completed in 1942, the Northwest was designated the preferred location to mass-produce sheet aluminum to build materiel for World War II. Locally, the two aluminum plants as well as a magnesium plant brought 2,100 jobs to the Spokane area at its peak and supplied the materials to make airplanes and boats for the war effort. In 1950, Washington state accounted for half of all aluminum production in the United States. In addition to aluminum plants, the government also sited a military distribution center for the war effort, the Velox Naval Depot, in the Spokane Valley because it was believed to be inland enough to be protected from Japanese attack and because it had extensive railroad infrastructure already in place.

=== Economy diversification ===
The growth witnessed in the late 1970s and early 1980s was interrupted by another U.S. recession in 1981, in which silver, timber, and farm prices dropped. The period of decline for the city lasted into the 1990s and was also marked by a loss of many steady family-wage jobs in the manufacturing sector. In 2000, Kaiser Aluminum, the area's largest industrial employer shuttered the Mead Works plant. Although this was a tough period, Spokane's economy had started to benefit from some measure of economic diversification; growing companies such as Key Tronic and other research, marketing, and assembly plants for technology companies helped lessen Spokane's dependence on natural resources.

Mining, forestry, and agribusiness continue to be important to the local and regional economy, but Spokane's economy has diversified to include other industries, including the high-tech and biotech sectors. Spokane is still trying to make the transition to a more service-oriented economy in the face of a less prominent manufacturing sector. Developing the city's strength in the medical and health sciences fields has seen some success, resulting in the expansion of the University District with University of Washington (first class in 2008) and Washington State University medical school (established 2015) branches. The opening of the River Park Square Mall in 1999 served as a catalyst and sparked a downtown rebirth that included the renovation of many derelict historic buildings and the expansion of the Spokane Convention Center in 2006.

== Head offices ==
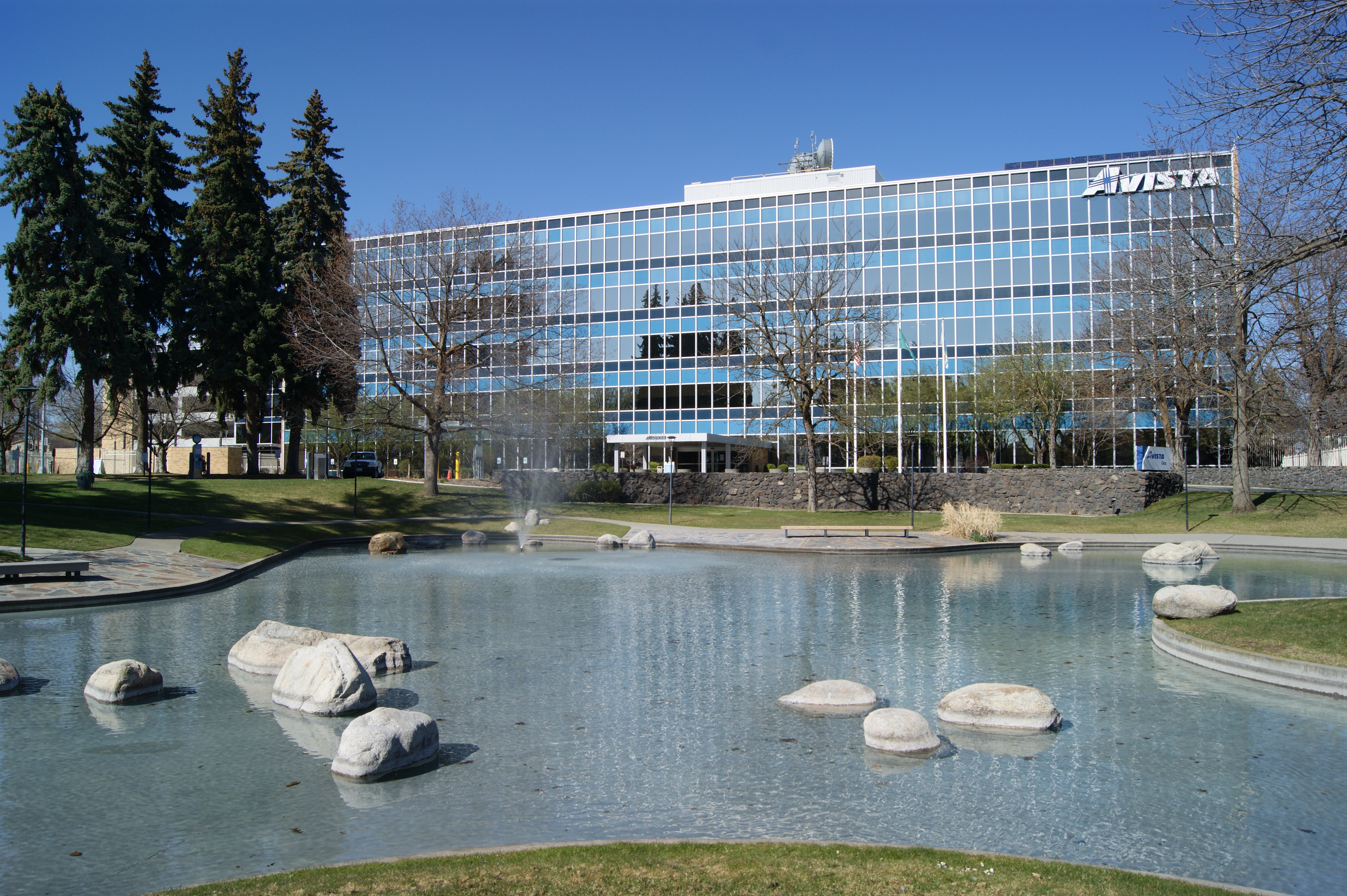
Avista Utilities offices

Spokane and its metropolitan area is the headquarters to some notable companies, such as Fortune 1000 company PotlatchDeltic, which operates as a real estate investment trust (REIT) and owns and manages timberlands located in Arkansas, Idaho, Minnesota, and Oregon. Potlatch spin off company, Clearwater Paper is a pulp and paper product manufacturer. Also, computer equipment manufacturer Key Tronic, micro-car maker, Commuter Cars, gold mining company Gold Reserve, newspaper publisher Cowles Publishing Company, local investor-owned utility, Avista Utilities, steel manufacturer SCAFCO wholesale hardware distributor, Jensen Distribution Services, and marine equipment manufacturer, EZ Loader Boat Trailers, supermarkets Rosauers Supermarkets, Yoke's Fresh Market, and supermarket food distributor, URM Stores have their head offices in Spokane. Avista Corporation, the holding company of Avista Utilities, is the only company in Spokane that has been listed in the Fortune 500, ranked 299 on the list in 2002.

Other company headquarters in the Spokane metropolitan area include the technology companies Itron and Telect in Liberty Lake, Washington, computer game developer Cyan Worlds in Mead, Washington. Across the state border in Idaho, Buck Knives has its head offices in Post Falls, Idaho, Empire Airlines in Hayden, Idaho, and Hecla Mining and Canada-based restaurant Pita Pit (US operations) have their offices in Coeur d'Alene.

== Prominent industries ==
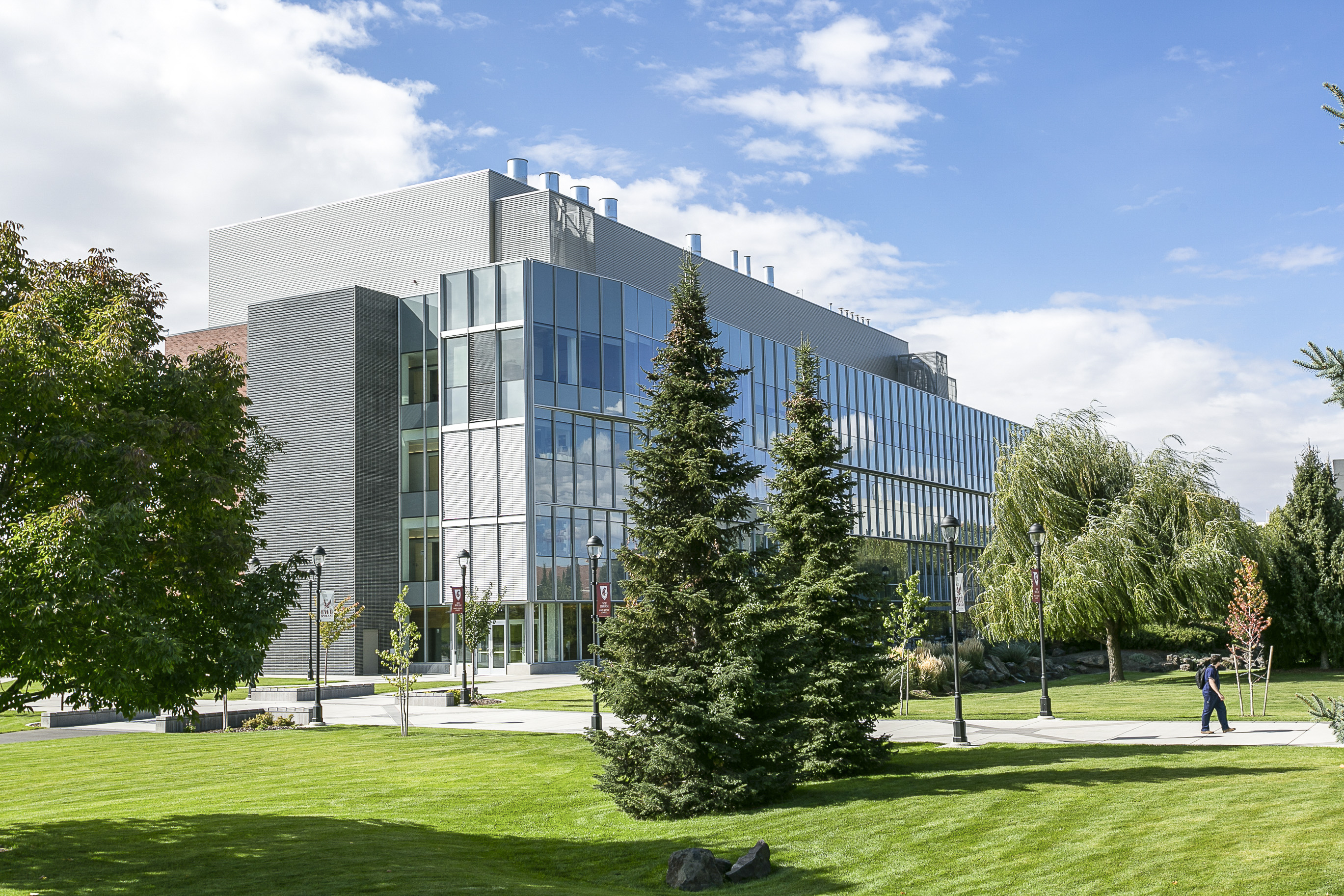
Elson S. Floyd College of Medicine: Educational services and healthcare are the leading industries in Spokane

From 2005 to 2007, the leading industries in Spokane for the employed population 16 years and older were educational services, and health care, and social assistance, 25 percent, and retail trade, 12 percent. As of February 2020, the largest sectors for non–farm employment are education and health services, trade, transportation, and utilities, and government.

The top five employers in Spokane are the State of Washington, Spokane Public Schools, Providence Sacred Heart Medical Center and Children's Hospital, the 92nd Air Refueling Wing, and Spokane County. Sizable companies with locations in the Spokane region include, BlueStar Technologies, Ciena, Cisco, F5, Goodrich Corporation, Honeywell, Itron, Kaiser Aluminum, Telect, and Triumph Composite Systems.

Among the top employers in Kootenai County include Kootenai Health (1,825 employees), Coeur d’Alene Tribal Casino (1,400 employees), and Coeur d’Alene School District (1,250 employees).

Other industries in Spokane include professional and business services, manufacturing, and mining, logging, and construction which employed 26,000, 18,000, and 14,000 respectively in February 2020. Furthermore, all branches of the U.S. armed forces are represented in Spokane County. The largest military facility in the area is Fairchild Air Force Base.

=== Agriculture ===
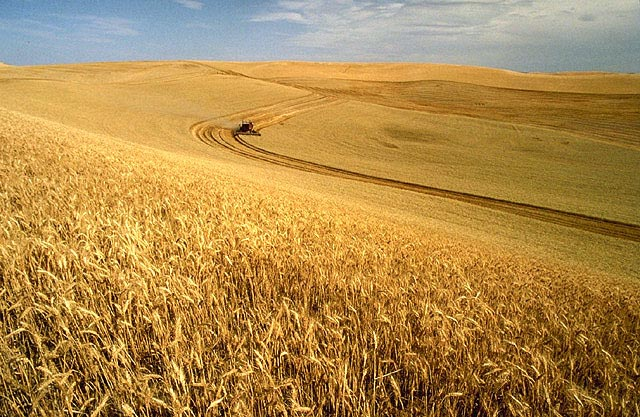
Wheat farming on the Palouse, Idaho

According to Greater Spokane Inc., Spokane County has over 2,500 farms (second highest in the state), and the processing of food in Spokane generates $566 million in revenue. Agriculture activities generate $117 million in annual economic impact and support 1,576 jobs on over 7,000 farms and ranches which produced $1 billion of product which generated an estimated $5 billion impact in Spokane and the surrounding counties. As of February 2020, the agricultural sector employed about 32,000 people.

The surrounding counties, especially to the south, is a productive agricultural region known as the Palouse. The Inland Northwest region has also long been associated with farming, especially wheat production where it is one of the largest wheat producing regions in the United States. Agricultural potential and productivity depends greatly on a region's soil qualities which in turn is dependent on the climate and amount and timing of rainfall events. The Inland Empire, with its cool, snowy and rainy winters, rainy spring, and hot and dry summers lends itself to a wide variety of farming. The four major producing counties on the Palouse are neighboring Whitman, Lincoln, and Adams counties and nearby Grant county. Whitman County ranks as the highest producing wheat county in the nation and ranks second in barley. Today, a large share of the wheat produced in the region is shipped to Far East markets. Agriculture in Spokane is very important to the overall economy, and according to Wayne Rasmussen, continued future success of this sector will depend on efficient farm management and support of agricultural research and development at regional universities as well as support to local farmers with information for sound decision making regarding production, financing, and marketing. Washington State University operates a Spokane County Extension that has the goal to “promote quality of life and advance economic well-being through fostering inquiry, learning and the application of research.” The Spokane Ag Expo is hosted at the Spokane Convention Center annually and is one of the largest trade show of its type in the nation.

There is also a viticulture and craft brewing scene featuring a number of award-winning wineries and microbreweries in the Spokane area. With over 800 wineries, Washington state ranks second in wine production in the country. With three quarters of the hops in the United States being produced in the Yakima Valley and new varieties being bred on an ongoing basis, there is a growing craft brewery and microbrewery scene in the Pacific Northwest. The largest brewery in Spokane is the No-Li Brewhouse.

=== Mining and forestry products ===
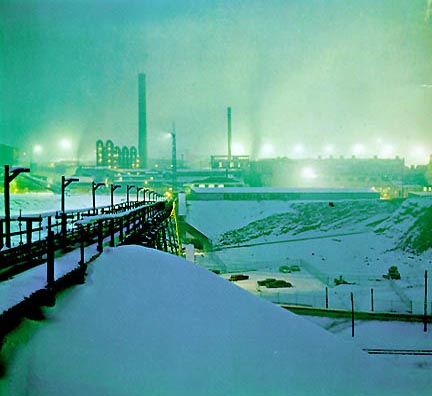
Bunker Hill smelter in Smelterville, Idaho in the 1970s

The mining districts of northern Idaho are still considered among the most productive in North America. The Coeur d’Alene district of Shoshone County (also known as Silver Valley) in northern Idaho has produced more silver than any other mining district in the United States, and is historically one of the top three silver districts in the world in total silver produced. The district competes with Potosi in Bolivia and Pachuca-Real del Monte in Mexico for the title of the greatest silver district, each having produced more than a billion troy ounces of silver. Mining company Gold Reserve Inc. is headquartered in Spokane and Hecla Mining, the owner of the Lucky Friday mine in Mullan, Idaho is headquartered in Coeur d'alene. A mining policy advocacy group representing the mining industry and interests in the US and Canada, the American Exploration & Mining Association is located in Spokane Valley. They purport their annual meeting is the second-largest annual mining convention in the United States.

Forestry management and products still have an influence in the area. The biggest such firm in Spokane, PotlatchDeltic, invests and manages timberlands and manufacture wood products. The company had a market capitalization of over $3 billion and was the eighth-largest timber company in the U.S. in 2017. The company manages 1.9 million acres of timberlands primarily in Idaho, Minnesota, and the southeastern United States and does so with sustainable forestry practices as required to be certified by the Sustainable Forestry Initiative. Also in the forestry products industry, Clearwater Paper, is a spin-off of Potlatch Corp that makes tissue and paperboard products. With an annual revenue of $1.9 billion, the company claims to be the biggest supplier of private or store-label tissue products to grocery outlets in the US.

=== Manufacturing ===
The manufacturing sector employs 18,000 people in greater Spokane or about nine percent of the employment. Wood and food processing, printing and publishing, primary metal refining and fabrication, electrical and computer equipment, and transportation equipment are leaders in the manufacturing sector. The combination of inexpensive power from the Bonneville Dam, and the railroad and Interstate Highway system have provided the city a good manufacturing base.

The knife manufacturer, Buck Knives is the most recognizable brand name that has manufacturing facilities in the Spokane–Coeur d'alene area. They relocated the head office and factory from southern California to Post Falls, Idaho reportedly due to high energy costs. Key Tronic in Spokane Valley is among the ten largest contract manufacturers providing electronic manufacturing services in the US. The company offers full product design or assembly of a wide variety of household goods and electronic products such as keyboards, printed circuit board assembly, plastic molding, thermometers, toilet bowl cleaners, satellite tracking systems, etc. Electronic manufacturing services companies produce the components that are designed in the more recognizable tech “creative hubs”; computer systems design is among the top three sources of advanced industries’ employment and growth in the city. According to Greater Spokane Incorporated, Spokane is the fifth largest aerospace manufacturing center and the second largest in the state of Washington with over 8,000 people employed in aerospace production. The manufacturers in Spokane are mostly tier 2 and tier 3 level suppliers which produce subassembly parts to the larger and less specialized tier 1 suppliers.

=== Transportation and distribution ===
The city's historic status as a regional city and a distribution center for goods and people is still important to the economy. Mass transportation throughout the Spokane area is provided by the Spokane Transit Authority (STA), which operates a fleet of 156 buses. Its service area covers roughly 248 square miles (640 km^{2}) and reaches 85 percent of the county's population. Extension of Spokane Transit Authority service into Idaho, mainly an hourly express bus to and from Coeur d'Alene, was originally proposed as part of the 2015 "STA Moving Forward" ballot measure, the ballot measure eventually passed and service is expected to commence in 2025. Intercity rail and bus service is provided by Amtrak and Greyhound via the Spokane Intermodal Center. The city is a stop for Amtrak's Empire Builder on its way to and from Chicago's Union Station en route to Seattle and Portland. Spokane is still a major railway junction for the BNSF Railway and the Union Pacific Railroad and is the western terminus for the Montana Rail Link.

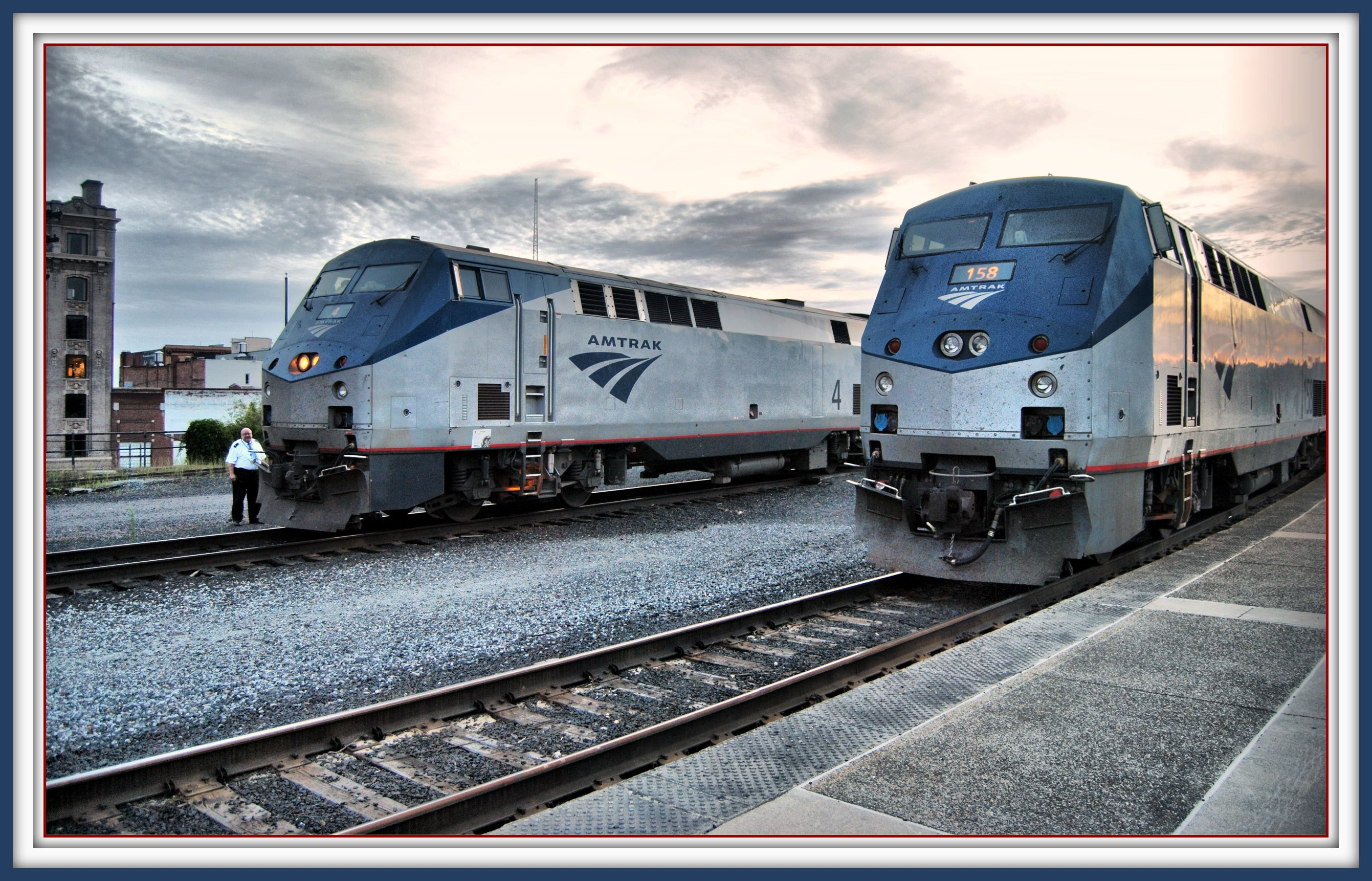
Amtrak's Empire Builders at Spokane, WA

Spokane, eastern Washington and northern Idaho are also served by air through the Spokane International Airport at Geiger Field (GEG). Spokane International Airport is the second largest airport in the state of Washington and is recognized by the Federal Aviation Administration as a small hub. The airport recorded 4,112,784 passengers in 2019 and processed 70,000 tons of air cargo in 2019 which would rank it in the top 50 in the United States in terms of cargo handling. A facility near the airport serves as the USPS sectional center facility. In 2019, the airport received federal funding from the USDOT to build a short rail connection to the airport and an onload/offload freight hub connecting the railroad system to the road system. This will enable the more seamless and efficient transportation of goods and promote economic growth; currently all goods are transferred from road to rail at the Yardley railroad facility in Spokane Valley.

Many businesses use Spokane as a regional distribution center. Not far from the airport is an Amazon.com fulfillment center on the Spokane's West Plains that opened in February 2020. Spokane retailers' cooperative, URM Stores is a member of the Retailer Owned Food Distributors & Associates that serves Idaho, Montana, Oregon, and Washington; ROFDA's focus is to create benefits for the independent retail grocer member-owners through sharing information; leveraging collective resources and developing tools to assist them in competing against big-box stores. Hardware distributor Jensen Distribution Services ships nearly 70,000 items to 11 western states from its plant on the West Plains. As of February 2020, the trade, transportation, and utilities industries employed about 47,000 people in the area.

=== Tourism and hospitality ===
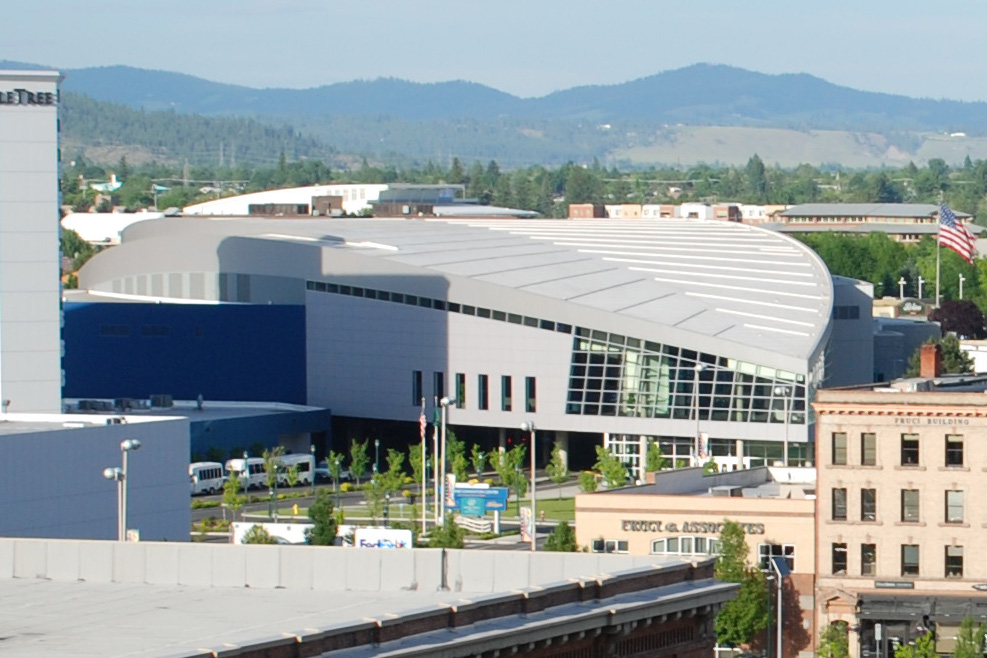
The convention center is a source of tourism

As the metropolitan center of the Inland Northwest as well as southern British Columbia and Alberta, the city serves as a commercial, manufacturing, transportation, medical, shopping, and entertainment hub. The city is also the hub for the service industries, and the wholesale and retail trade center of the 80,000 square miles (210,000 km^{2}) Inland Northwest region. Retailers in the city, such as destination big box or specialty stores such as an Apple store, bring in visitors from the smaller communities in eastern Washington and Idaho that don't have these stores because the customer base would be too small to support them. Malls such as the River Park Square Mall and NorthTown Mall, and Spokane Valley Mall make it possible to shop more efficiently, visiting many stores in a short amount of time.

Spokane has historically been a destination for regional conventions and expositions because of the abundant hotel space it had. Recent expansions of square footage at the Spokane Convention Center and other convention space and increased hotel capacity (especially the connected Davenport Grand Hotel) have led to more interest in Spokane as a destination for conventions and other events. With the Spokane Convention Center, Spokane has a large amount of exhibition space for a city of its size and is able to contend to host some of the largest conventions and events that need square footage of over 100,000 square feet.

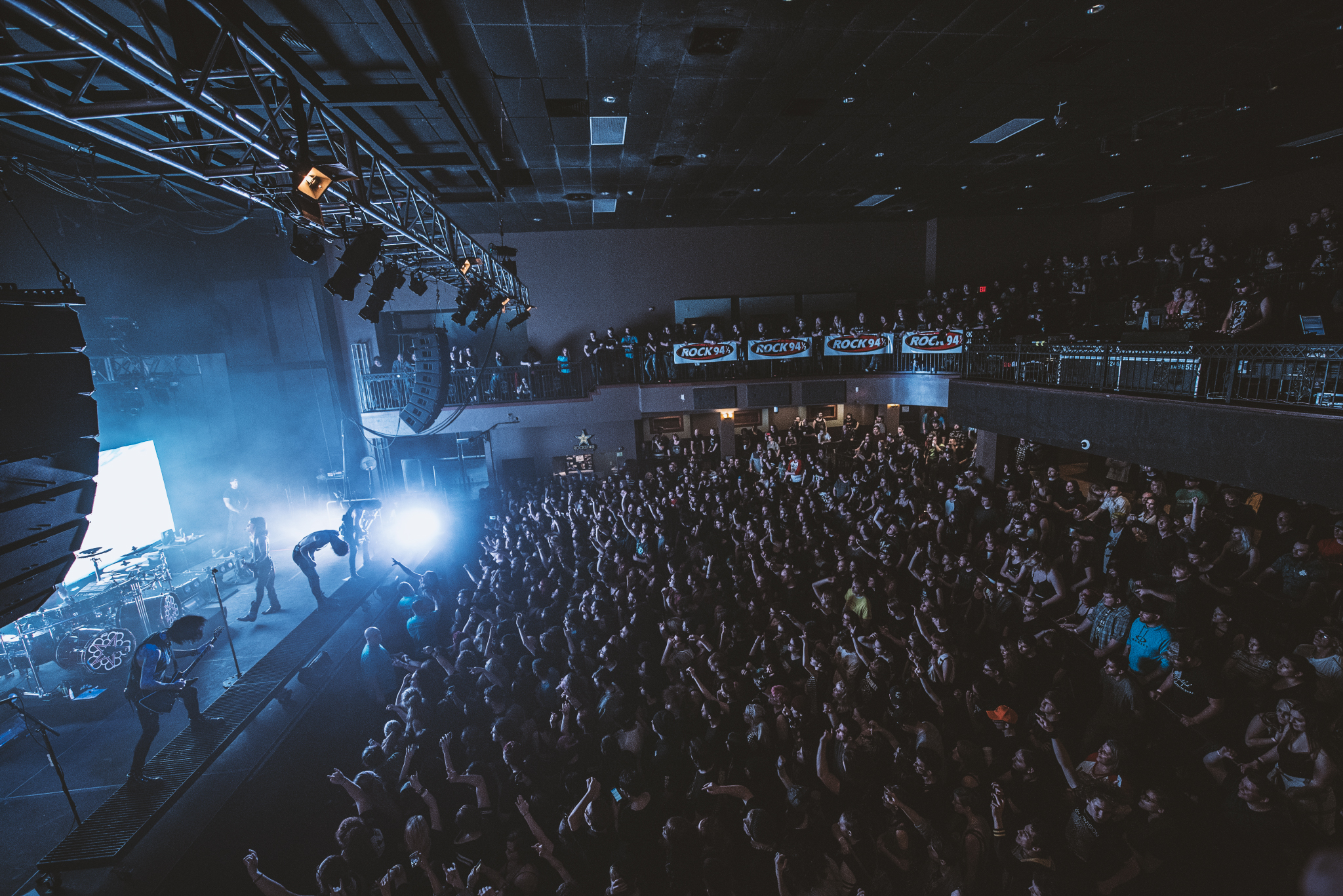
Concert at the Knitting Factory

The hosting of sporting events has become a stimulus for the lodging industry and the downtown department stores, boutique shops, restaurants and bars nearby the venues. In 2019, hosting activities resulted in an estimated 55 events with 45,000 visiting athletes booking 61,000 hotel rooms and generating $64 million in direct spending in the local community. The biggest sports event hosted in Spokane history was the 2007 U.S. Figure Skating Championships. The event set an attendance record, selling nearly 155,000 tickets and passing the previous mark of 125,000 set by the 2002 United States Figure Skating Championships in Los Angeles. The city would later be selected to host the 2010 championships. With the addition of the Spokane's sportsplex in 2021, the Podium, the city hopes to attract bigger sporting events. The Sportsplex is designed to be reconfigured to meet a variety of different sporting events and has a six lane, 200-meter indoor hydraulically banked track which can also hold up to 17 volleyball courts, ten basketball courts or 21 wrestling mats. The hospitality industry that caters to these visitors employs about 24,000 people or 2.5 percent of jobs in the Spokane metropolitan area.

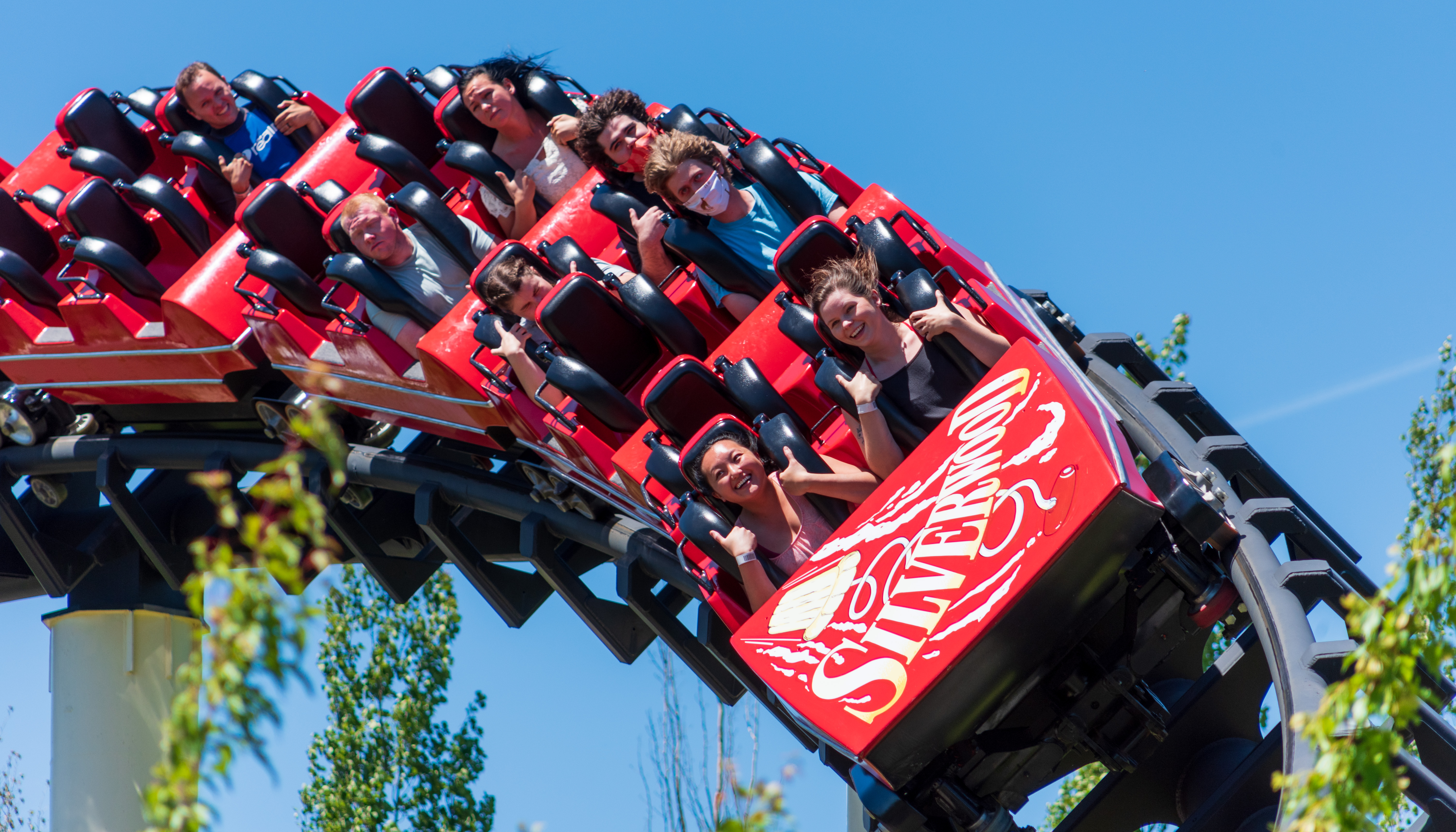
Corkscrew at Silverwood Theme Park

Due in part because Spokane is the largest city between Seattle and Minneapolis and because it lies along the route to many regional attractions, tourism is on the rise in the area. Local events such as the annual Bloomsday race and Hoopfest bring in people from around the region to take part. some Spokane can be a "base camp" for activities such as river rafting, camping, and other activities in the region. The town of Airway Heights is a destination for gaming because of the presence of two casino hotels, the Northern Quest Resort & Casino and the Spokane Tribe Casino. The casinos and other entertainment and performing arts venues such as the Spokane Arena, First Interstate Center for the Arts, Knitting Factory, Fox Theater, and Bing Crosby Theater host concert tours or other traveling performers which bring in locals and out-of-towners.

Across the state in Idaho, tourism is the main driver of growth in the community. Tourism and hospitality related jobs employed over 10,000 people in north Idaho in 2010. The resort town of Coeur d'alene is a major tourist attraction for the metropolitan area, being at the heart of north Idaho's scenic Lake Country where water sports, fishing, sun bathing, and other lake recreation is popular. In addition to the natural attractions like the Coeur d'Alene City Park and Beach, McEuen Park, and Tubbs Hill, the Coeur d'alene area has two major resorts on the lake, the Coeur d'Alene Resort and the WorldMark Arrow Point resort directly across the lake in Harrison, Idaho, the Coeur d'Alene Casino in Worley, Idaho, and the Pacific Northwest's largest theme park in the Silverwood Theme Park in Athol, Idaho. There are three major ski resorts in located in north Idaho, Silver Mountain Resort in Kellogg, Lookout Pass Ski and Recreation Area at Lookout Pass near Mullan, and Schweitzer Mountain Ski Resort in Sandpoint and two ski resorts in northeastern Washington, Mount Spokane Ski and Snowboard Park north of Spokane and 49 Degrees North Ski Area in Chewelah.

=== Energy and technology ===
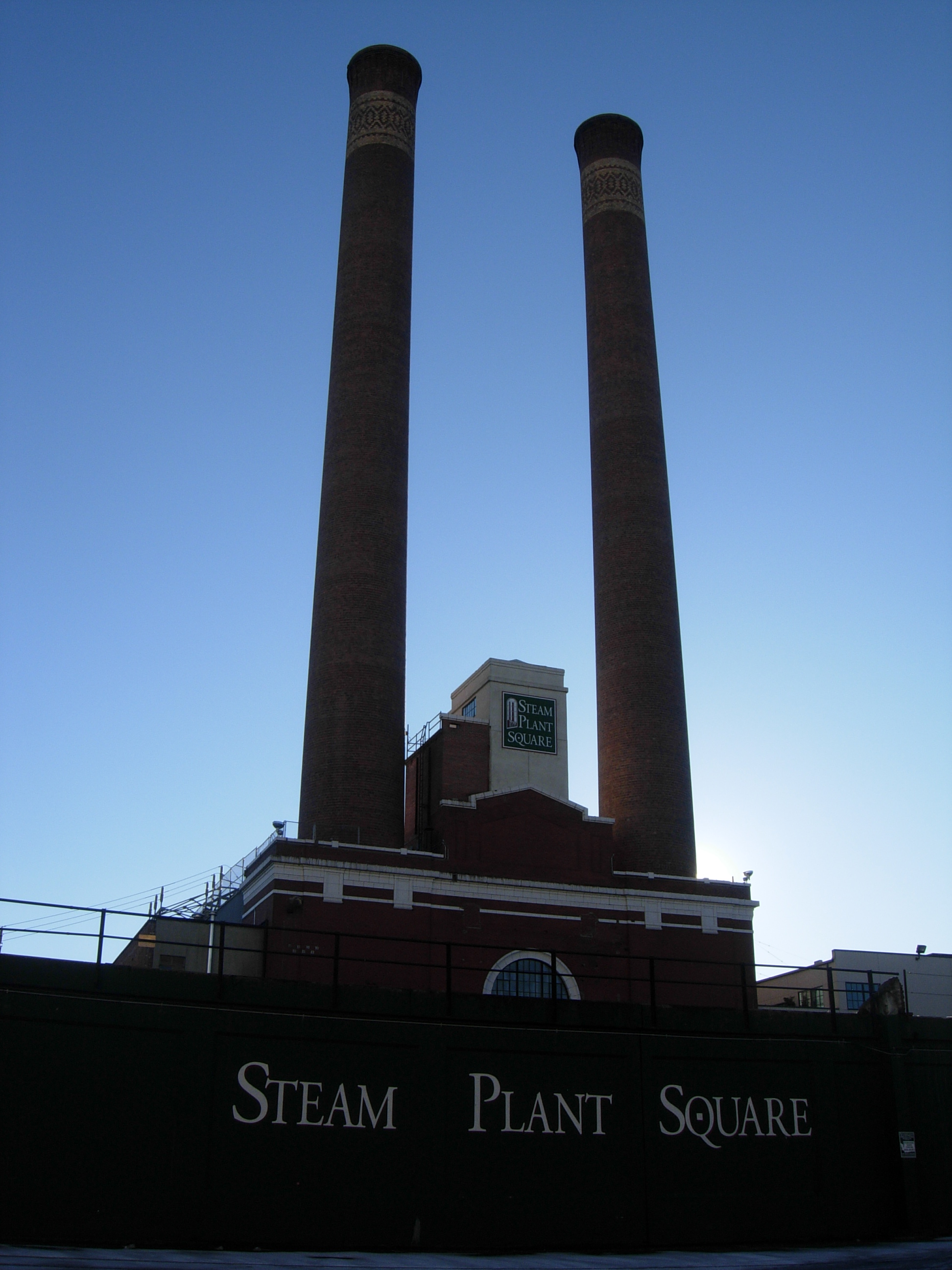
Avista acquired and operated the Central Steam Plant until 1986.

Although not a nationally competitive metro area in the technology sector, in the city it has grown at a steady pace. Utilities and technologies related to utilities especially have a role in the local economy. Avista, an investor-owned utility founded in 1889 as the Washington Water Power Company has always been the main power utility for Spokane and much of eastern Washington. It is one of the largest private employers in the city. and its holding company is the only company in Spokane to have had a Fortune 500 listing in the past. The company serves 370,000 electric and about 330,000 natural gas customers across their service territory in eastern Washington and northern Idaho. In addition to being a utility, the company has always tried to branch out into other industries and has had a role in starting a few other notable business in Spokane such as Itron and Engie Impact (founded as a subsidiary called Advantage IQ and formerly Ecova prior to its sale to GDF Suez). Both spin off companies are involved in the clean energy industry which is experiencing a growing trend in the region.

Itron is a technology company that provides solutions that measure, manage, and analyze energy and water use including standard and IoT smart meters and software and services to electric, gas, and water utilities worldwide.

=== Healthcare ===
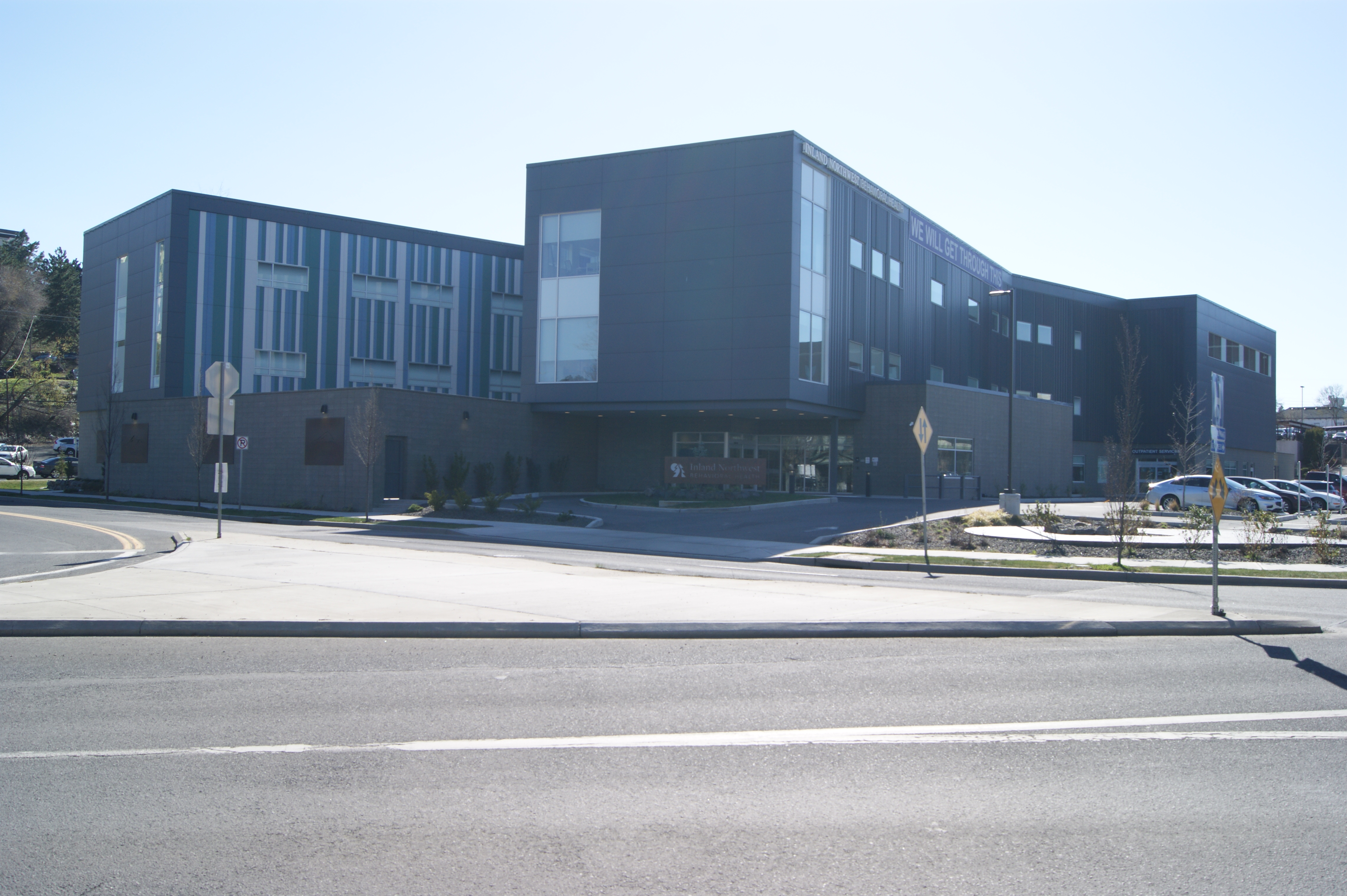
Inland Northwest Behaviorial Health, Spokane provides specialized medical care for the region.

The health-care industry is a large and increasingly important industry in Spokane; the city provides specialized care to many patients from the surrounding Inland Northwest and as far north as the Canada–US border. The Spokane area has six major hospitals, four of which are full-service facilities. The city's health-care needs are served primarily by non-profit Renton-based Providence Health & Services and non-profit Tacoma-based Multicare Health System, which run the two biggest hospitals, Sacred Heart Medical Center, and Deaconess Hospital, respectively.

Sacred Heart Medical Center houses the Providence Spokane Heart Institute which retains specialized physicians with expertise that encompass all aspects of cardiovascular care and work to enhance and pioneer new diagnostic testing, medications, interventions and surgical techniques and hence are referred difficult cases from elsewhere in the region. The hospital also has one of ten “special pathogens units” in the US with the federal certifications to treat people with highly infectious diseases and is equipped with the staff and resources to operate a level II trauma center, the only such center in the Inland Northwest; Seattle's Harborview Medical Center operates the only Level I trauma center in the state. Other specialty care hospitals include the Shriners Hospitals for Children - Spokane, Mann-Grandstaff VA Medical Center, the St. Luke's Rehabilitation Institute, Inland Northwest Behavioral Health, and the Eastern State Hospital.

Healthcare and social assistance is the fastest growing industry in Spokane County and employs over 46,000 people. The University of Washington has a satellite medical school as part of its WWAMI program in partnership with Gonzaga University. The WSU Spokane Elson S. Floyd College of Medicine in the University District was created five years after the passage of the Affordable Care Act in 2015 to help alleviate a physician shortage in rural and eastern Washington using a community-based approach. The presence of the medical schools have increased the presence of private firms specializing in research and development in biotechnology. The chamber of commerce in Spokane has identified health care as the biggest economic driver for the local economy and presents the biggest opportunity for growth and impact in the future. There are hopes for increased health and life sciences research and innovation, commercialization and business development resulting from collaboration in the University District.

== Economic development ==
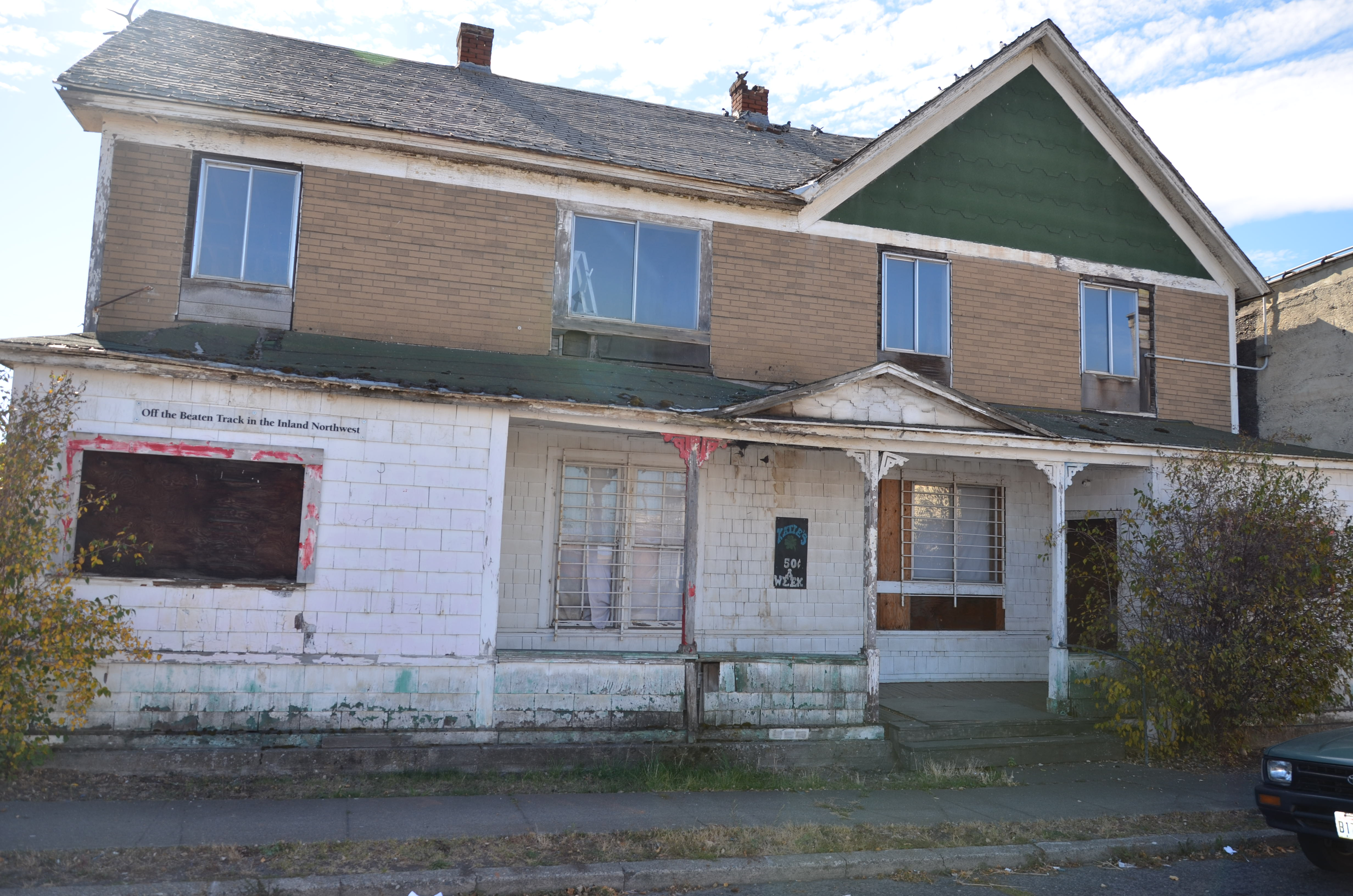
House that has fallen into disrepair in economically depressed Hillyard

Despite diversification to new industries, Spokane's economy has struggled in recent decades. The city faces challenges such as a scarcity of high-paying jobs, pockets of poverty, and areas of high crime. Spokane was ranked the #1 "Worst City For Jobs" in America in both 2012 and 2015, while also ranking #4 in 2014. A 2017 study conducted by a local investment firm found that the Spokane-Coeur d'Alene area had lost publicly traded companies at a rate greater than other metropolitan areas of comparable size. The study indicated the area had lost eight public traded companies with a market capitalization of at least $25 million since 2012, the most of any of the 31 areas surveyed, which all had populations between 600,000 and 900,000 people. Additionally, Forbes named Spokane the "Scam Capital of America" in 2009 due to widespread business fraud. Trends of fraud were noted as far back as 1988, again in 2002, and continuing through 2011.

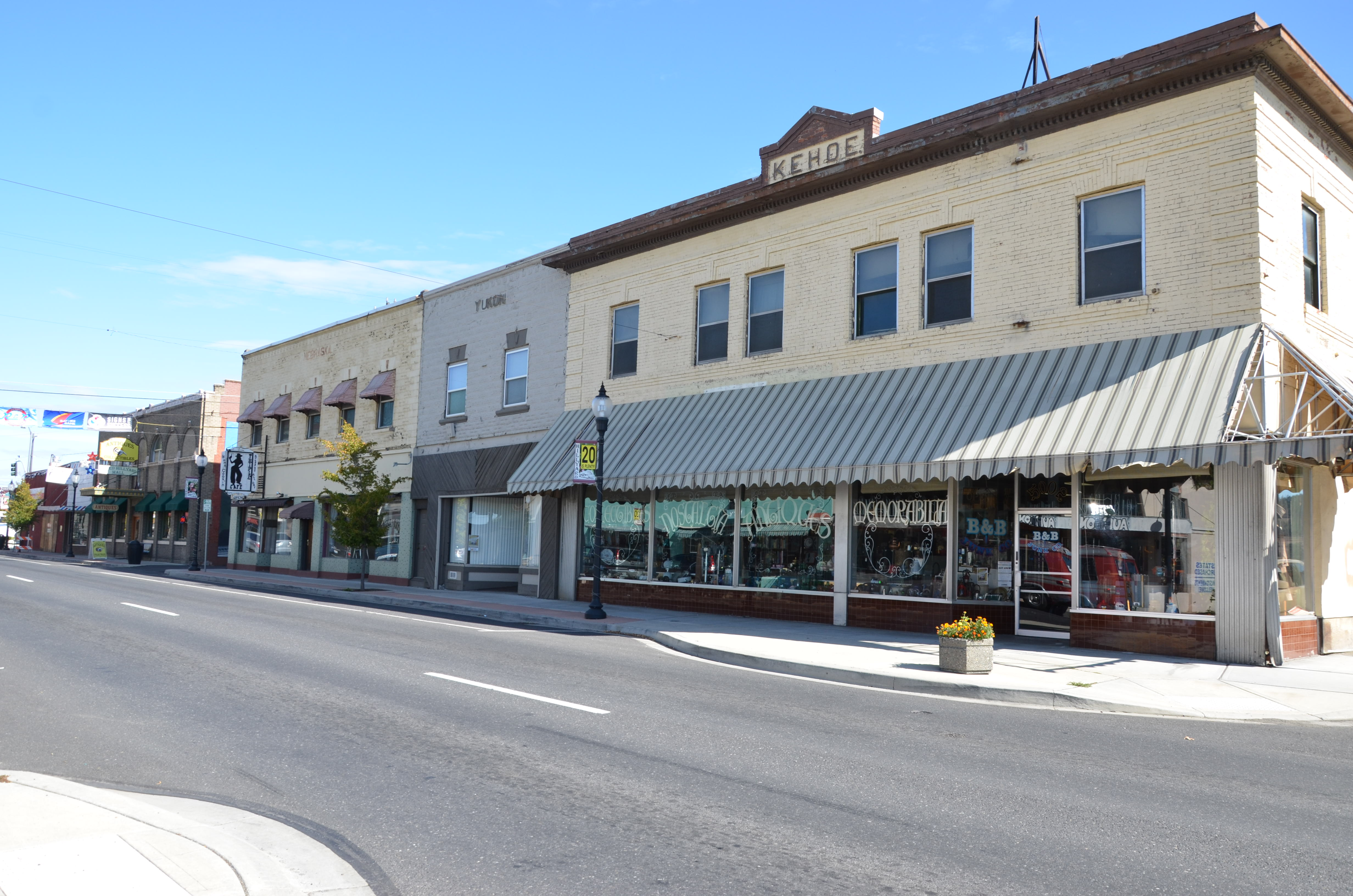
Market Street in Hillyard is expected to develop with the completion of the North Spokane Corridor

Economic development in the Spokane area primarily focuses on promoting the following industries: manufacturing (especially aerospace manufacturing), health sciences, professional services, information science and technology, finance and insurance as well as clean technology, and digital media. The local and state government are undertaking steps to develop the economy of the Spokane region. At the local level there is the Spokane Area Economic Development Council, which works with businesses to locate and utilize local and state business incentives. Also, advocating for regional economic growth in workforce, industry, manufacturing, public policy, and healthcare is Greater Spokane Incorporated, a joint organization consisting of the former Chamber of Commerce and the former Economic Development Council. There is also the typical patchwork of member business associations and improvement districts such as the Downtown Spokane Partnership and the East Spokane Business Association that work in conjunction with the city to pool their resources to enhance services and make improvements to the public or private infrastructure that help create a vibrant business climate as well as cooperatively promote business and advocate on city policy matters pertinent to them. In addition to these traditional economic development mechanisms, there has been the addition of the City of Spokane Targeted Investment Pilot (TIP) program, which aims to use a significant portion of city neighborhood development funds and focus them on a single, visible and important business corridor to transform and revitalize it by reconstructing and updating infrastructure such as streets, sidewalks, trees and landscaping, intersections, and lighting, etc., spurring further private investment. The TIP is currently part of the local government's “Centers and Corridors” growth and development strategy and part of the City of Spokane Comprehensive Plan, which focuses growth on mixed use city centers, districts, or neighborhoods. The East Sprague District was the first corridor selected for this program and has been met with some praise. Innovate Washington, a business incubator seeks to help and develop Spokane companies for success.

A number of companies have located or relocated to the Spokane area, drawn by the easy access to raw materials and lower operating costs, such as cheap hydroelectric power including Buck Knives from San Diego. The city maybe benefitting and be able to capitalize on a growing trend of IT firms moving from major urban areas to smaller ones to reduce job stresses like increasing costs of living, labor shortages, and long commutes.

In an effort to further attract companies, area community and business leaders created the "Terabyte Triangle", a sizable area downtown with high bandwidth fiber optic infrastructure in many buildings and wireless connectivity. Spokane's downtown was the site of a 100-block wireless "HotZone" network—one of the largest of its kind in the country, which was seen as symbolic of its dedication to the development of technological opportunities and resources. In 2010, the HotZone was falling into disrepair but local firms have stepped in to continue its operation.

== See also ==
- Economy of Washington (state)
- Economy of Idaho
