= Economy of Washington =

Economy of Washington may refer to:

- Economy of Washington (state)
- Economy of Washington, D.C.
