= Tubbs Hill =

Natural area in Coeur dAlene, Idaho, US

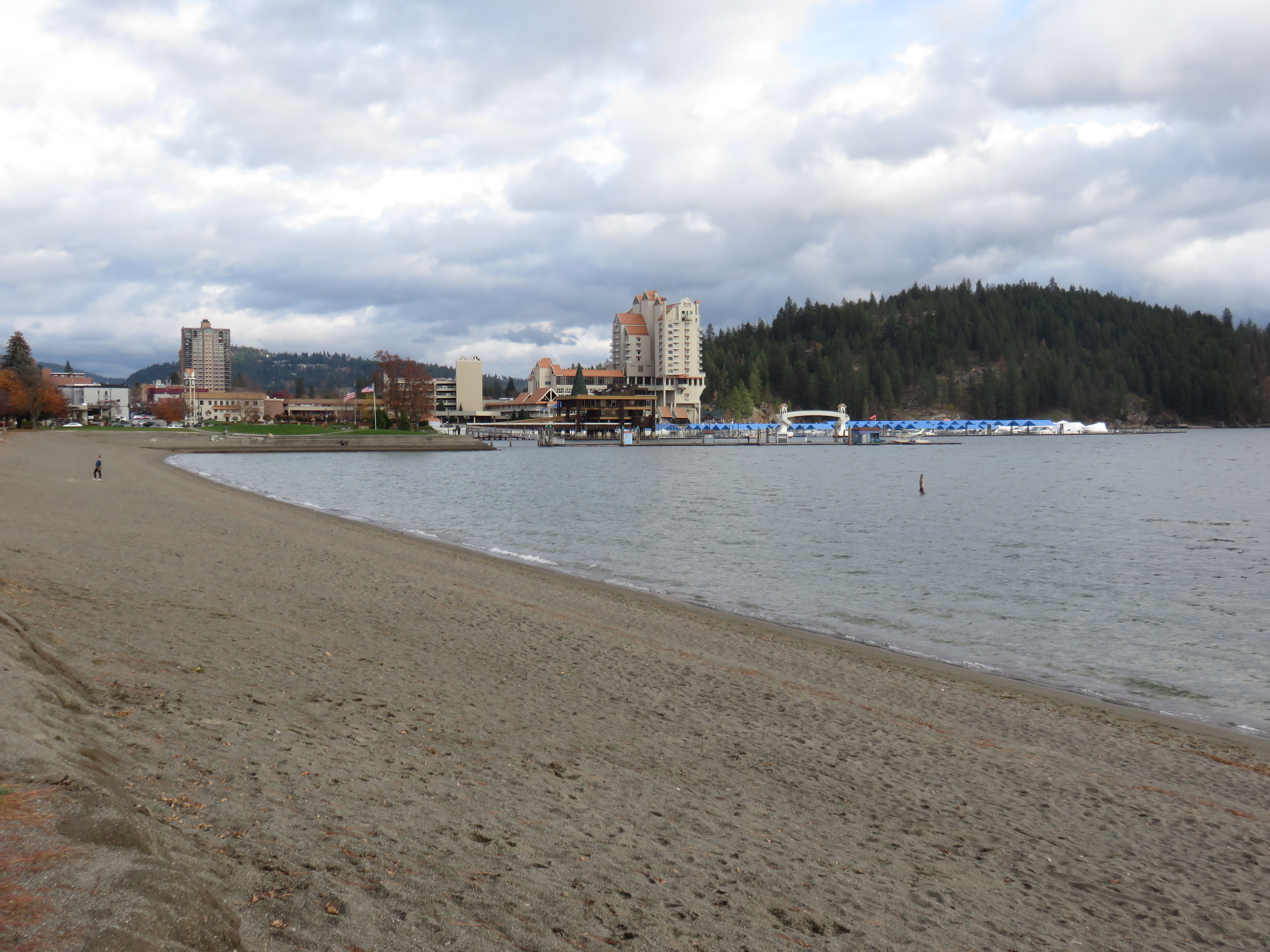
- Tubbs Hill from City Beach
- Interactive map of Tubbs Hill
- Type: Urban park
- Location: Coeur d'Alene, Idaho, U.S.
- Coordinates: 47°40′13″N 116°46′54″W
- Area: 165 acres (0.67 km^{2})
- Operator: Friends of Tubbs Hill
- Visitors: about 150,000 annually
- Status: Open year round (daily, 5 am to 11 pm)
- Website: TubbsHill.org

The Tubbs Hill Natural Area is a 165-acre (0.67 km^{2}) public park and natural area in Coeur d'Alene, Idaho. The park is located on a peninsula, with Lake Coeur d'Alene bordering the park on its west, south, and east sides and McEuen Park to the north with its main entrance and trail head at 210 South 3rd Street. An additional trail head is located at the southern terminus of 10th Street. The park's main attraction is the 2.2-mile (3.5 km) interpretive trail that takes visitors past vantage points and natural and historical sites; the trip takes roughly 52 minutes to complete. Other activities such as climbing, cliff jumping, kayaking, fishing, sunbathing, bird watching and flower viewing are also popular.

Precambrian schist and gneiss generally make up the almost solid rock formation, with topsoil depth rarely exceeding 5 inches (130 mm) deep. Despite the shallow soil depth impacting the health of the fragile ecosystem of the park, plant life is abundant and there are dense understories in areas; ponderosa pine and Douglas fir are the most common trees observed in the park. Tubbs Hill is a managed forest and the park is maintained by the Tubbs Hill Foundation and the Friends of Tubbs Hill.

Dogs are permitted at the park with a leash, but bicycles, motor vehicles, alcohol, glass containers, smoking, campfires, and fireworks are not allowed.

== Geography, flora, and fauna ==
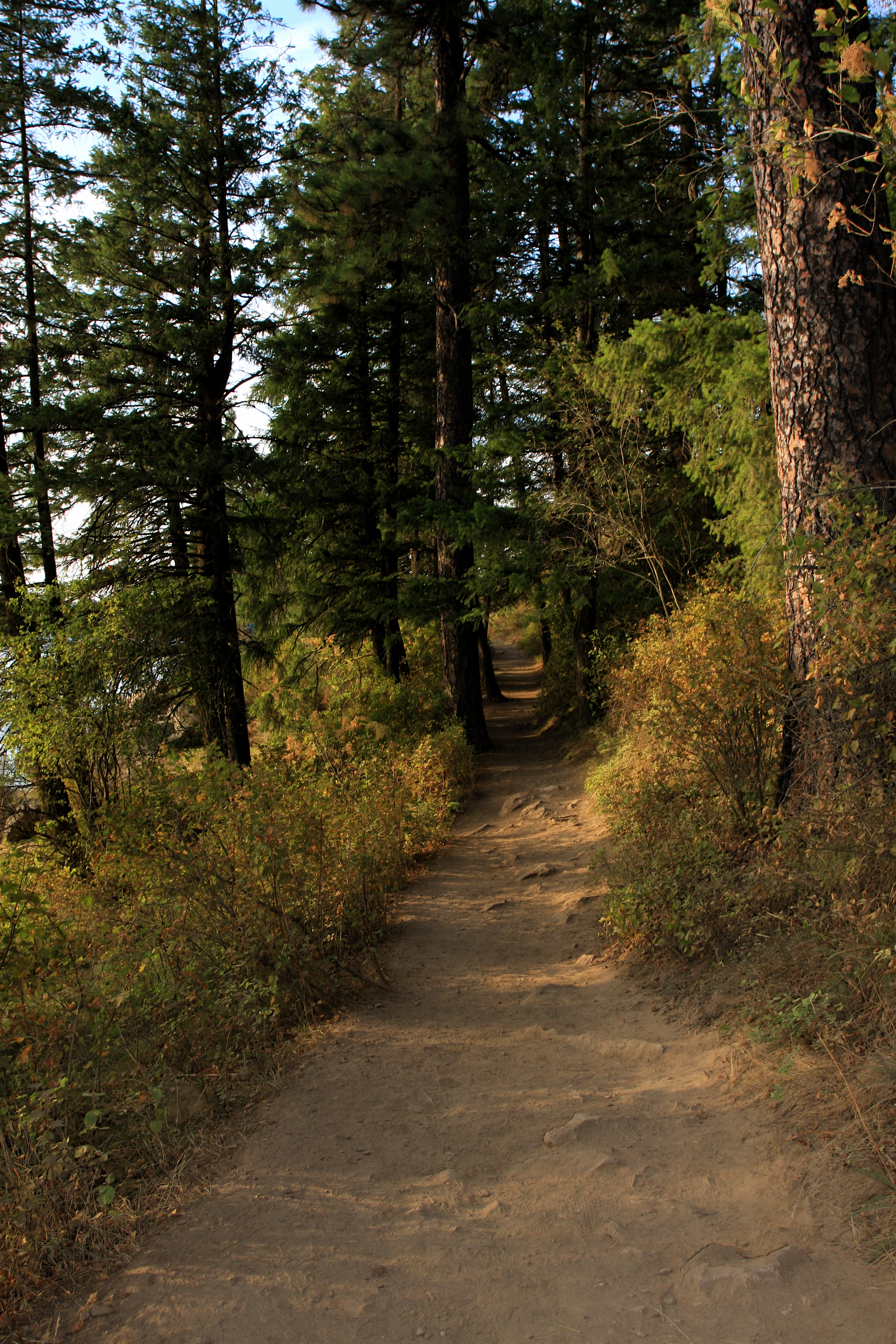
Tubbs Hill trail surrounded by dense foliage

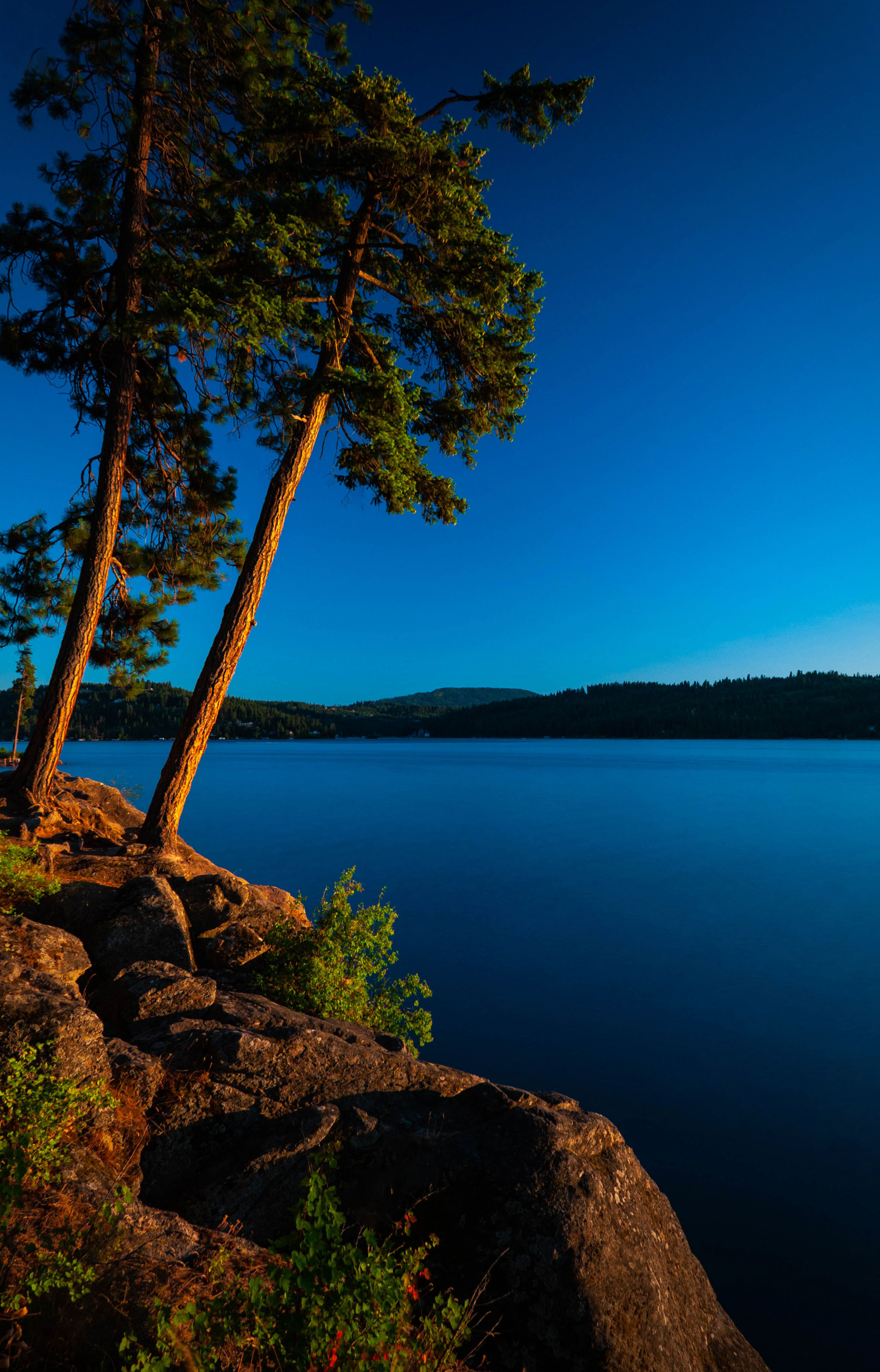
Looking out from the peninsula with lithophytes in view

The 165-acre (0.67 km^{2}) public park and natural area is located on a peninsula within the City of Coeur d'Alene, Idaho with Lake Coeur d'Alene bordering the park on its west, south, and east sides. The park has entrances located at 210 South 3rd Street where it meets McEuen Park and at the southern end of 10th Street. The hill reaches a height of 2,128 feet (649 m) above sea level at water level and 2,503 feet (763 m) at its peak.

Like much of the surrounding region, the lake and rock formations are a legacy of the Missoula floods. When the southward moving Purcell Lobe glacier shrunk and broke up after damming up the Clark Fork River 15,000 years ago, the resulting floodwaters from the backed up Glacial Lake Missoula pushed rock and silt across the Coeur d'Alene River and St. Joe River Valleys. The Precambrian metamorphic schist and gneiss generally make up the rock formation, which were created by the heating of sediments by rising basalt magma and the soil content consists mostly of volcanic ash which was deposited about 6,500 years ago by Mount Mazama as well as contributions from weathering rocks, soil blown in by the wind, and decaying plants and animals. The soil depth rarely exceeds 5 inches (130 mm) deep. Flakes of mica or "fool's gold" can be found in area lakes and streams.

Ponderosa pine and Douglas fir trees are the most common trees observed on Tubbs Hill. Other trees such as the grand fir, western larch, and western white pine are present in lesser numbers. Ponderosa pine and Douglas fir are both conifers but have different growing conditions and the areas in the park where they are found often show notably different understories and habitat types. Ponderosa pine predominates on the south and western facing slopes of the hill where there is more sun and wind whereas Douglas fir is more common on the north and east facing slopes where it is more wet; the wetter habitats are dense with foliage while the drier areas are more open, grassy, and lacking in shrubs. Shrubs that can be found on the trail include kinnikinnick, ocean spray, thimbleberry, paxistima myrsinites, ninebark, Oregon grape, serviceberry, snowberry, and a variety of fern species. Different species of lichen and mosses can also be observed in the park.

Tubbs Hill is a managed forest that is too small to maintain a healthy, natural ecosystem and the park must be regularly maintained. The park is maintained by the Tubbs Hill Foundation and the Friends of Tubbs Hill. Due to the challenges of the geography, most notably the scarcity of nutrient rich topsoil on the solid rock formation, the ecosystem is fragile and plants face many difficulties to survive. The topsoil can be easily displaced and washed downhill into the lake by rainfall events and is therefore highly susceptible to erosion. Plant root systems help keep the topsoil in place, which is why it is advised that parkgoers try to stay on the marked trails, avoid disturbing or stepping on the plant life, and to "take only photographs, leave only footprints." Other essential tasks include the removal of excesses of dead trees to prevent Douglas Fir bark beetle infestations and root rot, and keeping a healthy balance of tree diversity with tree plantings, things that would be done naturally by wildfires.

White-tailed deer, turkey, osprey, and bald eagles frequent or are resident in the park. The birds of prey often will nest in standing dead trees near the shoreline to hunt for fish.

== Features ==
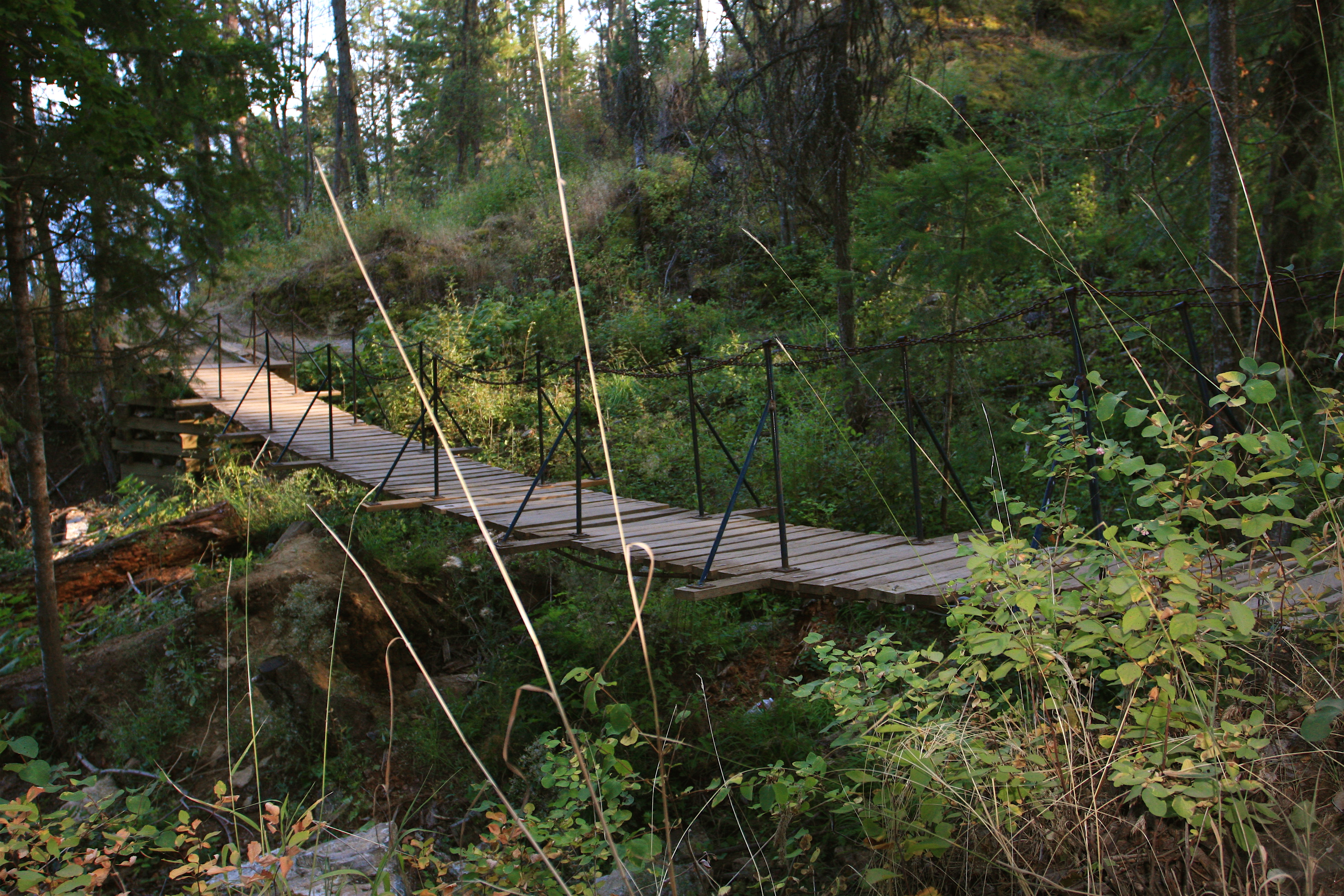
Swinging bridge

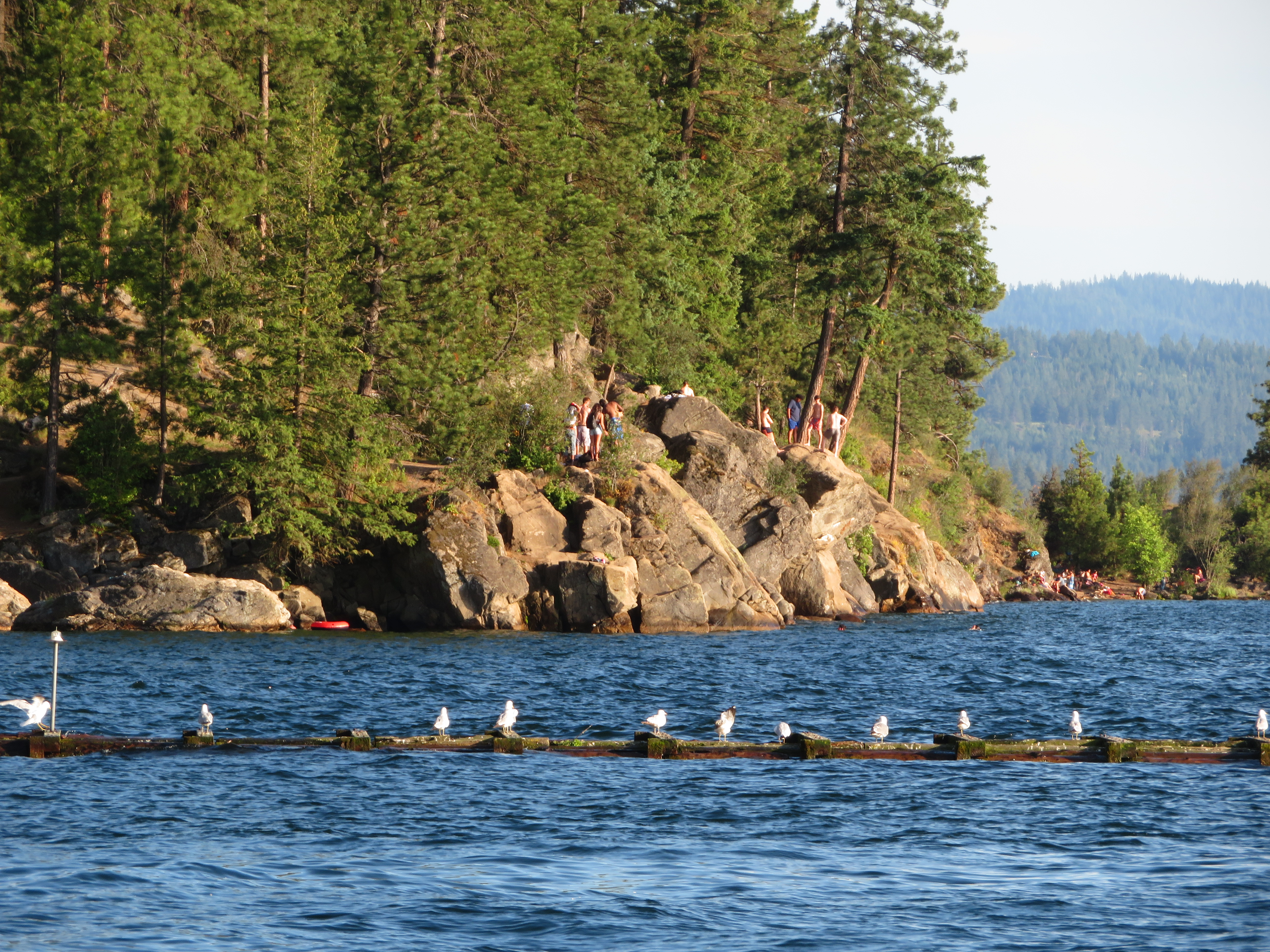
Parkgoers cliff jumping from rock outcroppings

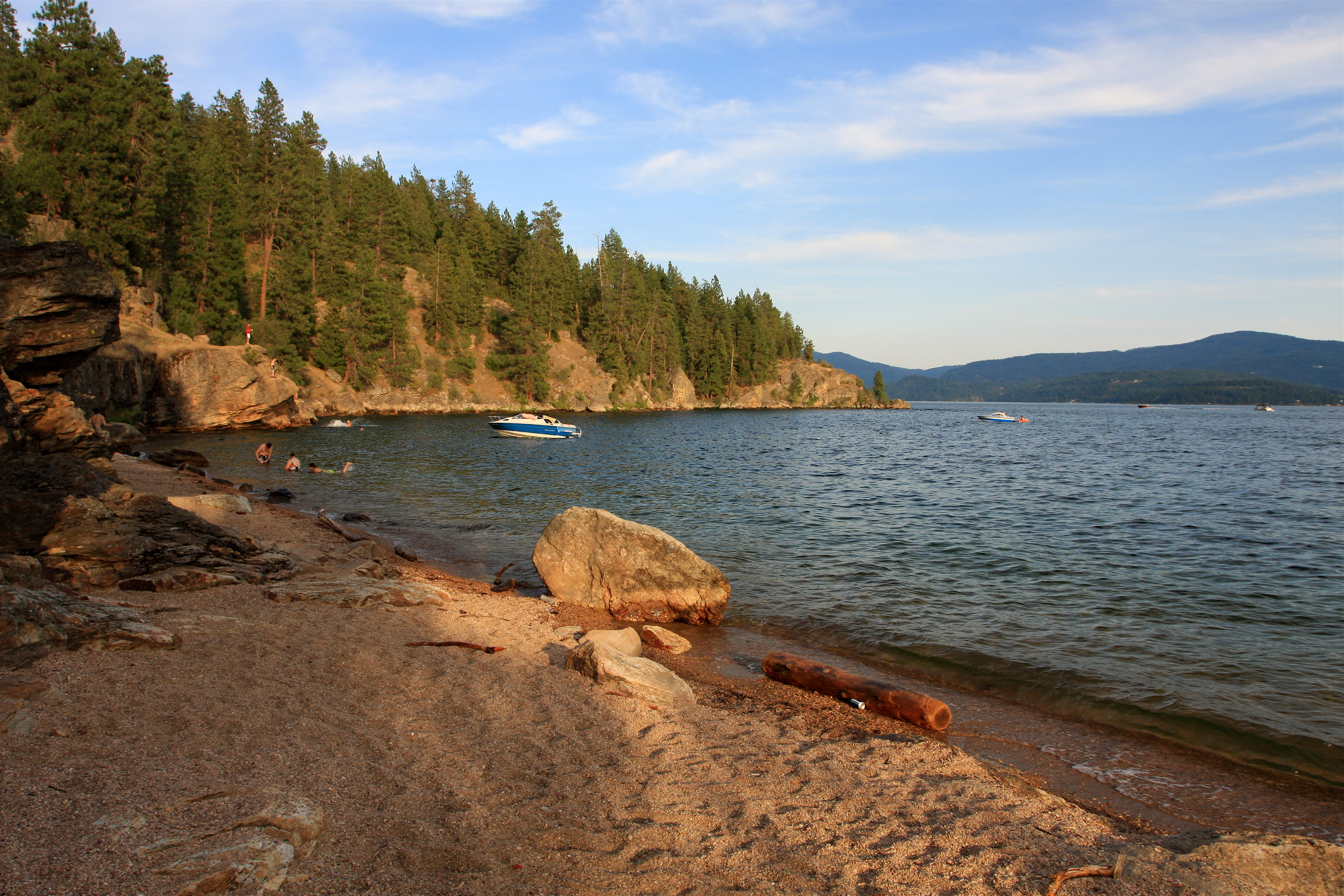
Tubbs Hill Beach

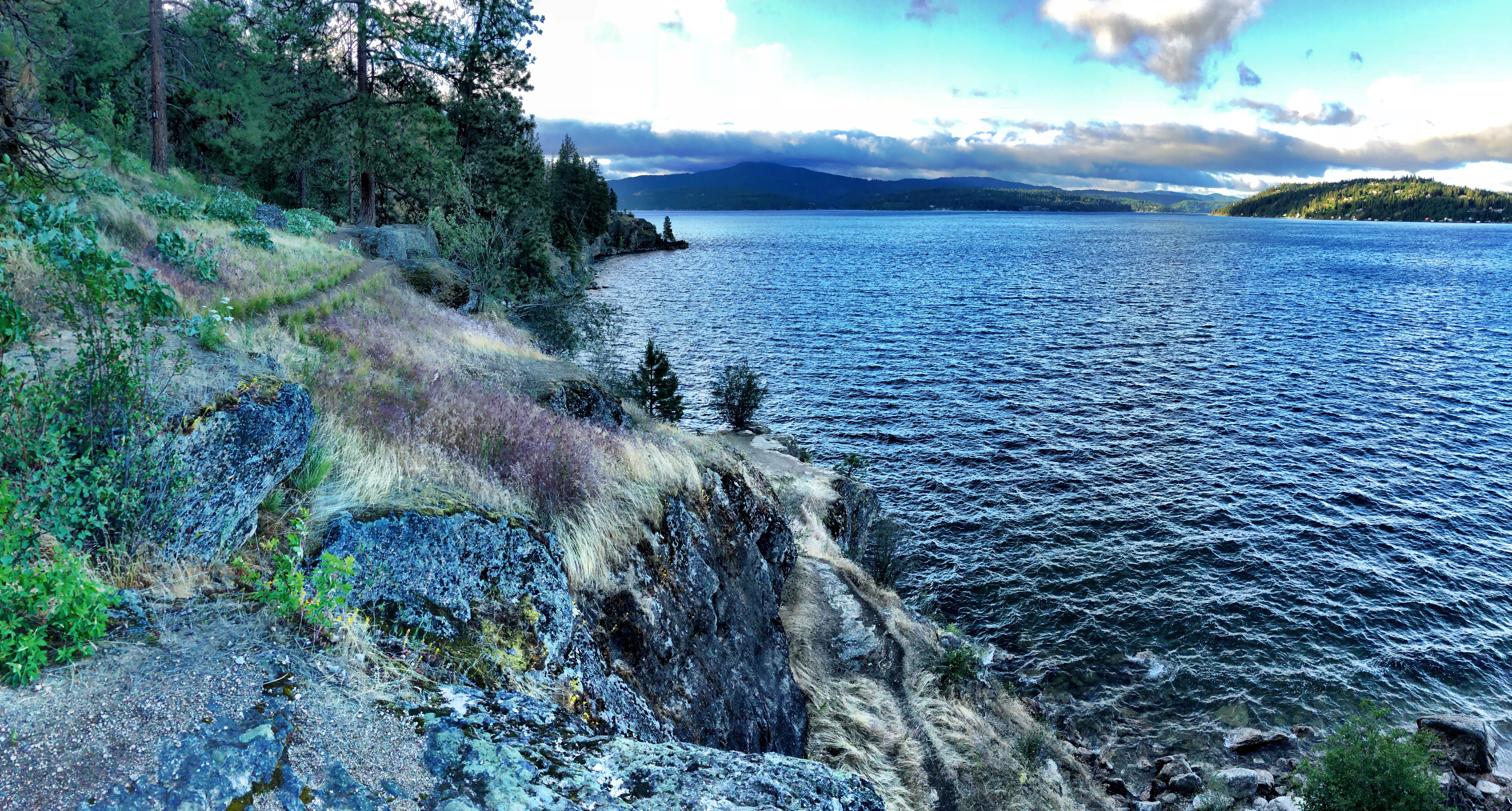
Sweeping view of Lake Coeur d'Alene and Kid Island Bay

The park features beaches that provide access to the lake, a 2.2-mile (3.5 km) interpretive trail and several areas with sweeping views of Lake Coeur d'Alene. Activities such as climbing, cliff jumping, kayaking, fishing, sun bathing, bird watching and flower viewing are also popular activities to do in and around the park.

The primary attraction of the park is the interpretive trail loop, that can get somewhat crowded during the peak seasons, which is from May through October. The compacted dirt trail is narrow but has been rated as "easy" in difficulty, being mostly flat for the first 1-mile (1.6 km) with the main obstacles being rocks and tree roots; the trail is not considered wheelchair or stroller accessible. The elevation gain for the hike is 291 feet (89 m) and on average the trail takes about 52 minutes to complete. The self-guided interpretive trail takes visitors passed scenic viewpoints and historical sites and is demarcated by wood trail markers that are 8 inches (200 mm) by 10 inches (250 mm) in size and posted 8 feet (2.4 m) above ground; at the trail entrance is a map and informational brochure that corresponds to these markers. In addition to the main trail loop are side trails that branch off the main trail, allowing visitors to bisect the loop or go up to the summit of Tubbs Hill.

There are several bridges in the park, most notably a rope suspension bridge. Local wildlife conservation advocates Art Manley and Scott Reed are honored with memorial stones and plaques at the main public entrance of the trail.

== History ==
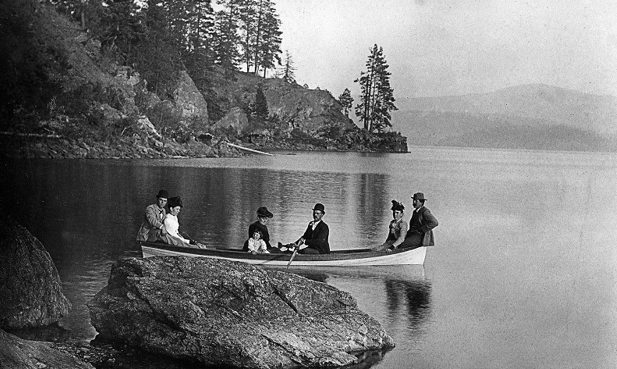
Boaters near Tubbs Hill, 1892

The area that now comprises Tubbs Hill was once in the 4,000,000-acre (16,000 km^{2}) territory of the Coeur d'Alene Tribe of indians. After the incorporation of the City of Coeur d'Alene, land salesmen and German immigrant Tony A. Tubbs platted what was called the “Tubbs Hill Addition to the City of Coeur d'Alene” in 1884 on an over 130-acre (0.53 km^{2}) rectangular plot of land where he proposed several blocks. Tubbs became a prominent and well liked figure in the community, building the first hotel in the city, the Hotel d'Landing and becoming the first Justice of the Peace in the city. Tubbs' development had linear streets, seemingly giving no consideration for the steep hillside grade. A popular sales tactic for undeveloped land employed during this time period involved pitching the plots as if it was flat, shovel-ready land that is prime for construction to unfamiliar settlers who may be buying the property sight unseen. The land that made up Tubbs Hill however was far from an ideal plot on which to build upon; the development sits on an almost solid rock with a height from the hills base to its peak being over 375 feet (114 m) and on a grade that varies between 8 degrees and 30 degrees.

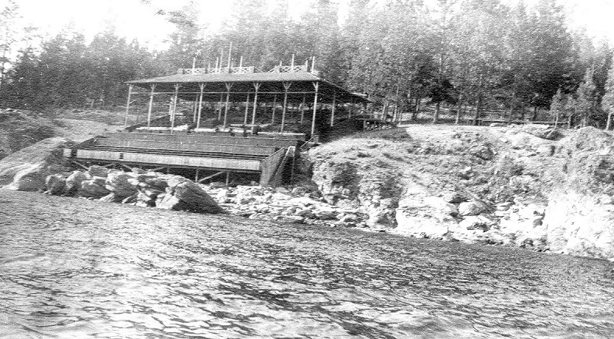
The grandstand on Tubbs Hill, 1920

Tubbs had limited success selling the land. The Washington Water Power Co. (WWP) purchased sections of the south and east faces of the hill to construct a concrete reservoir to store lake water for the city's water supply in 1903 and an additional one in 1949 and the Coeur d'Alene Lumber Company purchased waterfront land directly below the north face of the hill for a sawmill that ceased operations during the Great Depression. A grandstand was built in the 1920s for the viewing of sailboat races and later hydroplane races and other activities in the summer. The Farragut Naval Training Station built housing and a civic center during World War II, both of which were either destroyed or dismantled by the end of the war, leaving an empty field. Some buildings were planned but never constructed, including two large diesel power plants to be built on land acquired by the city in 1936 on the site of the defunct sawmill that was highly scrutinized by WWP and fell through due to the lack of federal funding and litigation. In 1962, the mayor promoted the rezoning of the land for the construction of a convention center atop the hill, but the mayor was voted out the following year and in 1973 some German investors negotiated a contract to build condominiums at the summit, but the property was able to be acquired by the city in 1974. Development of the property was significantly hindered by the poor design of the plats.

Tubbs Hill was obtained by the City of Coeur d'Alene in four separate transactions in the span of 40 years, the first being the 33-acre (0.13 km^{2}) of land that now comprises McEuen Park, City Hall and a sliver of waterfront property that was bought in 1936 for $19,000. An additional three purchases of 34-acre (0.14 km^{2}) sections were made in 1969, 1974, and 1977.

=== Interpretive trail ===
There are some sites of historical significance that can still be seen on the interpretive trail. Just passed the halfway point at 1-mile (1.6 km) the remnants of concrete footings that made up a grandstand that was built in 1914 can be seen. This structure was used to seat spectators for rowing regattas and powerboat races as well as Independence Day celebrations (such as the burning of the lakes old steamboats). At the 2-mile (3.2 km) mark are the concrete footings of the Coeur d'Alene Mill Company, a sawmill that had occupied the site and closed in 1929.
