= Economy of Washington (state) =

The northwestern U.S. state of Washington's economy grew 3.7% in 2016, nearly two and a half times the national rate. Average income per head in 2009 was $41,751, 12th among states of the U.S.

The United States' largest concentration of STEM (science, technology, engineering and math) workers reside in Washington state. The state has a large volume of seaborne foreign trade with Asia. Leading economic sectors are government, real estate and rental leasing, and information; manufacturing comes fourth (8.6% of the state's GDP). Fruit and vegetable production, and hydroelectric power, are other important sectors. Important firms based in Washington include Starbucks, Amazon, Costco, and Microsoft.

Washington does not levy a personal income tax, but raises revenue through sales tax, property tax, and a gross receipts tax on businesses.

== Taxes ==
Until the passage of a millionaires tax in 2026, the state of Washington was one of only seven states that does not levy a personal income tax. The state also does not collect a corporate income tax or franchise tax. However, Washington businesses are responsible for various other state levies. One tax Washington charges on most businesses is the business and occupation tax (B & O), a gross receipts tax which charges varying rates for different types of businesses.

Washington's state base sales tax is 6.5 percent which is combined with a local sales tax which varies by locality. The combined state and local retail sales tax rates increase the taxes paid by consumers, depending on the variable local sales tax rates, generally between 7.5 and 10 percent. As of 2026 October, the combined sales tax rate in Seattle was 10.55 percent. The cities of Lynnwood and Edmonds have the highest sale tax rate in the state at 10.7 percent. These taxes apply to services as well as products. Most foods are exempt from sales tax; however, prepared foods, dietary supplements and soft drinks remain taxable.

An "ex" applies to certain select products such as gasoline, cigarettes, and alcoholic beverages. Property tax was the first tax levied in the state of Washington and its collection accounts for about 30% of Washington's total state and local revenue. It continues to be the most important revenue source for public schools, fire protection, libraries, parks and recreation, and other special-purpose districts.

All real property and personal property is subject to tax unless specifically exempted by law. Personal property also is taxed, although most personal property owned by individuals is exempt. Personal property tax applies to personal property used when conducting business or to other personal property not exempt by law. All property taxes are paid to the county treasurer's office where the property is located. Washington does not impose a tax on assets such as bank accounts, stocks or bonds. Neither does the state assess any tax on retirement income earned and received from another state. Washington does not collect inheritance taxes; however, the estate tax is decoupled from the federal estate tax laws, and therefore the state imposes its own estate tax.

== Personal income ==
The per capita personal income in 2009 was $41,751, 12th in the nation. A study by the National Partnership for Women and Families reported that Washington state had the second largest income gap between men and women in the United States during 2024. Women earned over $18,000 less per year than men. Comparing female racial demographics to that of employed white men, women of Latin and Native American heritage earned $37,000 and $33,000 less per year, respectively. In 2023, the average gap was reported to be $17,400.

Several notable billionaires including Bill Gates, technology advisor and former Chairman & CEO of Microsoft, live in the state. Other state billionaires include Steve Ballmer (Microsoft), Craig McCaw (McCaw Cellular Communications), James Jannard (Oakley), Howard Schultz (Starbucks), and Charles Simonyi (Microsoft).

== Trade ==
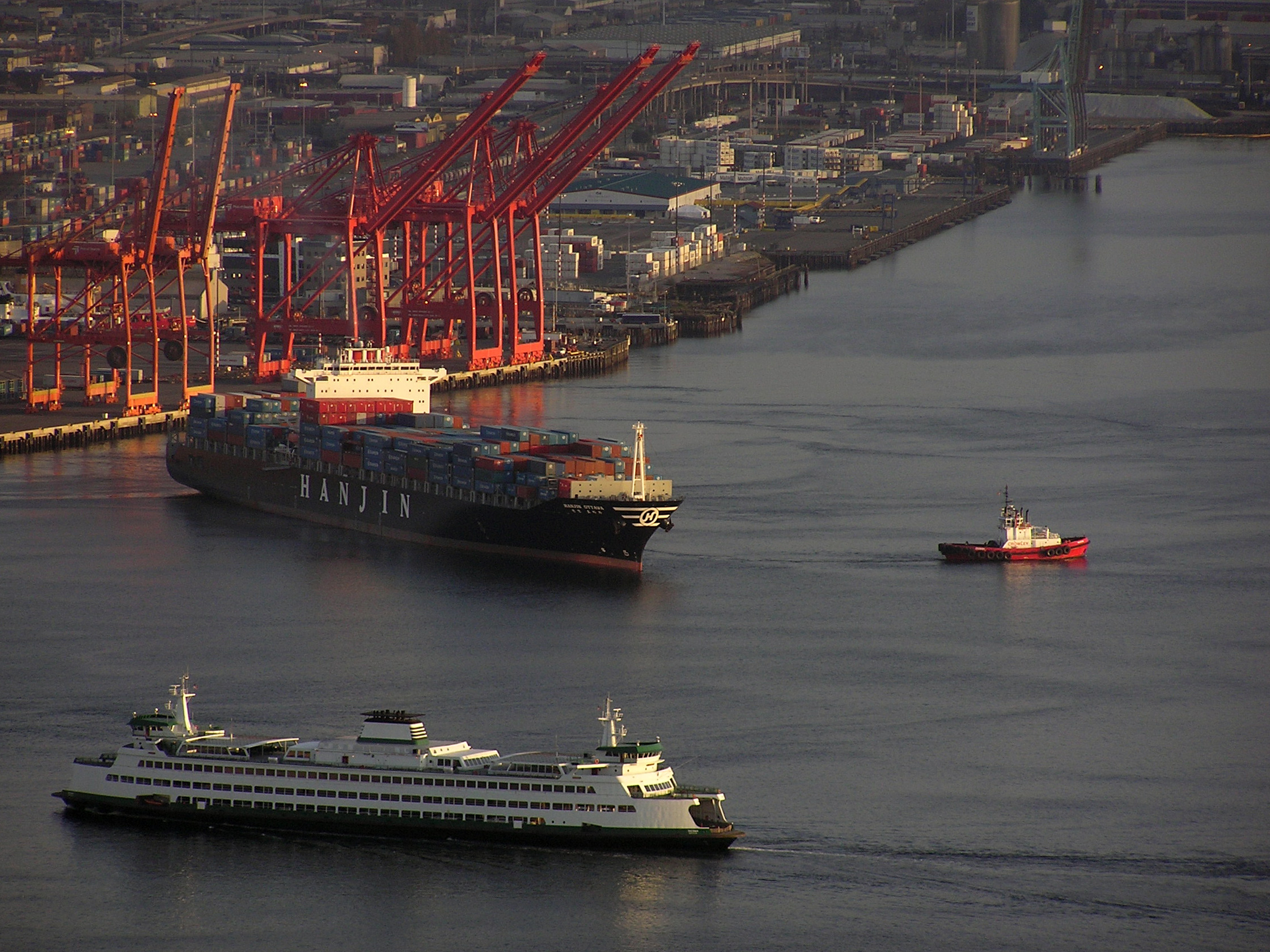
A container ship and the Bainbridge Island ferry near Terminal 46

Significant amounts of trade with Asia pass through the ports of the Puget Sound. Washington is the fourth largest exporting state in the United States, after New York, California, and Texas.

The ports of Washington handle 8% of all American exports and receive 6% of the nation's imports.

== Industries ==
=== Manufacturing and commercial ===
Key businesses within the state include the design and manufacture of jet aircraft (Boeing), computer software development (Microsoft, Nintendo of America, Valve), online retailers (Amazon, Expedia, Inc.), electronics, biotechnology, aluminum production, lumber and wood products (Weyerhaeuser), mining, and tourism.

A Fortune magazine survey of the top 20 most admired companies in the US included four Washington-based companies: Starbucks, Microsoft, Costco and Nordstrom.

Washington was one of eighteen states which had a government monopoly on sales of alcoholic beverages, although beer and wine with less than 20% alcohol by volume could be purchased in convenience stores and supermarkets. Liqueurs (even if under 20% alcohol by volume) and spirits could only be purchased in state-run or privately owned-state-contracted liquor stores. This however was overturned by 2011's Initiative 1183 which ceased state-run liquor stores as of June 1, 2012.

=== Agriculture ===
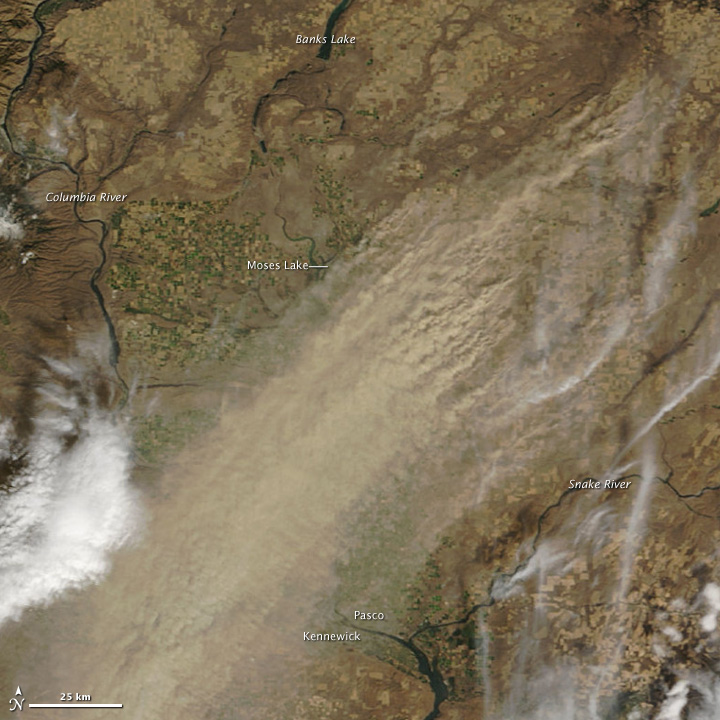
Dryland farming caused a large dust storm in parts of Eastern Washington on October 4, 2009.

Washington is a leading agricultural state. (The following figures are from the Washington State Office of Financial Management and the USDA, National Agricultural Statistics Service, Washington Field Office). For 2003, the total value of Washington's agricultural products was $5.79 billion, the 11th highest in the country. The total value of its crops was $3.8 billion, the 7th highest. The total value of its livestock and specialty products was $1.5 billion, the 26th highest. In 2010, the total value of the crops was $7.93 billion.

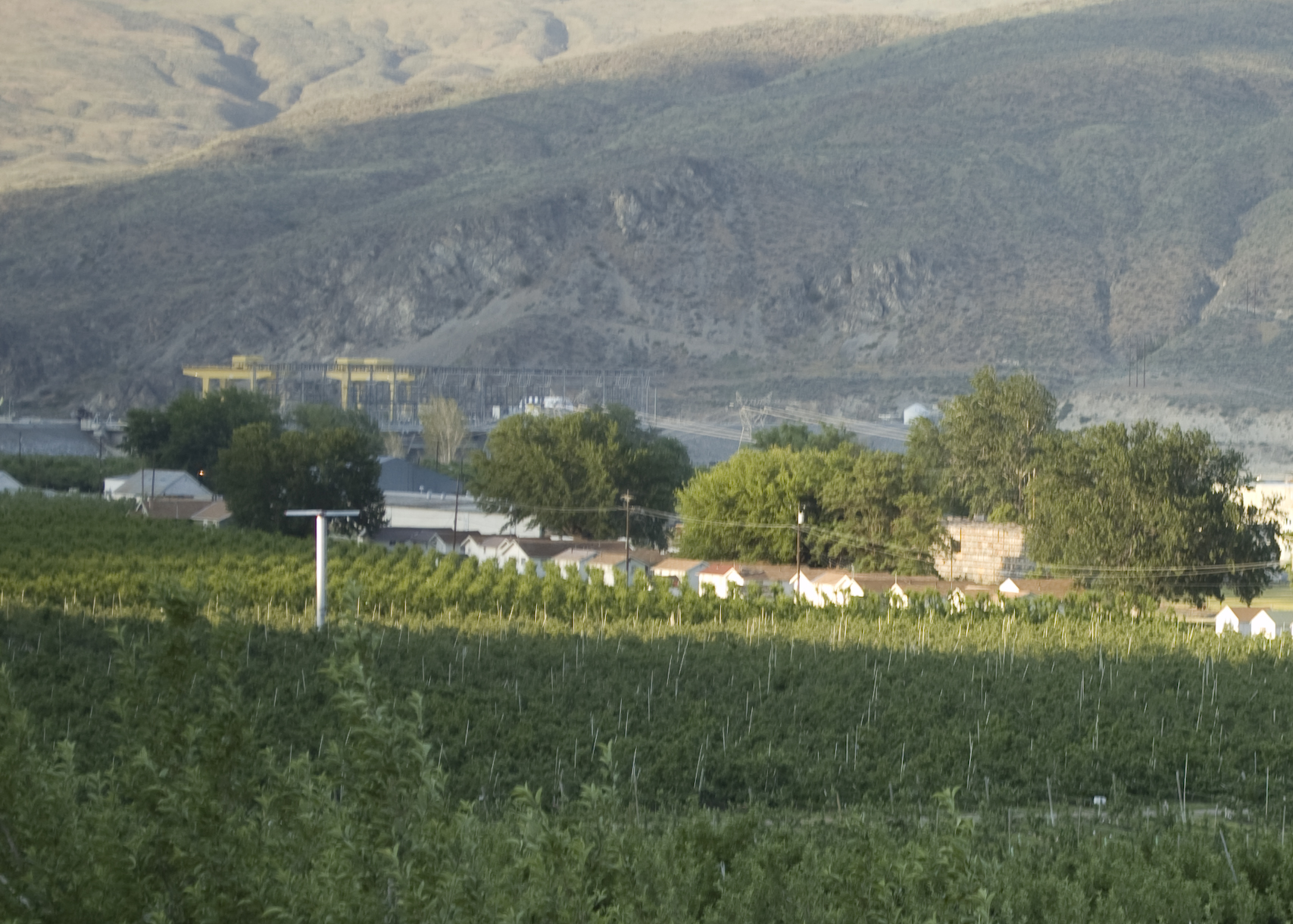
Azwell, Washington, a small community of pickers' cabins and apple orchards. Wells Dam visible in background.

In 2004, Washington ranked first in the nation in production of red raspberries (90.0% of total U.S. production), wrinkled seed peas (80.6%), hops (75.0%), spearmint oil (73.6%), apples (58.1%), sweet cherries (47.3%), pears (42.6%), peppermint oil (40.3%), Concord grapes (39.3%), carrots for processing (36.8%), and Niagara grapes (31.6%). Washington also ranked second in the nation in production of lentils, fall potatoes, dry edible peas, apricots, grapes (all varieties taken together), asparagus (over a third of the nation's production), sweet corn for processing, and green peas for processing; third in tart cherries, prunes and plums, and dry summer onions; fourth in barley and trout; and fifth in wheat, cranberries, and strawberries.

==== Apples ====
The apple industry is of particular importance to Washington. Because of the favorable climate of dry, warm summers and cold winters of Central Washington, the state has led the U.S. in apple production since the 1920s. Two areas in Eastern Washington – the Yakima River valley and the Wenatchee River valley – account for the vast majority of the state's apple crop. The Washington Apple Commission regulates the industry.

=== Energy ===
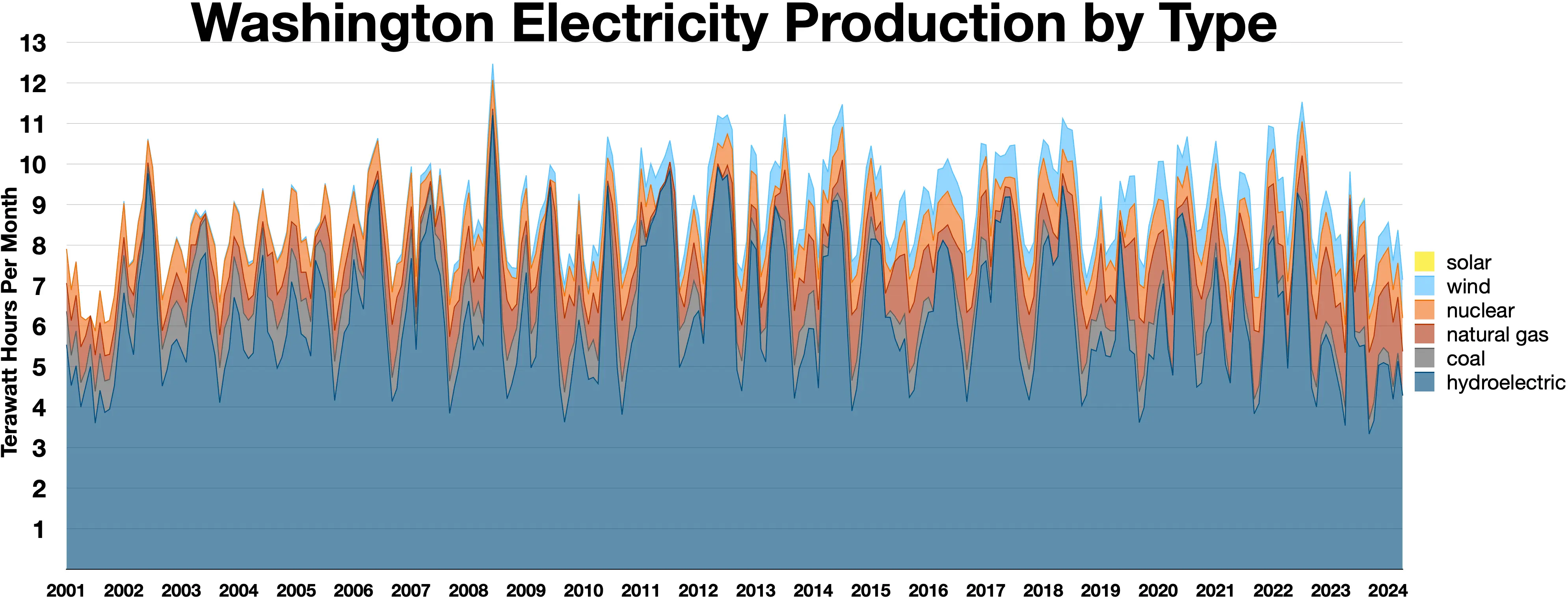
Washington electricity production by type

Washington is the leading producer of hydroelectric power in the U.S. Hydroelectricity makes up over half of electricity state's electric generation and nearly 35% of its total energy consumption.

== Employment ==
Employment by industry in Washington

Industry	Employment thousands March 2013	Percent of total employment
Trade, transportation and utilities	548.2	18.84%
Government	540.9	18.59%
Education and health services	392.2	13.4%
Professional and business services	352.0	12.10%
Manufacturing	288.0	9.90%
Leisure and hospitality	281.7	9.65%
Financial activities	142.3	4.89%
Other services	112.4	3.86%
Information	104.7	3.60%
Mining, logging and construction	6.1	0.21%
Total	2,909.5	100%

== Real estate ==
At $43 billion, real estate and rental leasing forms 12.14% of total GDP in Washington. (see above)

On December 4, 2016 Bloomberg compared the cost of housing between Vancouver, British Columbia and Seattle. There has been a 50 percent increase in home prices in Seattle in the past five years, but the median home value is still less than in San Francisco and Los Angeles. As in Vancouver some of the increase in home prices is attributed to Chinese investors. On December 9, 2016, The Seattle Times mentioned proposed legislation to allow more and larger mother-in-law apartments and backyard cottages in neighborhoods zoned for single-family houses in Seattle.

== See also ==
- Economy of Spokane, Washington
- List of US state economies
- Washington (state)
