= Gold Reserve Inc. =

American gold mining company

- Traded as: TSX-V: GRZ
- Industry: Gold, Copper Ores
- Headquarters: Spokane, Washington, United States
- Key people: Rockne J. Timm
- Website: goldreserveinc.com

Gold Reserve Inc. is a gold mining company founded in 1956 with operations and mining property in Bolivar State, Venezuela.

The company is currently headquartered in Spokane, Washington.

As a part of a 2016 settlement based on a dispute over withdrawal of a gold concession to Gold Reserve, the government of Venezuela entered into a joint venture with the company to mine the Brisas and Las Cristinas goldmines.
