= Key Tronic =

Technology company founded in 1969

Key Tronic Corporation
- Classic Key Tronic monogram and wordmark
- Trade name: Keytronic
- Type: Public
- Traded as: Nasdaq: KTCC; Russell Microcap Index component
- Industry: Computer peripherals
- Founded: 1969; 57 years ago
- Headquarters: Spokane Valley, Washington, U.S.
- Key people: Brett Larsen (CEO)
- Products: Keyboards
- Revenue: ▲US$588 million (2023)
- Number of employees: 3,539 (2025)
- Website: keytronic.com

Key Tronic Corporation (branded Keytronic) is a technology company founded in 1969 by Lewis G. Zirkle. Its core products initially included keyboards, mice and other input devices. Key Tronic currently specializes in printed circuit board (PCB) and full product assembly. The company is among the ten largest contract manufacturers providing electronic manufacturing services in the US. The company offers full product design or assembly of a wide variety of household goods and electronic products such as keyboards, printed circuit board assembly, plastic molding, thermometers, toilet bowl cleaners, satellite tracking systems, etc.

== Keyboards ==
After the introduction of the IBM PC, Keytronic began manufacturing keyboards compatible with those computer system units.

Their early keyboards used an Intel 8048 microcontroller (MCU). However, as the company evolved, they began to use their own 8048-based and 83C51KB-based MCUs.

In 1978, Keytronic Corporation began producing keyboards with capacitive-based switches. These keyboards had sponge pad with a conductive-coated Mylar plastic sheet on the switch plunger, and two half-moon trace patterns on the printed circuit board below. As the key was depressed, the capacitance between the plunger pad and the patterns on the PCB below changed, which was detected by integrated circuits (IC).

=== Natural Keyboard ===
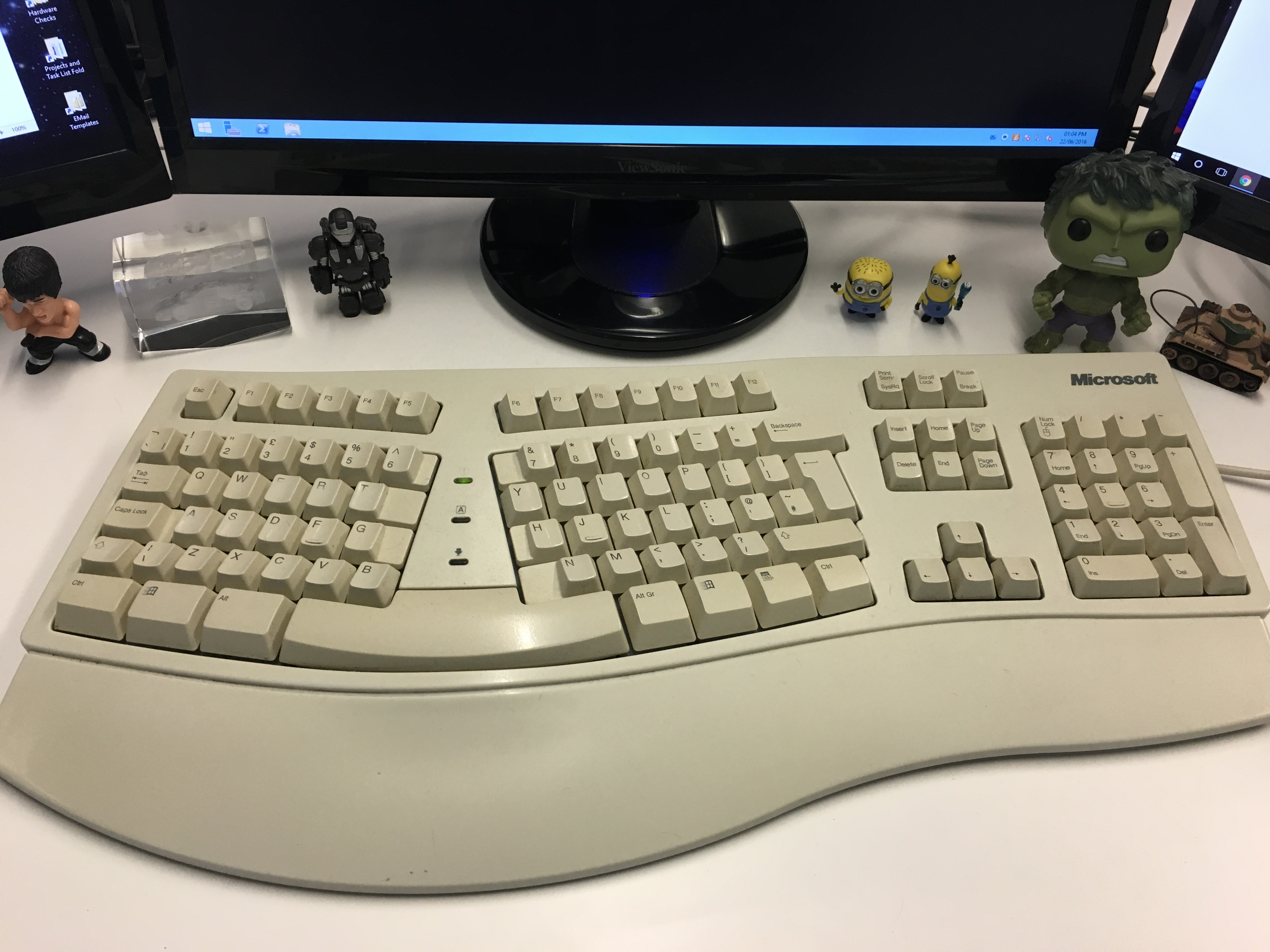
Microsoft Natural Keyboard Gen1/V1

The first generation of Microsoft ergonomic keyboards was designed by the Microswitch division of Honeywell, which was acquired by Key Tronic in early 1994. Over 3 million units had been sold by February 1998, when its successor, the Natural Keyboard Elite, was introduced. It introduced three new keys purposed for Microsoft's Windows 95: two Windows logo keys (⊞ Win) between the Ctrl and Alt keys on each side, and a ≣ Menu key between the right Windows and Ctrl keys.

In 1997, Key Tronic landed the contract for the second generation.

=== ErgoForce ===
Keytronic's "ErgoForce" technology includes different keys having rubber domes with different stiffness. The alphabetic keys intended to be struck with the little finger need only 35 grams of force to actuate, while other alphabetic keys need 45 grams.

== Corporate information ==
The company, which has been described as a contract manufacturer, was founded in 1969, went public in 1983, and as of 2025 has an estimated 3,500 employees.

As of 2026, Key Tronic has six manufacturing locations in: Springdale, Arkansas; Oakdale, Minnesota; Corinth, Mississippi; Juarez, Mexico; Da Nang, Vietnam; and Shanghai, China.
