= Amelia Wheaton =

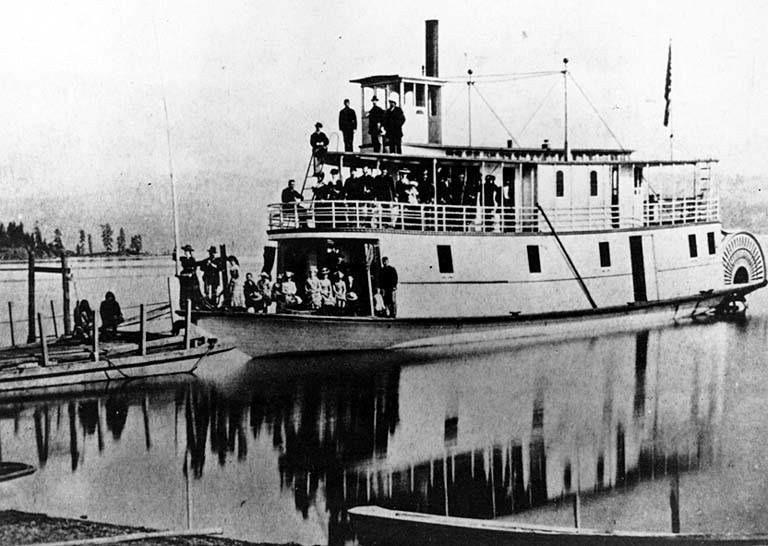
- Sternwheeler Amelia Wheaton.

History
- Name: Amelia Wheaton
- Owner: U.S. Government; St. Joe Transportation Co.; People's Transportation Co.
- Route: Lake Coeur d'Alene and St. Joe River
- Cost: $8,000
- Launched: 1880
- In service: 1880
- Out of service: 1892
- Fate: Dismantled

General characteristics
- Type: inland steamship
- Tonnage: 276
- Length: 76 ft (23.2 m), exclusive of fantail.
- Beam: 17 ft (5.2 m)
- Depth: 4 ft (1 m) depth of hold
- Decks: three (freight, passenger, boat)
- Installed power: twin horizontally mounted steam engines
- Propulsion: stern-wheel
- Speed: 8 to 10 miles per hour

Amelia Wheaton was a stern-wheel driven steamboat that operated on Lake Coeur d'Alene and the St. Joe river from 1880 to 1892. This was the first steam-powered vessel to operate on the lake and the adjacent river. This boat was sometimes referred to as simply the Wheaton.

== Construction ==
Amelia Wheaton was built for the U.S. Army by C.P. Sorenson. Construction began in 1878, and after many difficulties in obtaining materials and components, was finally completed in late 1880. The steamer was named after a daughter of the post commander.

== Dimensions ==
Dimensions of the Wheaton vary. According to one non-contemporaneous source, Wheaton was 86 feet long (exclusive of fantail), 14 feet beam.

Another source gives a length of 100 feet long and 16 feet beam, which would likely have included the fantail and the guards.

An 1888 source is perhaps most reliable, as it is a listing of the steamer for sale by the government. According to this source, the Wheaton was 76 feet long, with a beam of 17 feet, and depth of hold of 4 feet. In 1888, the lower cabin measured 8x14x57 feet. The upper cabin measured 7.5x14x30 feet.

== Engineering ==
The twin steam engines each had an 8-inch bore and a 24-inch stroke. The engines generated about 40 horsepower in 1888. The steamer's speed was said to be between 8 and 10 miles per hour.

== Operations ==
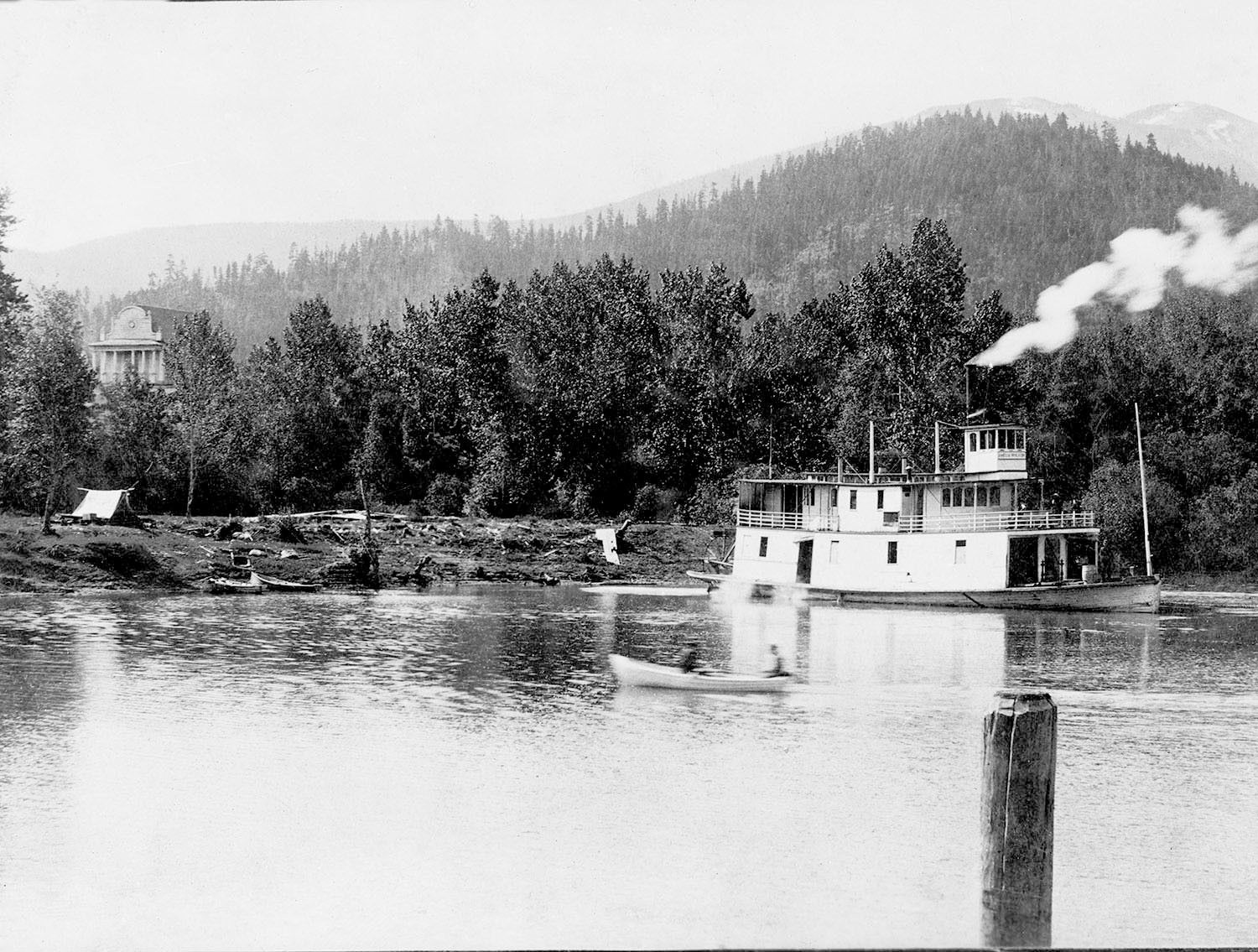
Amelia Wheaton at the Old Mission.

Amelia Wheaton was formally purchased by the government on August 24, 1880 for a price of $8,000. The Wheaton was however little used for the rest of the fiscal year, with operating expenses totally only $165. As of July 1881, Wheaton made only monthly trips to the Old Mission, on the St. Joe River. Wheaton was expected to increase the frequency of the trips to the mission to tri-weekly once hay making season began in 1881.

The first pilot of the Wheaton was Private William J. Applebee, who had had 14 years experience in the navy. Sorenson himself was made the first captain of the steamer. Wheaton was used mostly for transport feed for the cavalry mules at Fort Sherman, hay from the old mission at St. Maries and grain from Farmington. The steamer was also expected to move troops in the case of conflict with the Coeur d'Alene people. Captain Sorensen, operating the Wheaton, named most of the bays and features of Lake Coeur d'Alene.

=== Gold strike at Prichard Creek ===
In August 1883, news was announced in Spokane, Washington of a gold strike in the area of Prichard Creek, a tributary of the Coeur d'Alene River, which in turn flowed into Lake Coeur d'Alene. A gold rush then occurred, which quickly resulted in 10,000 people coming into the Prichard Creek area.

Although the Wheaton was still in government ownership at the time, the government permitted it to be used by the miners to transport themselves and their equipment from Coeur d'Alene City to the head of navigation on the Coeur d'Alene river. In low water, this was the Old Mission, and in high water this was Kingston, Idaho. From the head of navigation, the miners went overland on the Jackass Trail to the gold fields. Transport costs were extreme: about $600 a ton to move freight from Coeur d'Alene city to Eagle City, a boomtown in the Prichard Creek valley.

=== Sale to private interests ===
The Wheaton was sold to private parties in 1888. The sale was advertised as far away as Astoria, Oregon, to take place on May 19, 1888, at 11:00 a.m., at Fort Sherman.

=== Ownership changes ===
The St. Joe Transportation Company was incorporated on January 27, 1891 to run a steamboat business on Lake Coeur d'Alene. There were five directors, all of Coeur d'Alene City: Frank W. Bradley, E.B. Shnik, Arthur Powell, C.A. Waters, and George B. Wannacott. The company was already running boats on the lake prior to its incorporation.

In the summer of 1892, the People's Transportation Company was organized by a number of citizens of Coeur d'Alene city, and the new company absorbed the St. Joe Transportation Company.

=== Later operations ===
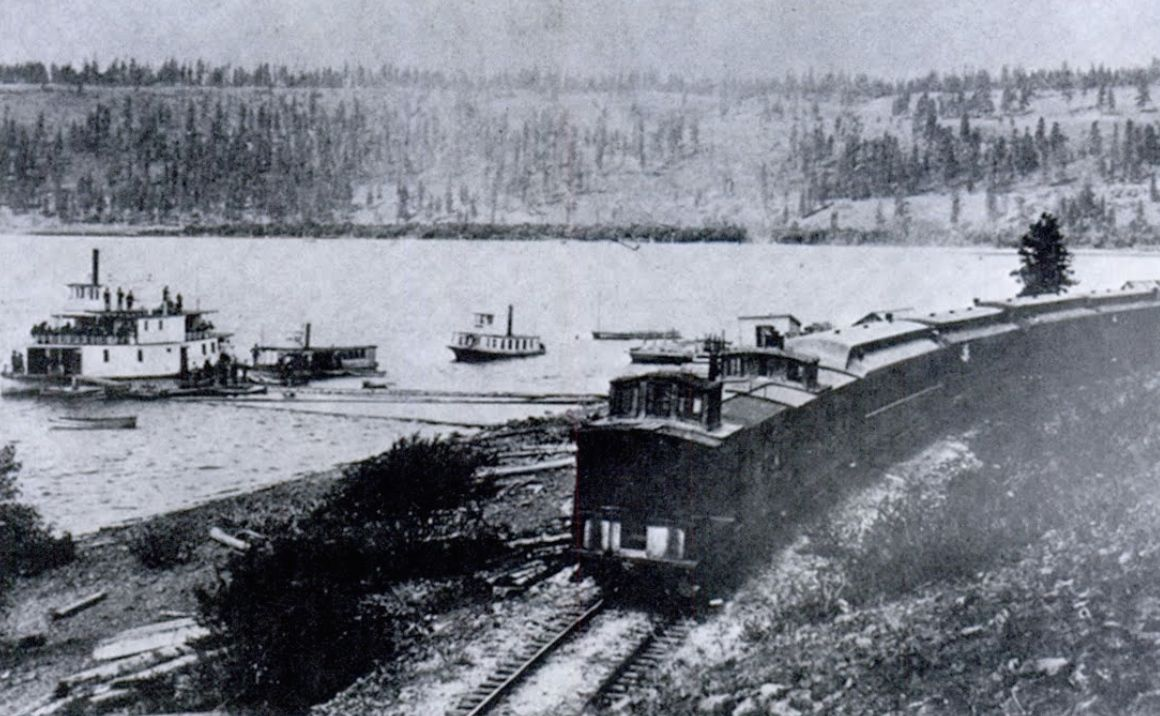
Amelia Wheaton in the area of Harrison, Idaho, circa 1890.

In late March, 1892, Wheaton made its first trip of the season up the St. Joe River, under Captain Ed Shuck, with A.H. Butler as engineer and Frank Bradley serving as purser. The boat was reported to have been "overhauled and fitted up in good shape for the season's work." By the end of the following May, however, the owners of the "fast and commodious steamer … Amelia Wheaton" were reported to be giving the vessel a "thorough overhauling." When the repairs were complete, the steamer was to be placed on its old route between Coeur d'Alene City and the head of navigation on the St. Joe river.

In late June 1892, the People's Transportation Company, of Coeur d'Alene city, was advertising Sunday excursions on Amelia Wheaton from the wharf of the St. Joe Transportation Company, departing the dock at 10:00 a.m. for Beauty Bay, returning at 12:30 p.m. In the afternoon, the Wheaton would depart at 2:00 p.m. for Echo and Mica Bays, returning to Coeur d'Alene city at 5:30 p.m. Fare for each round trip was to be 50 cents.

Wheaton was carrying freight on the lake bound for Harrison, Idaho in November 1892, when a high wind made the lake so rough that a landing could not be made, and the steamer had to proceed on its course to the St. Joe river.

On December 3, 1892, Amelia Wheaton was reported to have ceased its regular trips to Harrison, and to have been replaced by one of the smaller boats of People's Transportation Co.

== Disposition ==
On April 1, 1893, it was reported that the machinery had been removed from the Amelia Wheaton and would probably be placed in a new hull. The engines were removed and installed in a new sternwheeler, the St. Joe. The hull was converted to a barge.

== See also ==
- Steam navigation on Lake Coeur d'Alene
