= Idaho (steamship) =

American steamship

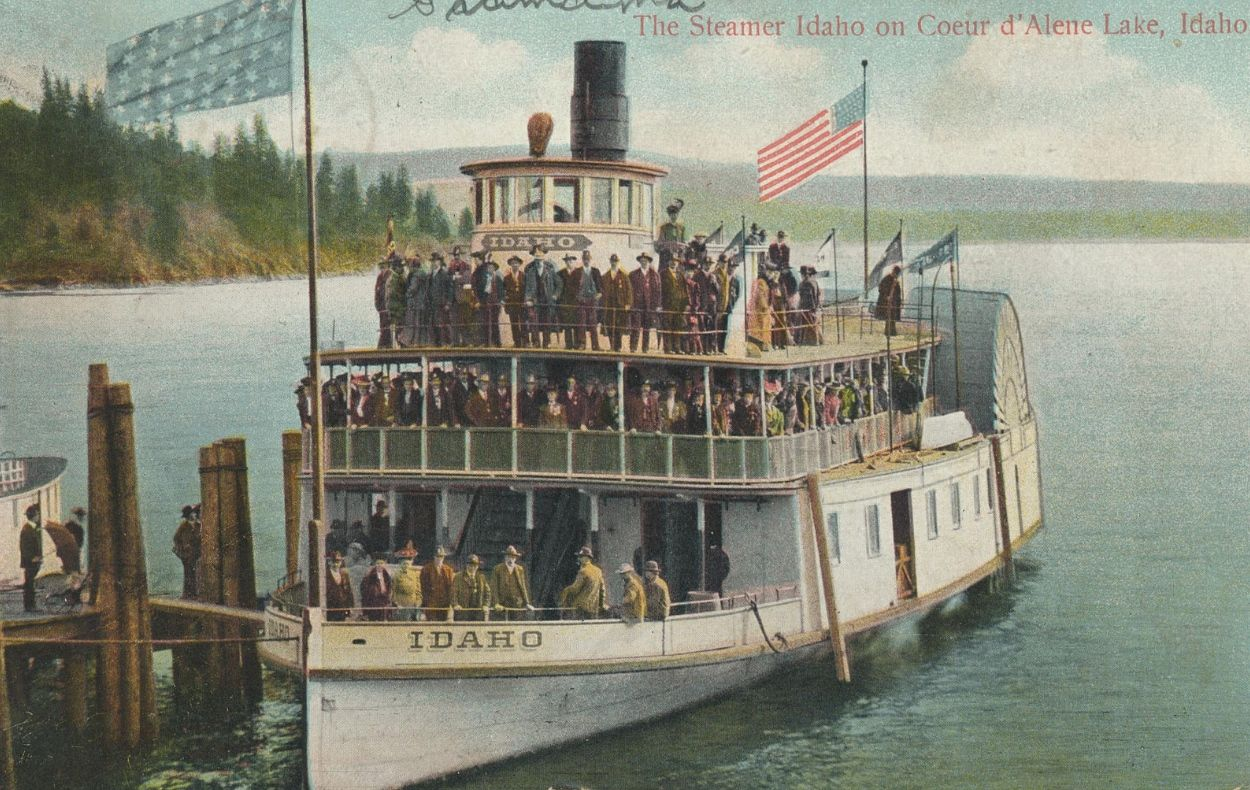
The Idaho at the Spokane and Inland Empire Railroad docks in Coeur d'Alene in 1909.

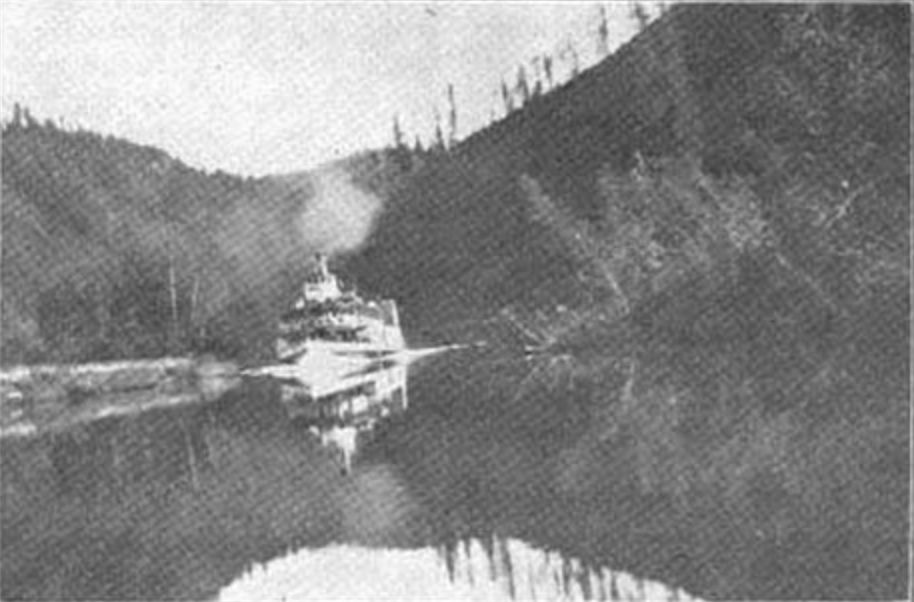
Idaho on the St. Joe River in 1908.

The Idaho was a paddle steamer belonging to the Red Collar Line and active around 1903 to 1915, operating on Lake Coeur d'Alene, between Harrison and Coeur d'Alene, Idaho.

The Idaho was 147 feet long and the beam was 40 feet measured over the main deck. The Idaho had a capacity of 1,000 passengers. The Idaho was built in 1903 for $45,000 by George Ryan in Oshkosh, Wisconsin for the Coeur d'Alene and St. Joe Transportation Co. Ltd. The Idaho was launched on June 20, 1903. The engines were described to be of a "clack valve" type and it was capable of 15 miles per hour. The Idaho was operated under the Red Collar Line in March 1908. The Idaho caught fire and sank in Blackrock Bay in 1915 during apple season.
