= Steamboats on Lake Coeur d'Alene =

Steamboats on lake in Idaho, USA

Lake Coeur d'Alene steam navigation
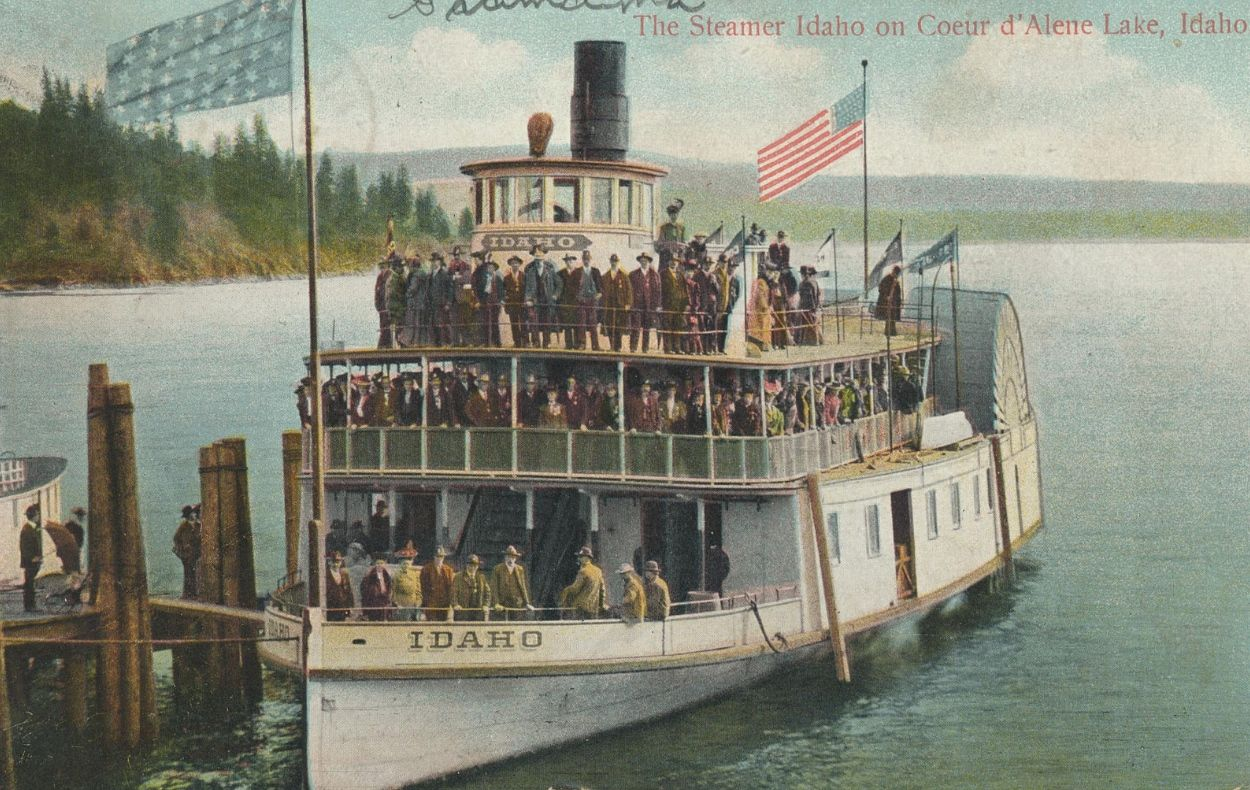
- Locale: Kootenai County, Idaho
- Waterway: Lake Coeur d'Alene
- Transit type: Steamboat
- Owner: Red Color Line (1908–1922), and others
- Began operation: 1880
- Ended operation: 1936

Steam navigation on Lake Coeur d'Alene lasted from the 1880s to the 1930s. More steamboats operated on Lake Coeur d’Alene than on any other lake west of the Great Lakes. The high point of steam navigation was probably from 1908 to 1913. After that railroads, and increasingly automobile and truck traffic on newly built highways supplanted steam navigation, although some vessels continued to be operated until the mid-1930s.

== Operations ==
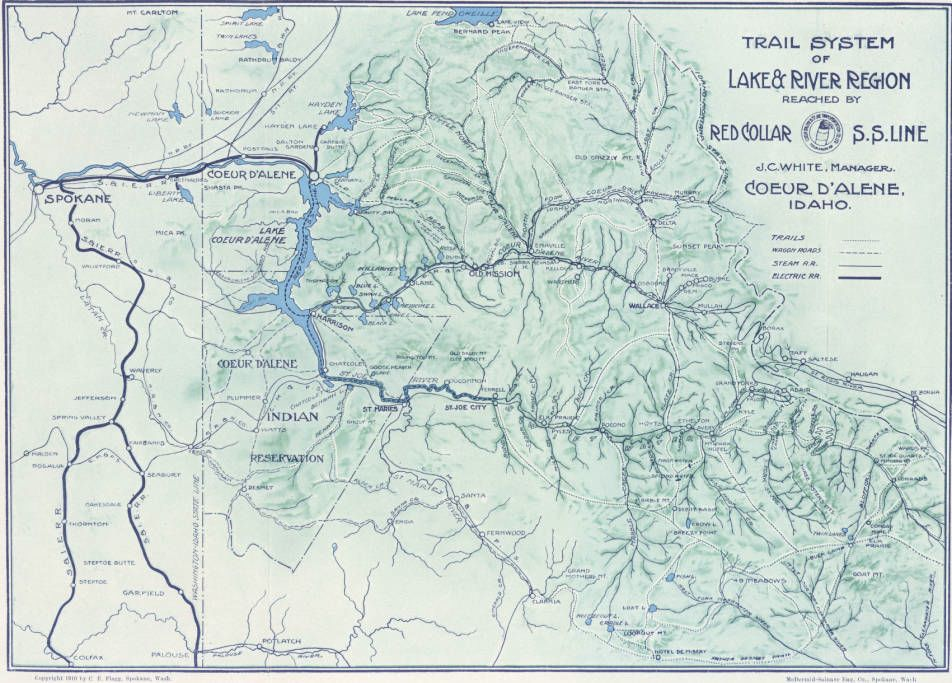
The Red Collar Line service map

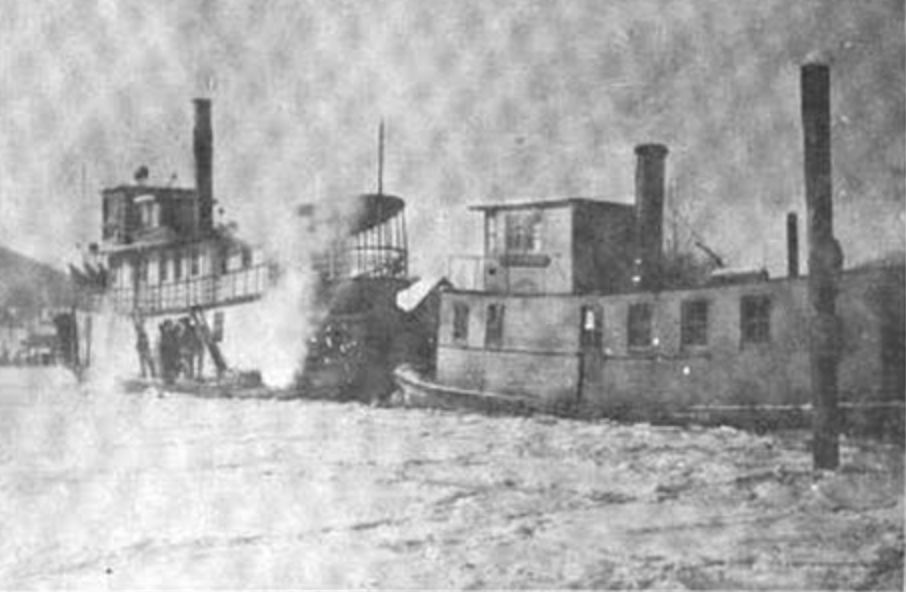
An ice-breaking operation on the St. Joe River ca. 1908

In September 1908, the Red Collar steamship line operated seven steamers on Lake Coeur d'Alene, which was 27 miles, running mainly in a north–south direction. The main city on the lake was Coeur d’Alene, at the northern, downstream end. By 1908 the city of Coeur d'Alene was connected by steam and electric rail lines to Spokane, Washington, about 30 miles to the west. The lake varied from 50 to 400 feet deep, and with the adjacent navigable St. Joe River, formed a natural water route just over 60 miles long.

In the summer months, in 1908, the Red Collar Line ran three trips daily on the lake to St. Maries, a 45-mile run, and two trips daily to St. Joe. In 1908, the steamer North Star, made the St. Maries run in 3 hours 40 minutes.

The fast steamers Flyer and Idaho were operated on the 20 mile run between Coeur d’Alene and Harrison. Winter service on the lake often required ice-breaking, which sometimes took as many as three steamers to force a passage through the ice.

Sources of coal in the area included Rosyln and Rock Springs.

=== Lack of regulation ===
There were no federal steamboat inspectors assigned to Lake Coeur d’Alene, and there were frequent races, overcrowding of vessels, instances of drunken crew members, including captains and pursers, and other hazardous actions. Another dangerous practice was to haul dynamite at the same time as a vessel carried passengers. However, there had been only one fatal loss of a steamboat, that of the first Spokane in the 1880s on the Coeur d' Alene River, where five people had died.

=== Competition ===
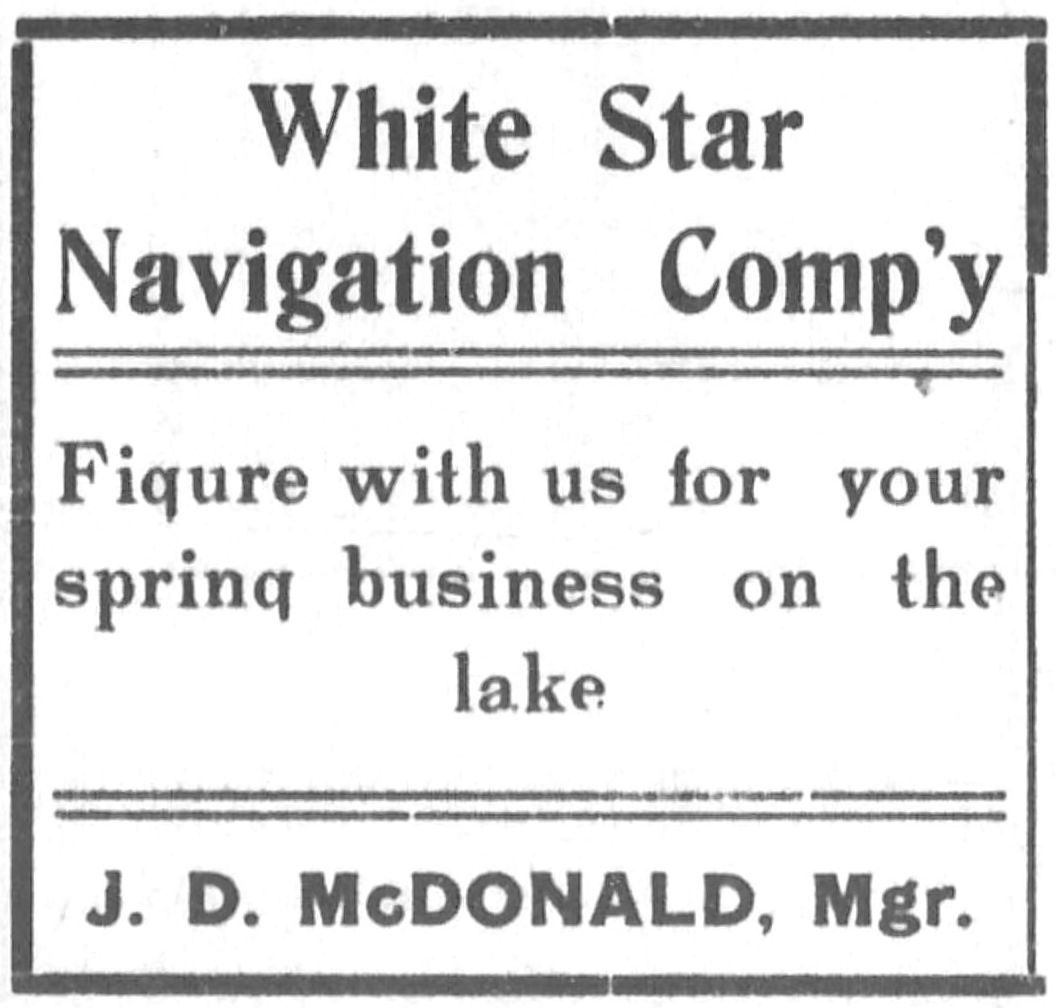
Advertisement for White Star Navigation Company, 1903

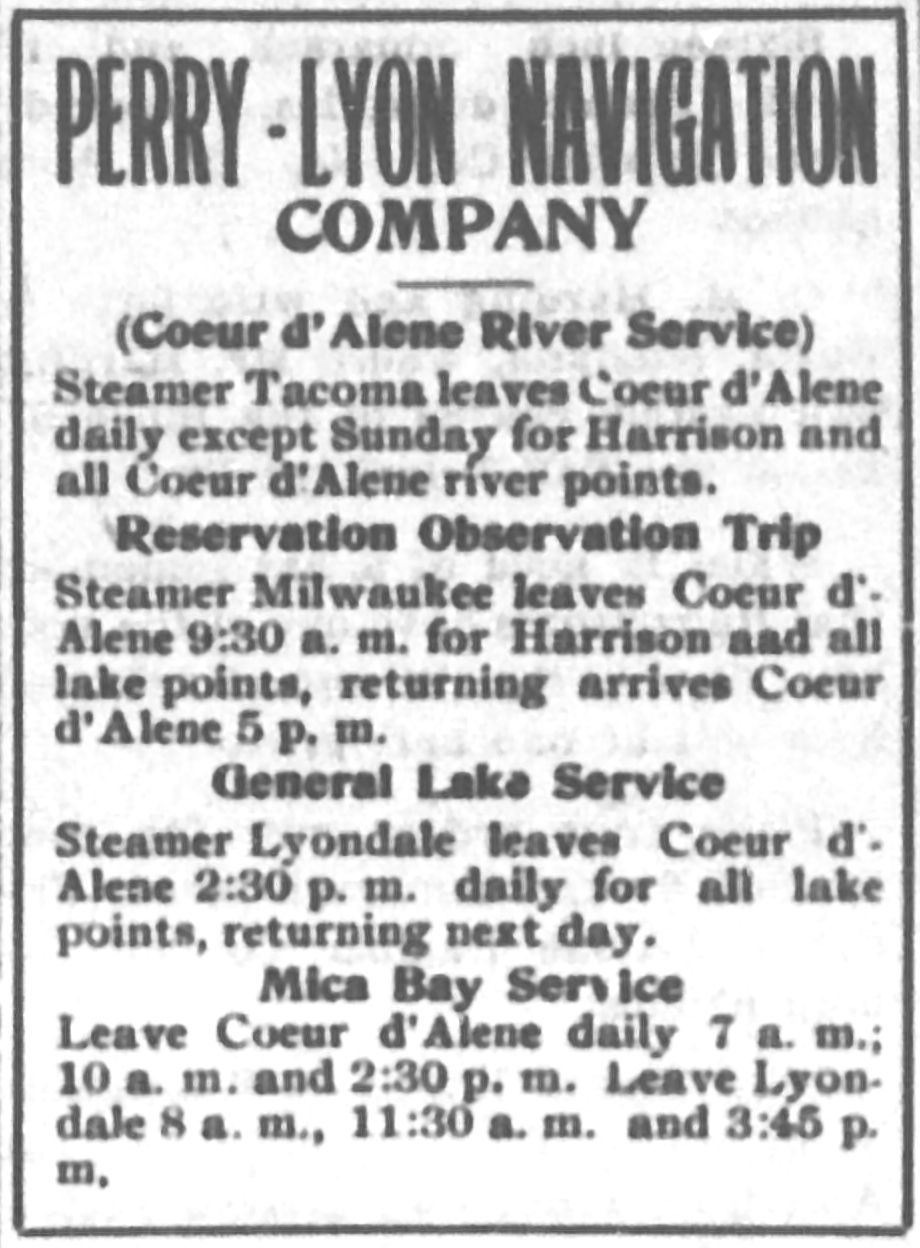
Advertisement for Perry-Lyon Navigation Company, 1903

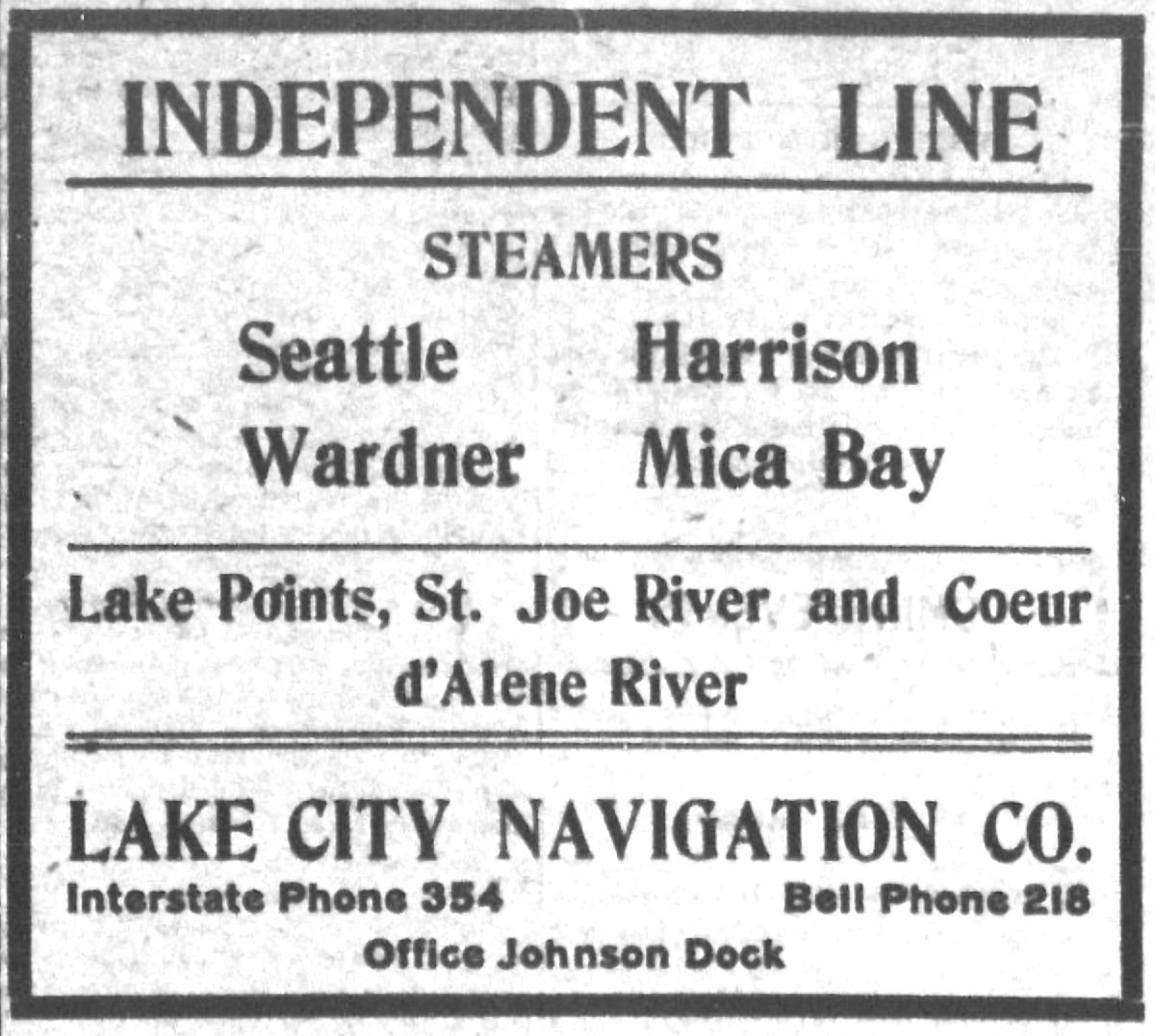
Advertisement for Lake City Navigation Company, 1909

In the early 1900s, there was an intense rivalry on the lake and the rivers between two companies. One concern was the Coeur d’Alene and St. Joe Transportation Company, later known as the Red Collar Line, which had been formed by Joseph Clarence "J.C." White and Jim Spaulding and his son, Harry. The other company was White Star Navigation Co., also known as the White Star Line, which had been incorporated by Capt. George Reynolds and McDonald.

In 1903, the Red Collar Line built the 147 foot long side-wheeler Idaho, which was described as "luxurious." In response, the White Star Line built the Boneta, originally 96 feet long, but later lengthened by 25 feet.

In 1905, while operating on the St. Joe River under the command of Captain Reynolds, Boneta was rammed and sunk by a rival steamer, the side-wheeler Idaho. This occurred just upriver from the O-W R & N bridge over the St. Joe River. Reynolds claimed that Idaho pursued him across the river with the intent of sinking Boneta. Capt. Jim Spaulding, of Idaho, said there was a confusion in signals.

A subsequent trial was not able to fix responsibility for the collision. Because the steamers on Lake Coeur d’Alene were not subject to the jurisdiction of the U.S. Steamboat Inspection Service, no government investigation was made into the collision. Boneta was raised and operating again for the White Star line in April 1907, making tri-weekly trips on the lake. In 1908, the White Star Navigation Company sold out to the Red Collar Line, which now achieved a virtual monopoly over transportation on the lake. Its fleet in 1908 comprised Idaho, Spokane, Colfax, Boneta, Flyer, Telephone, Georgie Oakes, North Star, and Milwaukie. The company also operated 14 barges as well as the tugs Rambler and Bonanza.

== Points on the route ==
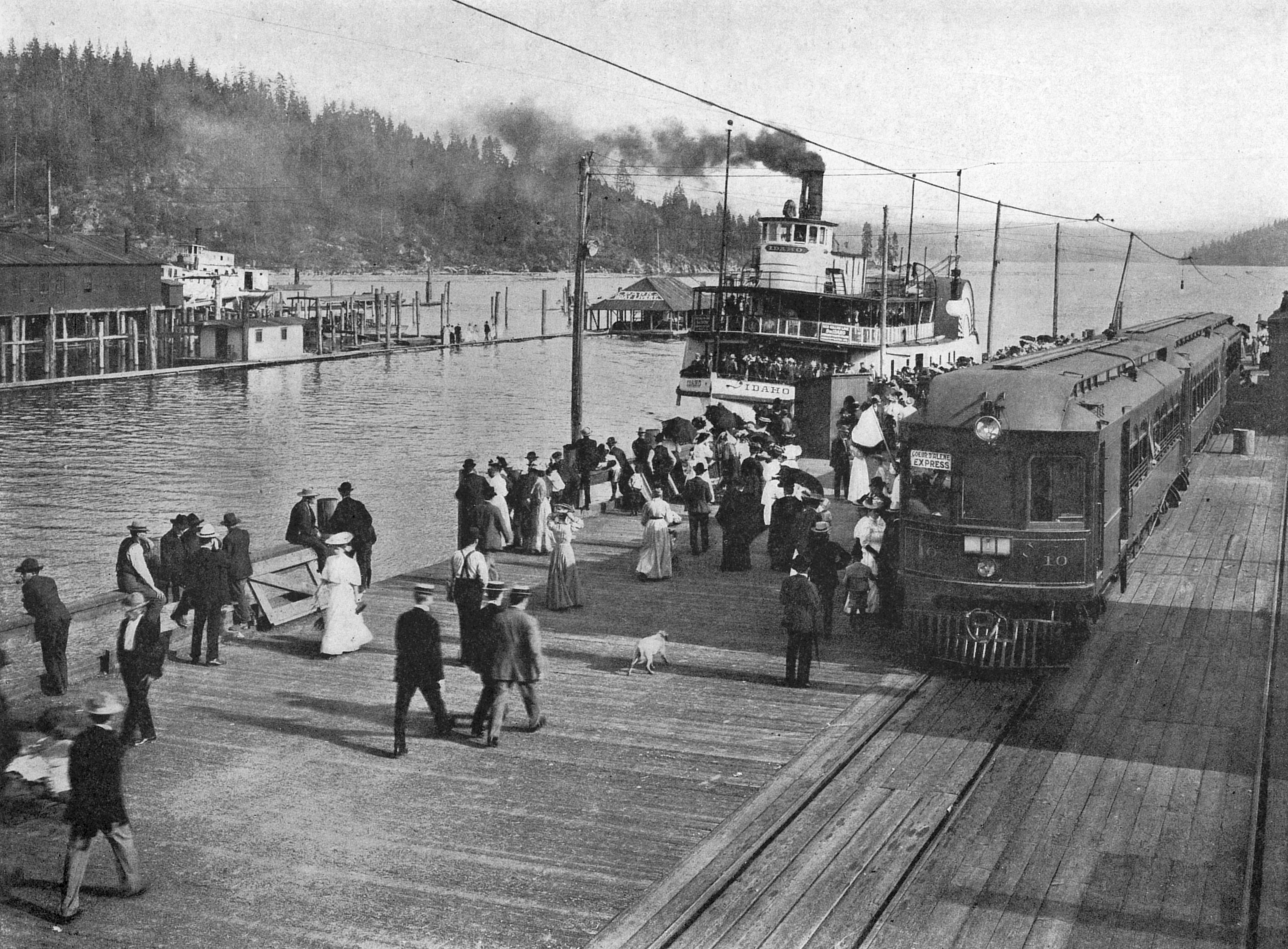
The Idaho at Coeur d'Alene, ca. 1908

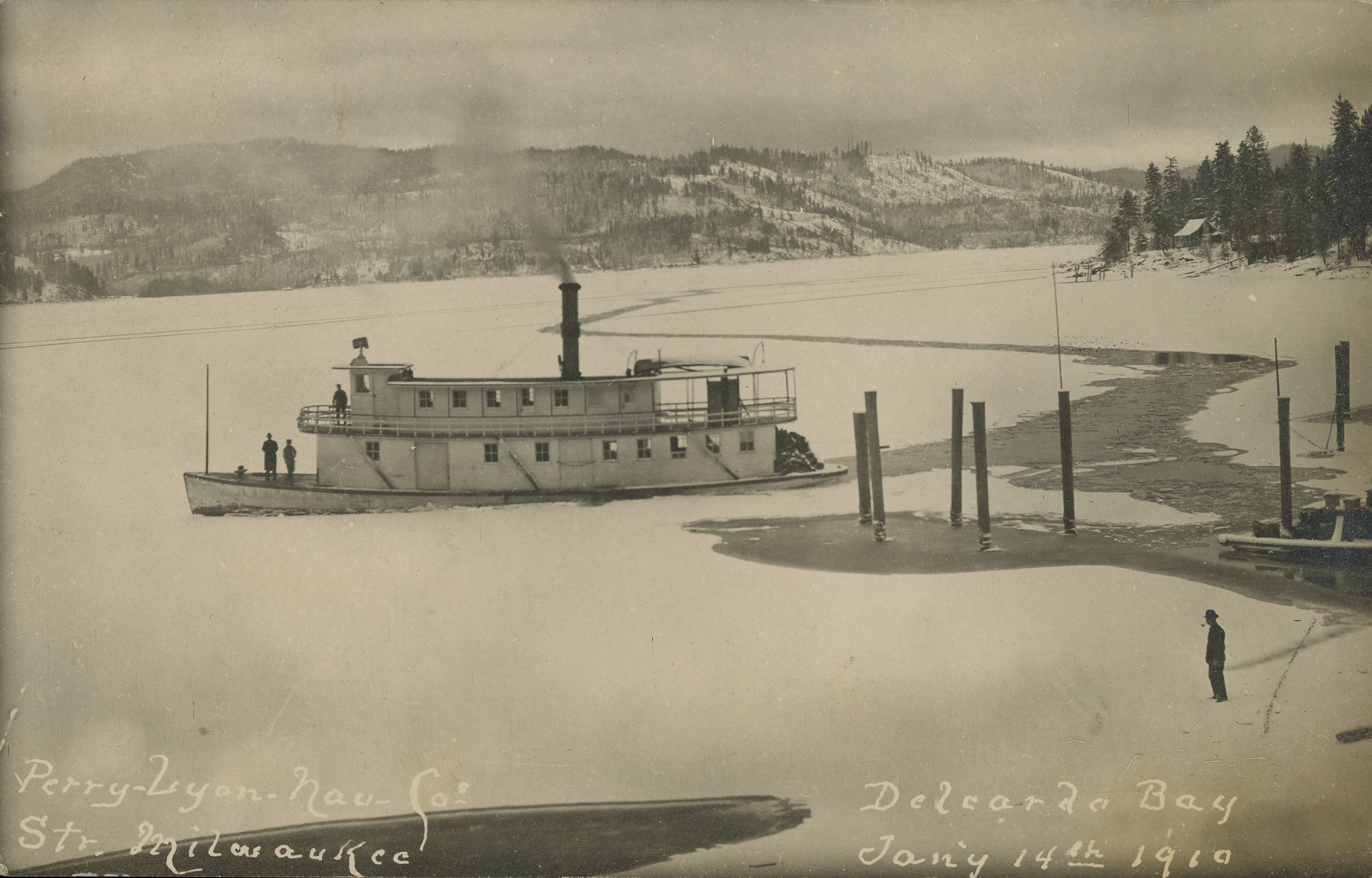
The Milwaukee at Delcardo Bay, 1910

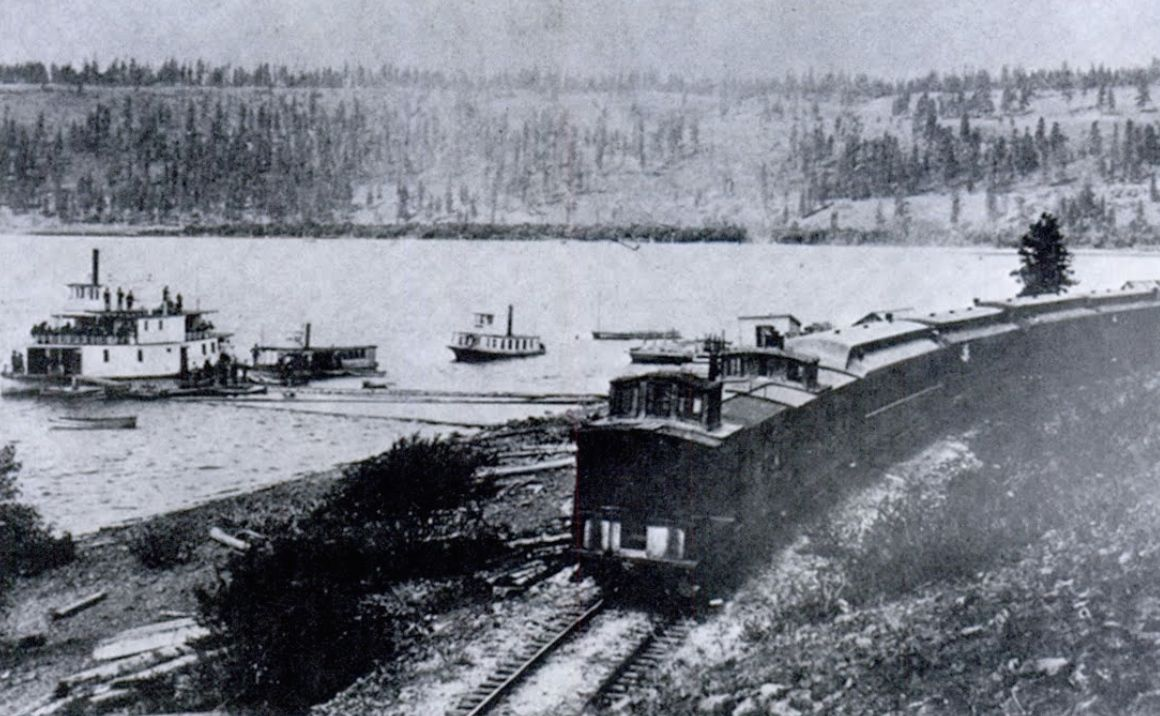
The Amelia Wheaton at Harrison, ca. 1890

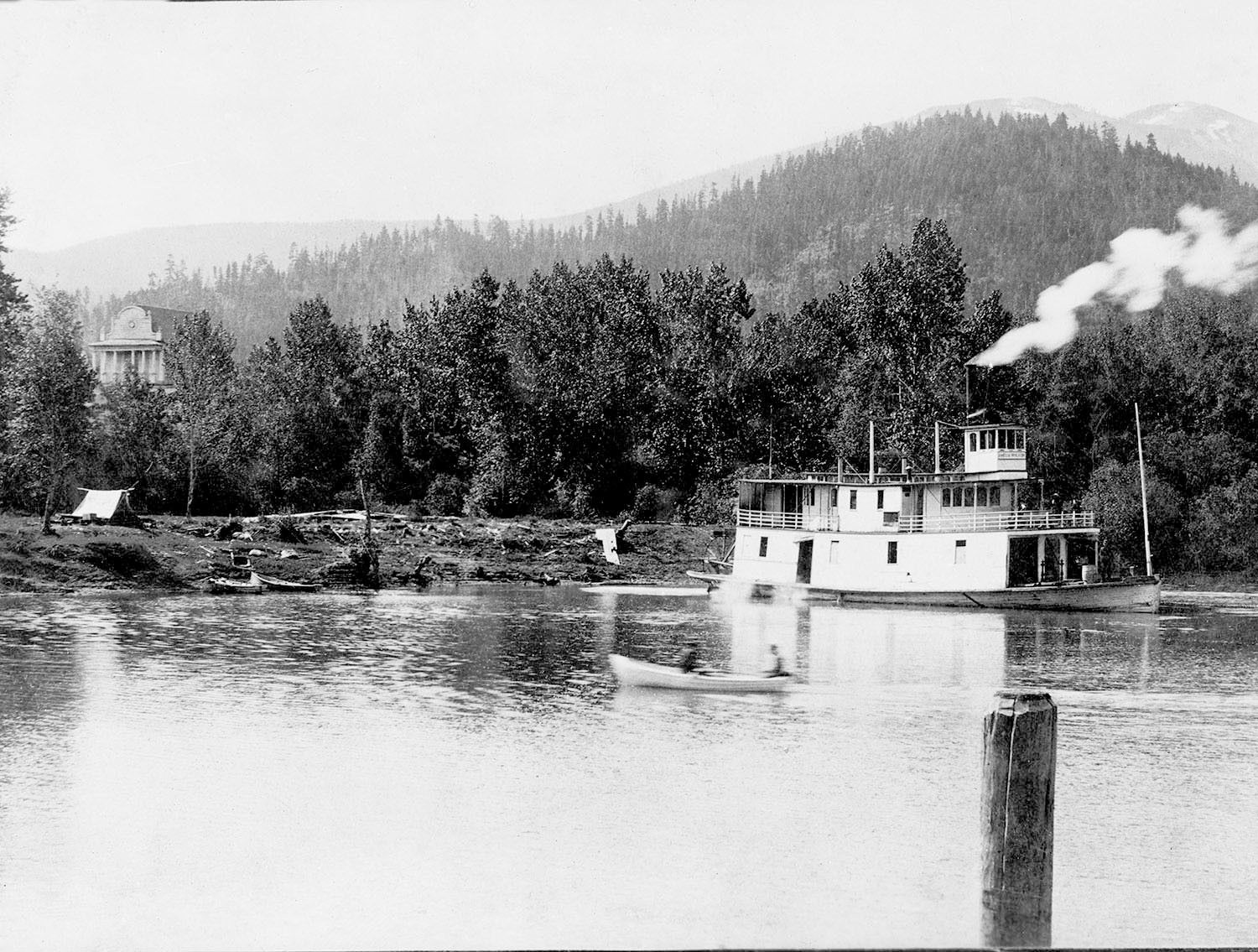
The Amelia Wheaton at the Old Mission ca. 1885

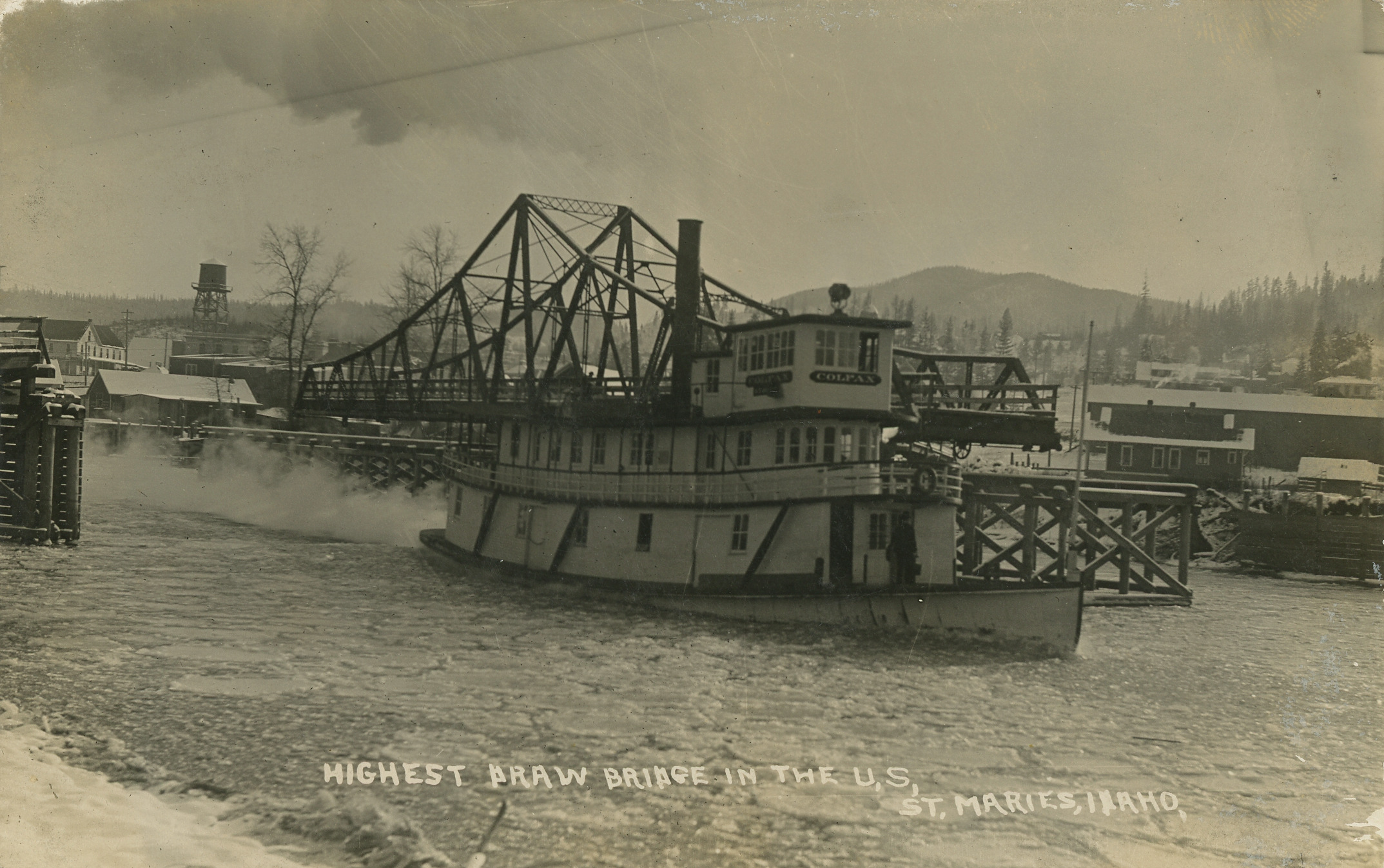
The Colfax at St. Maries, ca. 1910

=== West side ===
Starting with the city of Coeur d’Alene, on the west side of the lake from north to south were the following points: Coeur d’Alene (city). Cougar Creek, Casca Bay, Kid Island Bay, Mica Bay, Lyondale (as of 1912 terminus of railway leading west into Mica Mountains up Mica Creek), Del Cardo Bay, Loff's Bay, Len Landing, Black Rock, Rockford Bay, Windy Bay, Amwaco (a rail terminus after 1910), Farmington Landing, and Conkling Park and Hotel. Amwaco was the terminus of the Lake Creek and Coeur d'Alene Railroad, completed in 1910.

=== Saint Joe River ===
At the far southern end of the lake, flowing in from an easterly direction, was the Saint Joe River, which was navigable for some distance. The river was about 2,100 feet elevation above sea level, and it was claimed that it was the highest navigable river in the world.

The St. Joe River valley was about two miles wide where the river flowed into the lake, narrowing to about one-quarter mile at the head of navigation. Within the valley, the river itself was reported to be at least 150 feet wide and 20 feet deep.

Points on the river included Ramsdell, Hell's Gulch, Cosmos, St. Maries, Ducommon, St. Joe City, and Ferrell, or Ferrell's, generally considered the head of navigation on the St. Joe. However, in 1896, the steamer Elk, under the command of Captain Reynolds, was able to reach Cottonwood Island, twelve miles upriver from Ferrell's.

=== East side from south to Coeur d’Alene river ===
Starting from the mouth of the St. Joe River and moving from south to north, points on the lake included: Lacon and Harrison.

=== Harrison and the Coeur d’Alene River ===
Harrison was located at the mouth of the Coeur d'Alene River, which was navigable in part. Points on the river included Harrison was located at the mouth, then Springston, Medimont, Lane, Roselake, Dudley, Old Mission, Cataldo, Kingston, and, at the head of navigation, Enaville. In 1908, Harrison was described as "the gateway to the Coeur d’Alene mining district, which produces half the lead mined in the United States."

=== East side from Harrison to Coeur d’Alene City ===
East Point, Powderhorn Bay, Half Round Bay, Carlin Bay and Carlin Creek, Turner Bay and Turner Creek, Driftwood Point, Echo Bay, Squaw Bay (Neachen Bay), Hill, Wolf Lodge Bay, Beauty Bay, Wolf Lodge, Bennet Bay, Silver Beach, and Sanders Bay.

== Steamboat graveyard ==
Five or more steamboats are sunk in 30 to 45 feet of water at Stevens Point. These vessels are believed to be the remains of Bonanza, Colfax, Harrison, Samson, and St. Maries. All were deliberately sunk.

== Companies and shipyards ==
- Carscallen Bros. of Coeur d’Alene. Owned the sternwheeler Shoshone as of February 1909. In 1901, the brothers set up a lumber mill near Coeur d’Alene city, about a mile down the Spokane River.
- Coeur d’Alene & St. Joe Transportation Company Ltd. Formed in April 1903, with James H. "Jim" Spauding, president, J.C. White, vice-president; J.H. "Harry" Spauding, secretary and treasurer. These officers, together with Jonathan B. Goode and James H. Harte, formed the board of directors. All the founders were residents of Coeur d’Alene city. The company began the construction of the side-wheeler Idaho the same month. Rebuilt Volunteer as Belleville in 1895, and operated it with the steamer St. Joe. Later known as the Red Collar Line.
- Coeur d’Alene Transportation Company. Formally organized on December 16 by James Lotan, Z.J. Hatch, M.W. Henderson, and I.B. Sanborn. first vessel was the sternwheeler Coeur d’Alene. Irwin Sanborn was captain and Henry Pape was engineer on the Coeur d’Alene. Sanborn sold Coeur d’Alene to the Northern Pacific Railroad and built a replacement, Georgie Oakes.
- Lyon Navigation Company, organized in 1896 and had Defender built by P.W. Johnson. Also reported to be owned by Joseph Boughton in the early 1890s.
- Northern Pacific Railroad. Owned the Georgie Oakes in March 1893 (or before) until September 1907.
- Johnson Boat Works. Owned by Peter W. Johnson (1861–1951), an immigrant from Norway. Active in 1907. A successor to the Sorenson boat works, a new physical plant was built and completed in May 1893.
- People's Transportation Company (I). In June 1892, the first People's Transportation Company was incorporated, with capitalization of $50,000, comprising 1,000 shares at $50 each. The officers of the newly formed company were George B. Wonnacutt, president, George P. Mims, treasurer, and J.H. Brown, general manager. The board of directors was composed of Geo. B. Wannacott, Geo. P. Mims, J.W. Stearns, J.H. Brown, A.P. Powell, A.E. McCarty, and D.H Budlong Upon formation, the company intended to build a steamer as soon as possible, and build improved wharf facilities and interchange with the Union Pacific at Harrison. The company was reported to be active in October and November 1892, operating Volunteer. Was operating both Volunteer and Corwin (or Korwine) in early 1893.
- People's Transportation Company (II). The second People's Transportation Company was organized in early September 1907 by Capt. J.W. Koonley, Capt. George E. Reynolds, W.O. Applequist, and H.W. Wright, for the purpose of running a general passenger and freight business between Coeur d’Alene and the head of navigation. The new company acquired Boneta and Telephone, and, from the Carscallen Brothers, four barges.
- Lake City Navigation Company. Began freight and passenger operations on the lake and the Coeur d'Alene river in September 1909. Had its office at the Johnson Dock in Coeur d'Alene City. Operated four steamers in September 1909: Seattle, Harrison, Wardner, and Mica Bay. All property of Lake City Navigation Co. was purchased in April 1910, by the Perry-Lyon Navigation Co. for the price of $5,000. The assets purchased included the steamers Harrison, Hercules and three barges.
- Perry-Lyon Navigation Company. Formed in April 1909 by the merger of the former competitors, the Perry and the Lyon companies. The new concern would operate the Lyons boats (Tacoma and Lyondale) and the Perry boats (Milwaukee and Spray). Formally incorporated on April 19, 1910.
- Red Collar Line. Under J.C. White, manager, the Red Collar Line operated four boats in March 1908: Idaho, Colfax, Spokane, and North Star. Also operated two tugs, Bonanza and Rambler at same time, as well as nine barges. Was also operating Milwaukee on July 4, 1908.
- St. Joe Boom Company, a non-profit association for the purpose of organizing and sorting logs, set up in 1902 by F.J. Davies of the Rutledge Timber Company. Had the powerful 85 foot tug St. Joe built by P.W. Johnson, and later came to own four steam tugs, Bronc, Western, Samson, and ERT, as well as two gasoline-engined vessels, the tugs Lark and Powerful. The company owned 8,000 boom sticks (used to confine logs into towable log rafts) as well a barge which carried both a dredge and a pile driver.
- St. Joe Transportation Company. Owned Echo and Volunteer in 1890. May have encountered financial problems by late 1892, as had past due taxes owing to the City of Coeur d’Alene.
- White Star Navigation Company. Purchased Georgie Oakes in September 1907. J.D. McDonald, was the manager in late July 1907. In March 1908 owned Georgie Oaks, Flyer, Boneta and Telephone. Col. David P. Jenkins and Postmaster Milliard T. Hortson (or Hartson, of Spokane, held interests in the White Star line. In January 1908, Jenkins was the president of the line, and Hartson was the vice-president. Jenkins held the controlling interest in the White Star line. In April 1908, it was reported that J.C. White, manager of the Red Collar Line, had purchased the entire interest of Colonel Jenkins in the White Star line for a price of $42,500. This brought most of the freight and passenger traffic on the lake into the hands of the Red Collar line.

== List of captains and officers ==
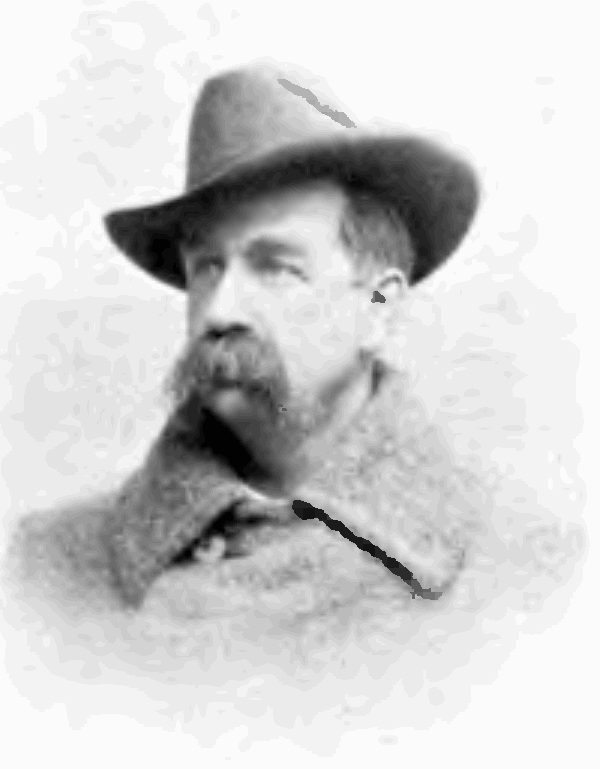
Z.J. Hatch, Captain of the Coeur d’Alene

- Adams, G.E., purser, North Star, March 1908.
- Amer, "Tex", cook on Georgie Oakes, 1908 or earlier, well known for his "lumberjack menu", which included, among other things, "Baa in the Rain" (mutton broth", "Prairie Rambler" (prime rib of beef", and "Grunt in the Orchard" (roast pork and applesauce).
- Backlund, Alf, captain, North Star, March 1908. Backlund had been a deep water sailor out of England for twelve years before coming to Lake Coeur d’Alene, where he owned five boats in five years before becoming captain of North Star.
- Bell, Fred C. (b.1867), engineer, served on Amelia Wheaton, Volunteer, Echo, General Sherman, Coeur d’Alene, Kootenai, Georgie Oakes, and others.
- Bennet, W.E., purser, Colfax, March 1908.
- Blaine, chief engineer, Boneta, March 1908.
- Campbell, J.L., pilot, Georgie Oakes, 1895.
- Cole, Joseph, purser, Idaho, March 1908.
- Darknell, Arthur A.
- Fairbank (or Fairbanks), Thomas, pilot, Idaho, 1903, captain, Flyer, March 1908.
- Falk, Carl, captain, Idaho, March 1908, also in June 1908.
- Ferrell, William. One of the earliest steamboat men on the lake, owned the steamer Ferrell in 1908.
- Forster, George M. A well-known Spokane attorney who owned Imp in 1903, and who bought Avondale in mid-summer of 1897 from C.B. King for use as a private yacht.
- Frederic, John, purser, Georgie Oakes, 1902.
- Fuller, C., chief engineer, Flyer, March 1908.
- Gates, Al, captain, Boneta, after March 1908. Originally from Portland, Oregon.
- Gray, William Polk (1845–1926), one of the best known steamboat men of the Pacific Northwest. Captain, Georgie Oakes, October 1902
- Groves, George W. (b.1867). Began marine service on steamer General Sherman, later on Amelia Wheaton, and Kootenai. Transferred to Georgie Oakes by 1895, and was still working on that vessel in 1907. Although he worked on the lake boats as for 50 years, because he had begun at age 17, he was always known as the "Kid Engineer."
- Hatch, Z.J. (1846–1913), worked on steamers on the Willamette River before coming to Idaho, where he built the Coeur d’Alene. Afterwards he returned to the Columbia River where with a partner he built the steamer Fleetwood, which he later took around to Puget Sound.
- Hill, Ray, purser, Flyer, March 1908.
- Johnson, Peter W. (1861–1951), captain, Defender, December 1897. Also the owner of Johnson Boat Works.
- Kent, James, engineer on Georgie Oakes.
- King, C.B., manager of five steamboats in April 1896: Elk, Sherman, Korwine, Belleville and Avondale.
- Knight, purser, Boneta, March 1908.
- Kopke, chief engineer, North Star, March 1908.
- Laird, Eli (or Ely) known as "Cap" or "Jake", born 1878, captain, Colfax, March 1908. Captain of George Oakes after 1908, said to be "colorful" and "profane." Laird was captain of Flyer in June 1908 and also in March 1910. When he ran Georgie Oakes on excursions, people would ride the steamer just to hear Laird's tall tales. Once in a court proceeding, Laird's testimony was offered as an expert in the value of lowland hay. The opponent's lawyer objected to Laird's qualifications as a hay expert "because in all his life he has been engaged in steamboating and telling stories to passengers up and down the lake and St. Joe river."
- Laird, Levi, chief engineer, Colfax, March 1908. Twin brother of Eli Laird.
- Laws, Walter, chief engineer, Idaho, March 1908.
- Lawson, M.W., second engineer, Idaho, 1903.
- Lyon, J. Herbert, captain and boat builder, came to Coeur d’Alene in 1892. The settlement of Lyondale, on Mica Bay, was named after him. Built Defender, Victorine, Queen, and Lyondale. Lyon was reported to have mysteriously disappeared for six months in 1897, and only returning in March 1897 with no memory of where he been, until he somehow recovered his senses in a small town in southern California.
- Megquier, C., purser, Colfax, March 1908.
- Moody, captain of Volunteer during the 1890s.
- Nelson, Frank, chief engineer, Colfax, March 1908.
- Nesbitt, William, captain, Georgie Oakes, 1896.
- Pape, Henry, engineer, Georgie Oakes.
- Profitt, E.J. (d.1950), purser, Georgie Oakes, March 1908, a popular man who worked for the Red Collar line for 30 years.
- Reeve, G.H., captain, Boneta, 1908 and before, promoted to manager of the White Star Line, March 1908.
- Reynolds, George E. (b.1853). A native of Maine, Reynolds worked on seagoing vessels until coming to the Pacific Northwest, where he began working on the Willamette River on Bonanza as a deckhand. Later Reynolds rose to captain, serving as master on the Willamette River steamers Champion, Occident and Orient. Reynolds came to Coeur d'Alene in about 1888, where he ran the steamers Coeur d'Alene, Kootenai, General Sherman, and, in 1895, St. Joe. In 1896 he was captain of Elk. Georgie Oakes, 1897 and also in 1907. Reynolds was captain of Colfax in 1901, at which time he was the senior steamboat captain on the lake. Commanded Georgie Oakes in June 1908.
- Sanborn, Irwin B., captain, Georgie Oakes, 1892-1896 Also navigated St. Joe for several years in the 1890s.
- Shallis, J.I., purser, Georgie Oakes, 1895 (or before) to 1902.
- Shuck, Ed., navigated St. Joe for several years in the 1890s.
- Sorensen, Peter C. (1833–1918), boatbuilder. Also referred to as C.P. Sorenson. He was a Norwegian immigrant, came to Coeur d'Alene area in 1879, built Amelia Wheaton for the government. Active until 1892, when business sold to Peter W. Johnson.
- Spauding, James H. "Jim", captain and co-owner, Idaho, 1903, father of J.H. "Harry" Spaulding.
- Spauding, J.H., purser, Idaho, 1903.
- White, James Clarence, generally referred to as J.C. White, originally a railroad engineer from Colorado.
- Taylor, A.C., commanded Boneta in June 1908.
- Williams, Otis, commanded Colfax in June 1908.
- Wilson, A.B., captain, Spokane, March 1908.
- Wilson, Fred, captain, Bellville, December 1897. operated as Defender in December 1897 or earlier. Also served as engineer on Georgie Oakes. Served on lake boats for forty years, as deckhand, fireman, engineer, and captain.
- Wilson, Mont, captain, Rambler, June 1908.

== List of vessels ==
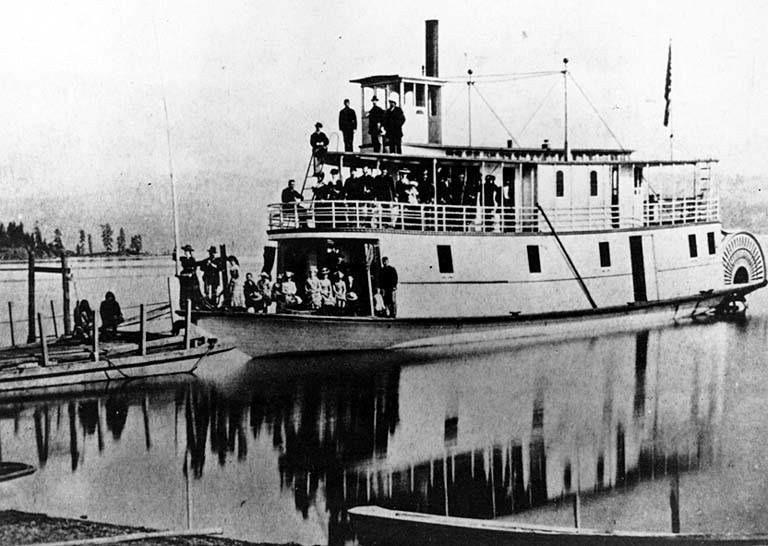
Amelia Wheaton, circa 1885.

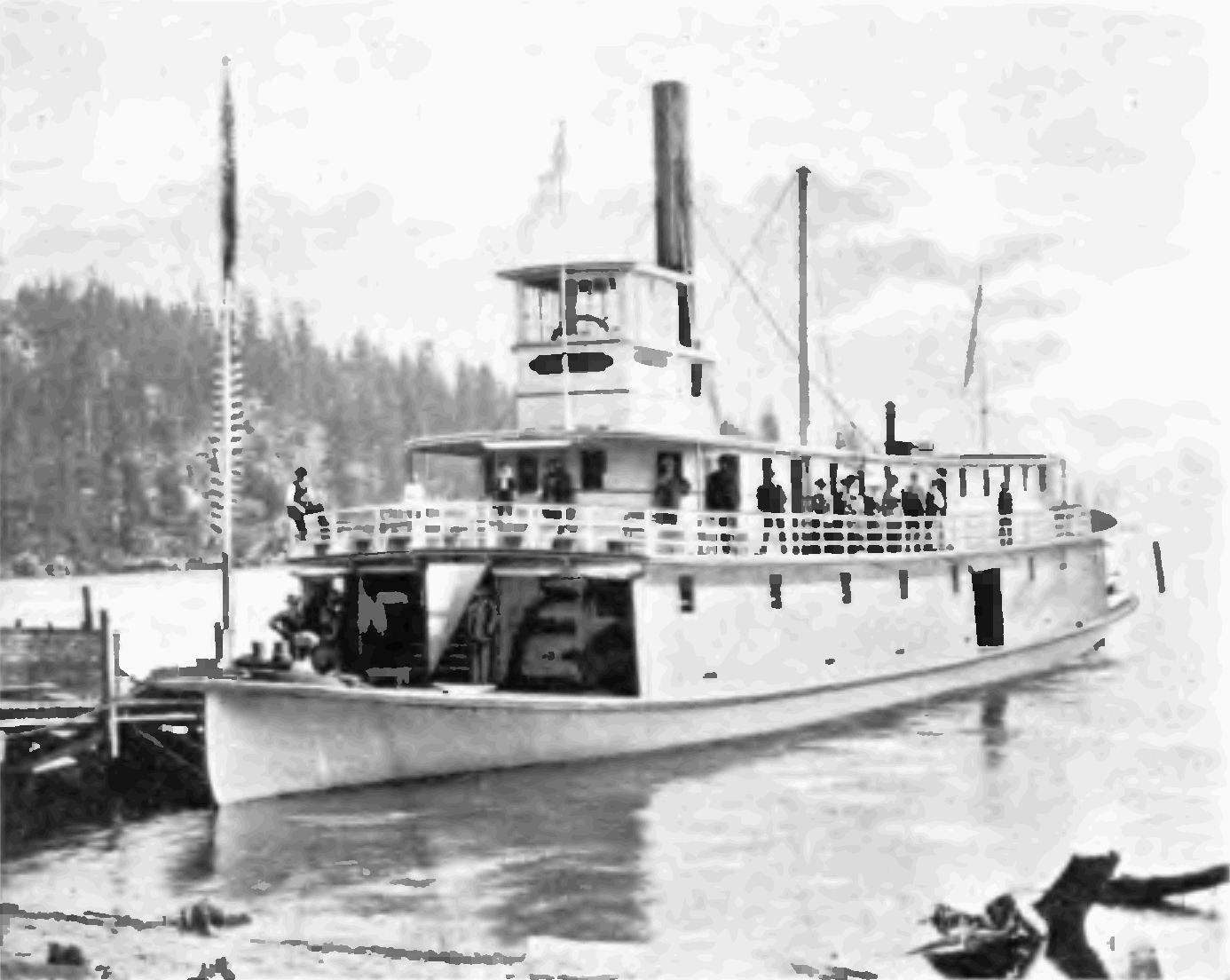
Coeur d'Alene, circa 1895.

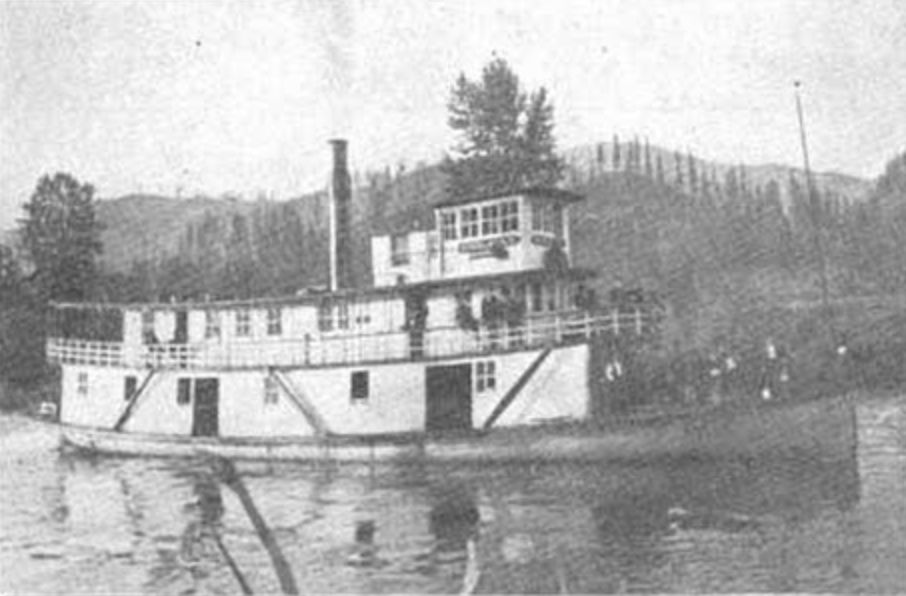
Colfax, circa 1908

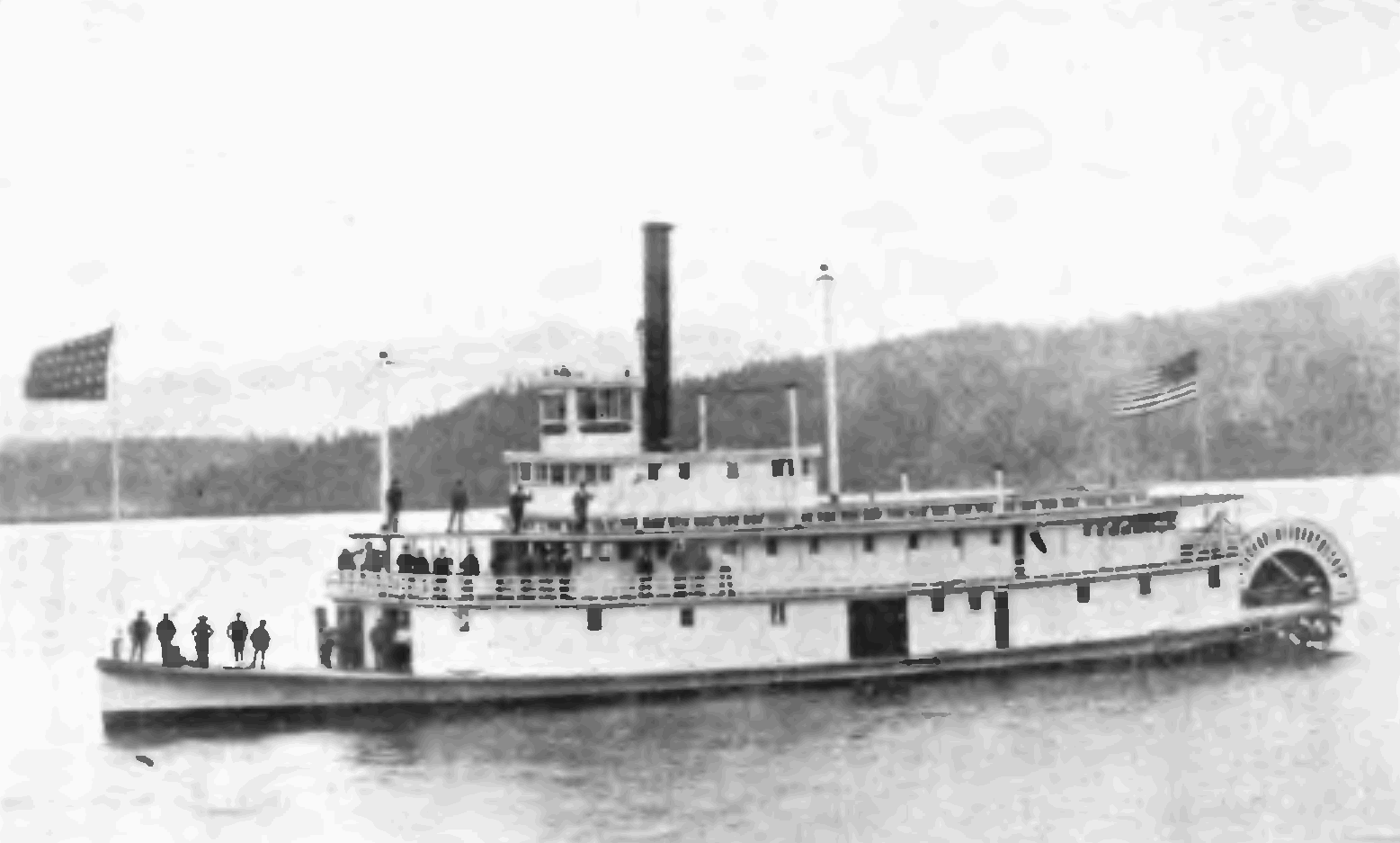
Georgie Oakes, circa 1895

- Amelia Wheaton, sternwheeler, was the first steamer to operate on Lake Coeur d’Alene. Amelia Wheaton was built for the U.S. Army by C.P. Sorenson. Construction began in 1878, and after many difficulties in obtaining materials and components, was finally completed in late 1880. The steamer was named after a daughter of the post commander. The first pilot of the Wheaton was Private William J. Applebee, who had had 14 years experience in the navy. Sorenson himself was made the first captain of the steamer. Dimensions of the Wheaton vary. According to one non-contemporaneous source, Wheaton was 86 feet long (exclusive of fantail), 14 feet beam. Another source gives a length of 100 feet long and 16 feet beam, which would likely have included the fantail and the guards.). An 1888 source is perhaps most reliable, as it is a listing of the steamer for sale by the government. According to this source, the Wheaton was 76 feet long, with a beam of 17 feet, and depth of hold of 4 feet. In 1888, the lower cabin measured 8x14x57 feet. The upper cabin measured 7.5x14x30 feet. Twin steam engines each had an 8-inch bore and a 24-inch stroke. The engines generated about 40 horsepower in 1888. The steamer's speed was said to be between 8 and 10 miles per hour. Built by P.C. Sorenson. Amelia Wheaton was formally purchased by the government on August 24, 1880, for a price of $8,000. The Wheaton was however little used for the rest of the fiscal year, with operating expenses totally only $165. Sold to private parties in 1888. The sale was advertised as taking place on May 19, 1888, at 11:00 a.m., at Fort Sherman. Removed from service in 1892, engines to sternwheeler St. Joe, hull abandoned. Sometimes referred to as simply the Wheaton.
- Avondale, steam launch. One of five steamers managed by C.B. King in April 1896. Spokane attorney George M. Forster, who owned Imp in 1903, bought Avondale in mid-summer of 1897 from C.B. King for use as a private yacht. In operation July 4, 1899. C.B. King is reported to have used Avondale on Hayden Lake before bringing the vessel to Lake Coeur d’Alene.
- Belleville, rebuilt from Volunteer, using the same cabins and pilothouse, by Johnson & Sorenson, launched Wednesday, June 26, 1895. Length 58 feet, beam 9 feet, engines developed 12 horsepower. Fred Wilson was the first captain of Belleville. Operational in December 1897 One of five steamers managed by C.B. King in April 1896.
- Bessie, Operational as of April 1905, in the Harrison area. Built by Johnson Boat Works.
- Biddie was, owned by Carl Searles, became in 1933 the last steamboat to offer passenger service on Lake Coeur d’Alene.
- Bonanza, tug, operated by Red Collar Line in March 1908. Deliberately sunk at Three Mile Point.
- Boneta, sternwheeler, built by Johnson Boat Works and launched October 1904. Originally Boneta was 96 feet long with a beam of 18 feet. There were guards extending two feet out from the deck along the upper sides of the hull. Boneta was lengthened by 25 feet in 1906, also at Johnson Boat Works. Acquired by People's Transportation Line (II) in September 1907. Owned by George Reynolds and E. Daniel McDonald, of the White Star Navigation Company in March 1908.
- Bonnie Doone, in operation July 4, 1899. Built by Johnson Boat Works. Owned by H.M. Strathern of the Post Falls Lumber Company.
- Clipper. Deliberately burned on the lake in 1938.
- Colfax, propeller, 100 feet long, built by Johnson Boat Works in 1902. Colfax was similar design to Spokane, but slightly larger. Both were shallow-draft steamers built to service the flourishing white pine lumber trade on the lake. Both Colfax and Spokane were operated by captains George Reynolds and E.D. McDonald. Colfax could carry 50 tons of ore. In 1903, Colfax, under ownership of Reynolds & McDonald competed with the newly built Idaho, but was soon acquired by Idaho's owners, the Coeur d’Alene & St. Joe Transportation Company, later known as the Red Collar Line. Made daily or alternate daily trips on the lake in April 1907 for the Red Collar Line in conjunction with steamer Wallace. Operated by Red Collar Line in March 1908. Deliberately sunk at Three Mile Point.
- Coeur d'Alene, sternwheeler, built in 1883 by Capt. Z.J. Hatch (b.1846), of Portland, Oregon, dismantled 1892. One hundred twenty (120) feet long and 14 feet beam. (Alternative dimensions: 140 long, 26 foot beam, 6.4 foot depth of hold. Coeur d'Alene made its first trip on April 2, 1884, up the lake from Coeur d'Alene city to Kingston, which was past the Old Mission on the St. Joe River. Coeur d’Alene was intended to transport ore from the mines of the Coeur d’Alene area. Proved to be a very lucrative boat, with net earnings sometimes $2,000 per trip. Coeur d’Alene cost $24,800 to build, and with freight rates at $40 per ton, the steamer was able to pay for itself after 90 days of operations. Sold in 1884 to D.C. Corbin interests, sold again in 1888 to the Northern Pacific Railroad. Abandoned in 1890, with machinery and superstructure being used for Georgie Oakes. Old hull tied to a piling near the Johnson Boat House at Coeur d’Alene city, where it sank.
- Corwin, built in 1888 for Superintendent Jones of the Spokane water department. Had a shallow draft for operating on the Spokane river, but was later transferred to Lake Coeur d’Alene. Work was reported to have been completed as of April 1, 1892 on this steamer, with the vessel scheduled to go into regular service up the St. Joe River on Monday, April 4, 1892. Owned by People's Transportation Co. in early 1893. Sunk in shallow water by storm in early February 1893 while moored overnight at Coeur d’Alene city. One of five steamers managed by C.B. King in April 1896. Also seen spelled Corwine and Korwine.
- Defender ex Laura Lyons, propeller, cabin on main deck, pilot house on cabin roof. Built by J. Herbert Lyon. Launched 1895 as Laura Lyon, renamed Defender in 1897 after purchase by Peter W. Johnson, became part of a new company, Johnson Navigation Company. P.W. Johnson sold a half-interest in Defender in 1899 to A.B. Allen, and, the next year, sold the remaining half to A.A. Darknell. By 1901, Defender was reported to be the property of A. Buckland and William Crane, who were using it to make daily trips between Coeur d’Alene city and Harrison. Also reported to be owned by Joseph Boughton in the early 1890s.
- Dewey. Built as a shallow draft vessel with the hope of being able to proceed above St. Joe on the St. Joe River, but could not proceed beyond Little Falls. Offered for sale in July 1903, by Henry Krotzer, along with the steamer Zora, "at low prices.
- Dolphin. Operational in June 1905, carrying excursions brought in by train from Spokane. Dolphin also carried excursions in the summer of 1906, including a moonlight cruise on August 30, for the Young People's Society of the Swedish Lutheran church, to Beauty Bay where bonfires were lit and people sang. In April 1907, it was reported that Dolphin, then belonging to Captain McDonald of the White Star Navigation Company, would be overhauled at the Johnson Boat Works to meet the requirements of the U.S. Steamboat Inspection Service. The plan, as reported at the time, was that once the repairs were complete, the boat would be taken to Lake Pend Oreille and then to the Pend Oreille River, where it would be used to carry passengers and mail.
- Eagle.
- Echo, propeller. A small vessel, only forty (40) feet long with a beam of 6 feet, Echo was built by Sorenson for Capt. Ed Shuck in the late 1880s. Owned by St. Joe Transportation Company in 1890. Also reported to be owned by Joseph Boughton in the early 1890s. In 1886, Echo was the first steamer to establish regular (tri-weekly) commercial service on the lake, from Coeur d’Alene City to St. Joe.
- Edna, steam launch. Advertised in April 1892 as departing Coeur d’Alene docks for Lake View Park daily at 10:00 a.m., Joe Boughton, proprietor, for a fare of 25 cents. Boughton was the owner of Lake View Park in the early 1890s. Edna operated on the lake for about 15 years. Said to have been the first pleasure vessel on the lake.
- Elk ex St. Joe, sternwheeler. Originally St. Joe, rebuilt with new machinery in 1896 and renamed Elk. Made first run as Elk on Sunday, April 5, 1896, with 100 passengers on board. Active in June 1896, under Captain Reynolds. Made connections at Harrison, Idaho with the O.R.&N train to the mines. In 1900, Elk was dismantled, and the machinery, fittings and superstructure were shipped to Lake Pend Oreille to be installed on the sternwheeler Pend Oreille.
- Ferrell. Sternwheeler, 80 feet long, built circa 1906 for William W. Ferrell for service on the St. Joe River. Ferrell was operational as of in 1908.
- Fleetwood, steam launch, owned by W.U. Casey, made trial trip on May 4, 1900. Converted to a liquor transportation barge. Reportedly "there was nothing fleet about this boat, however; the and a long flat bottom and the men called her 'Duck Butt.'"
- Flyer, propeller, 132 feet long, 18 foot beam, with a draft of 8.5 feet. Built in 1906 for the White Star Navigation Company by Johnson Boat Works. Modeled after the famous and successful Puget Sound steamer Flyer. Launched on the afternoon of Thursday, October 11, 1906, Flyer had a successful 30 year career on the lake. Flyer when launched was the largest propeller-driven vessel on the lake. Flyer could carry 700 passengers. Made daily trips on the lake in April 1907 for the White Star line. Owned by White Star Navigation Company in March 1908. Reported to be capable of making 20 mlles an hour upon completion. Flyer was last operated in 1936 on excursions to St. Maries under Capt. Claude Barnes. Flyer was deliberately burned on the lake in 1938.
- General Sherman, a small propeller-driven steamer built in 1884, by C.P. Sorenson, C.B. King, and James Monaghan, and put on the run up the Coeur d'Alene River to the Old Mission. Hull abandoned after removal of machinery, and sunk near the Northern Pacific dock in Coeur d’Alene city until 1894, when it was raised in 1894 by Irwin B. Sanborn, E.A. McCarty, and F.A. Shallis, who installed machinery again and ran the vessel for several years on the St. Joe River. In use for excursion work as of June 15, 1895. May have been one of five steamers managed by C.B. King in April 1896. Possibly still in operation as of July 4, 1899. Machinery to Schley in 1899, hull deliberately sunk in same year. Possibly also referred to as simply the Sherman.
- Georgie Oakes, sternwheeler, built in 1890 (one source) or 1892 (another source) by Sorenson and Johnson for the Northern Pacific Rallroad. 150 feet long (not counting fantail) and 28 feet beam, alternatively 160 feet long and 26 feet beam, or 163.5 feet long and 30 feet beam. Designed by Capt. Irwin B. Sanborn, who also supervised construction. Part of the superstructure came from the steamer Coeur d’Alene. Twin steam engines were 16 inch bore and 72 inch stroke. Could carry 100 tons of ore. Frequently worked on Sunday excursions. One of the fastest steamers in the Pacific Northwest, and capable of making 18 miles an hour. Rebuilt in 1908 at cost of $10,000. Removed from service in 1917, operated intermittently until 1920. Boilers were coal fired in 1903. Deliberately burned in 1927 at Fourth of July celebration.
- Golden Star, Golden Star was built in 1937 by Andrew Knudson as a steam tug. She was propeller driven and worked Coeur d'Alene Lake and the Coeur d'Alene River area primarily around Springston. She was later (1945) renovated to a diesel driven tug. Her steam machinery was removed and installed in the sawmill at Springston to dive a conveyor belt. The remnants of the Golden star are located on the bank near the old town site of Springston. ID a few miles upstream from Harrison, ID on the Coeur d'Alene River. (http://www.harrisonidaho.org/springston-was-here.html
- Grant.
- Harrison, propeller. Operated by Lake City Navigation Company in September 1909.
- Harrison (1912), sternwheeler, built in 1912 at Lacon for the Oregon-Washington Railway & Navigation Company. Shuttled passengers and freight across the lake from Harrison on the east side to Amwaco on the west side, where a rail connection existed to Spokane. Harrison often raced against the Georgie Oakes. Burned at Brautigan's dock in Coeur d’Alene sometime in the 1920s. Boilers were coal-fired in 1903 or earlier. Also reported to have been deliberately sunk at Three Mile Point.
- Hercules.
- Idaho, sidewheeler, 147 feet long, 23 feet beam (measured over the hull). Measured over the main deck, including the guards, the beam was 40 feet. Idaho was built in 1903 by George Ryan and his crew from Oshkosh, Wisconsin for the Coeur d’Alene and St. Joe Transportation Co. Ltd. Reportedly launched February 20, 1903 but this cannot be correct, because construction was only started on April 17, 1903. The hull was launched on June 20, 1903. Idaho cost $45,000 to build. Another source reports that Idaho was built by J.C. White and J.H. "Jim" Spaulding and his son Henry "Harry" Spaulding. Idaho's engines generated 800 horsepower while turning side-wheels 22 feet in diameter. The steamer could carry 1,000 passengers. The engines were of an older "clack valve" type, and had been originally installed on a Mississippi river steamer. Capable of 15 miles per hour speed. Idaho made the 48 mile run from Coeur d’Alene city to St. Joe in three hours ten minutes, including a stop along the way at Harrison. Operated by Red Collar Line in March 1908. Caught fire at Blackrock Bay and burned in 1915 when out of service and being used as a warehouse during the apple harvest.
- Imp. Owned by George M. Forster. Burned in 1903, but machinery salvaged to be installed in a replacement vessel to be built in Tacoma, Washington. By April 1907 Imp was owned by summer resident Mrs. Forster, with the steamer being scheduled for an overhaul.
- Irene, steam launch. Formerly known as Spokane, this vessel was renamed after having been raised after an April 1887 sinking involving the drowning of several passengers. Irene was purchased by James Fairbank in April 1892, and operated daily from Harrison on the St. Joe to Coeur d’Alene City route. By 1893, Irene was owned by Peter W. Johnson the boat builder. In January 1893, Irene had been hauled out to be prepared for the coming season on the lake, with a new hull being built for the steamer.
- Julietta, steam launch. Leased by Lieutenant Brook, of Fort Sherman, in early August 1896, with George Groves as engineer. In operation July 4, 1899.
- Kootenai, built in 1887, and was at the time the most powerful steamer on the lake, Kootenai carried ore from the mines to Coeur d'Alene city, where it was shipped by rail for refining. To break ice, the hull was built of heavy planking sheathed with boiler plate. Kootenai could break 10 inches of ice and still proceed at a good pace, or 20 inches at a slower rate. Still in service as of February 1893. When the O.R.&N rail line was completed into the mining district in 1890, ore shipments on the lake fell off. After being tied up for a year or two, the machinery was removed, and the unpowered hulk was sold to an attorney in the Harrison area, A.A. Crane. This proved to be an unprofitable venture for Crane, who returned to legal work, and, later, was elected to the state legislature. Kootenai was deliberately sunk at Three Mile Point, in 1898.
- Laura Lyon. Built by Sorenson and Johnson in 1895 (or, by another report, by J. Herbert Lyon.) purchased by Peter W. Johnson in 1897, to form a new company, Johnson Navigation Company. Also reported to have been built in 1890. Sixty (60) feet long with a beam of 11 feet. Renamed Defender two years after being built.
- Lyondale. Built by J. Herbert Lyon. Made daily trips on the lake in April 1903. In late July 1907, Lyondale departed the Electric Dock at 10:00 a.m. daily for Mica Bay, and returned to Coeur d'Alene City at 1:30 p.m. This was advertised as "the scenic trip on the lake." Substantially rebuilt in early 1908 at Johnson's Boat Works.
- Mica Bay. Operated by Lake City Navigation Company in September 1909.
- Michigan. Owned by Joseph Fisher in October 1896. On Monday, October 19, 1896, Michigan sank on the St. Joe River with 30 tons of hay on board.
- Milwaukie, propeller, lower and upper cabins, pilot house on second deck, forward of upper cabin, slightly elevated above deck. Eighty-eight (88) feet long, Milwaukie was built in 1908. According to one source, Milwaukie was built for the Red Collar line. According to another source, Milwaukie was built for the St. Joe River Freight Service and acquired by the Red Collar Line shortly after completion. Advertised as part of the Perry steamboat concern in 1909. According to another report, Milwaukie was built for the Blackwell Lumber Company for passenger and freight and, after being used as a tugboat, was rebuilt as Bonnie Doone.
- Miss Spokane, 120 feet long passenger vessel built in 1917 by the Red Collar Line to replace Georgie Oakes. Described as "luxurious and fast", Miss Spokane was driven by twin propellers, each turned by a 300-horsepower Winton gasoline engine. The Red Collar Line intended to use the vessel to compete with the O-W R.& N. company's trains and its steamer, the sternwheeler Harrison. However, Miss Spokane turned out to be expensive to operate, and the design was unsuitable for the lake, so after one year of operation, the vessel was removed from service, and was later converted to an excursion barge. Although the boat cost $45,000, its design was inspired by New York Harbor boats, which wasn't right for the lake, for example, its propellers were constantly being damaged by logs. Floated for a long time unused at a dock in Coeur d’Alene, until 1943, when the hulk was towed off to a beach and abandoned. Later it was burned.
- Mudhen. Owned by a man named Billings, who was facetiously called "Commodore" in at least one report, Mud Hen appears to have been based out of St. Maries in May 1892. According to one historian, Mudhen's only claim to fame was that she capsized during a windstorm in 1892 and nearly drowned Captain Billings and his family."
- North Star, built in 1906 by the Johnson Boat Works. Designed by P.C. Sorenson, and cost over $10,000. Ninety (90) feet long with a 14 foot beam, powered by a 100 horsepower steam engine, capable of driving the vessel at an average speed of 14 miles per hour. North Star had full electric lighting throughout the vessel. Construction was supervised by Capt. Alf Backlund (or Baklund). Operated by Red Collar Line in March 1908. Destroyed in 1929 by accidental fire when moored at St. Joe. Was owned by J.C. White and later by Fred Herrick.
- Powerful, tug, probably steam-powered originally, but eventually reported to be driven by a gasoline engine. Underwent substantial overhaul in late 1905 at the Johnson Boat Works.
- Queen. Built by J. Herbert Lyon. Could move five carloads of freight at once, with a barge lashed on to each side, and pushing another barge ahead.
- Radio, the last boat built by J.C. White, it ran to Camp Sweyolakan, the Camp Fire Girls camp at Mica Bay. Deliberately sunk in 1943 after being unused for a long time.
- Rambler, steam tug, operated by Red Collar Line in March 1908. Was also used to carry passengers on Sunday excursions, round-trip fare $1.25.
- Reliance, steam launch, owned by the Gunderson Lumber Company, operational as of 1905.
- Rob Roy. Steam launch, Placed in service in the summer of 1905. Passenger capacity claimed to be 50 "with perfect safety." Rob Roy was built by John C. Rosen & Company for H.M. Strathern, described as "the sawmill man of Post Falls." Rob Roy was 58 feet long with a beam of 8.5 feet. It was equipped with a 50 horsepower steam engine, which could drive the launch at a speed of 14 miles an hour. For passengers, there were "open cabins" fore and aft. The steamer would be available for charter by the hour or by the day. G. Grenum was also the agent for the launch, which was advertised to be available for excursion parties, towing and barge work.
- Romeo in operation July 4, 1899.
- Rose Lake, steam tug, built by Johnson Boat Works.
- Rover. Operating in November 1906, for excursion work.
- Samson, tug. Deliberately sunk at Three Mile Point.
- Sassacus, steam launch, operational in May 1897, owned by Captain Sischo.
- Schley propeller, built by Samuel Smith, David Groves, and Fred F. Wilson, under the direction of Sorenson, using the machinery from General Sherman. Schley, launched in May 1898, was 75 feet long and had a beam of 14.5 feet. Had a main cabin and an upper cabin and pilot house. Also reported to be owned by Joseph Boughton in the early 1890s. Operational in September 1900. Underwent substantial overhaul in January 1906 at the Johnson Boat Works. By 1901, Schley had become the property of A.A. Darknell, of St. Maries and made a daily round trip between Coeur d’Alene city and St. Maries.
- Seattle. Operated by Lake City Navigation Company in September 1909. Burned at Rose Lake.
- Shoshone, sternwheeler. Built in 1908, at Coeur d'Alene city for the Carscallen Brothers. U.S. registry number 209110. Measurements were 53.6 feet long, measured over the hull (not including fantail), 9.9 foot beam, 3.0 depth of hold, 11 gross tons, 7 registered tons. Shoshone was originally powered with engines from Stanley Steamer automobiles, which were replaced with more powerful machinery when the boat was reconstructed and lengthened ten feet by the Carscellen Brothers. Reported operational as of 1909, still owned by the Carscallen Bros. of Coeur d’Alene. Steam engines generating 60 horsepower built by Gillett & Eaton, of Lake City, Minnesota were installed in this vessel in 1908. With the new engines, Shoshone was powerful enough to reach further upriver on the St. Joe than any other steamboat. Sometimes carried as many as 100 passengers. Transferred to Columbia River in 1912.
- Spokane (1881). A small steamer, Spokane had been built in 1882 by A.H. Butler. Spokane had been transferred a number of times between operating areas, and had been used on the Flathead, Pend Oreille and Kootenai lakes before being brought to Lake Coeur d'Alene in 1887 to earn money from a mining boom in the area. Spokane was lost when it struck a snag in the Coeur d’Alene River on April 5, 1887. Five or six people were drowned, including one prominent mining man on whose body $16,000 was found. Spokane was raised, and renamed Irene.
- Spokane (1901), propeller. Lower cabin, upper cabin, pilot house on roof of upper cabin. Second vessel of this name to operate on Lake Coeur d’Alene. Spokane was built in 1901 by Sorenson and Johnson for Capt. J. D. McDonald (then recently arrived at Coeur d’Alene) to be primarily a high-speed excursion boat. Spokane was 100 feet long with a beam of 16 feet, and was similar in design to the steamer Colfax. Spokane had two staterooms and a smoking room on the lower deck. On the upper deck there were women's and gentlemen's lounges, heated by steam. In 1903, Spokane, under ownership of Reynolds & McDonald, competed with the newly built Idaho, but was soon acquired by Idaho's owners, the Coeur d’Alene & St. Joe Transportation Company, later known as the Red Collar Line. Operated by Red Collar Line in March 1908. Spokane was deliberately burned as part of the 1914 celebration of Independence Day.
- Spray. Part of the Perry steamboat concern in 1909.
- St. Joe, sternwheeler, 100 feet long, 20 foot beam. Built in 1893 by Sorenson for the St. Joe Transportation Company and placed on St. Joe river run, also referred to as St. Joseph. Engines from Amelia Wheaton. Also reported to be owned by Joseph Boughton in the early 1890s. Launched on July 4, 1893 as the great event of the day. Also reported to be owned by Joseph Boughton in the early 1890s. Owned by Coeur d’Alene Navigation Co. in 1895, running in conjunction with Belleville. Rebuilt in 1896 refitted with more powerful engines, and renamed Elk. (See entry for Elk for further history.)
- St. Joe, steam tug, built in 1900 by P.W. Johnson, for the St. Joe Boom Company. This tug was 80 feet long with a beam of 16 feet and was built especially for towing and was reported to have "great pulling power." Deliberately sunk in 1943 after being unused for a long time.
- Saint Maries, tug, 85 feet long, built by Johnson Boat Works. Deliberately sunk at Three Mile Point.
- Tacoma, propeller, Eighty-five feet long, built in 1908 by Capt. J. Herbert Lyon. Capable of carrying 150 passengers. Made initial trip on July 30, 1908 from Coeur d’Alene to Harrison. Made daily runs on the lake from Coeur d’Alene City in April 1909 in conjunction with Lyondale. Later renamed Nairn, burned at the docks at Coeur d’Alene city.
- Telephone, a small freight steamer, built in 1905 for the White Star Navigation Co. Reported to have been acquired by the People's Transportation Company (II) in early September 1907. Owned by White Star Navigation Company in March 1908. Telephone had struck a snag, on May 14, 1904, in the St. Joe River at a place called the Big Four Mill, sinking in five minutes until only the pilot house and smokestack were out of the water. The boat was under water for several days before it could be raised.
- Torpedo, steam launch, active in the early 1890s. Built by Sorenson in 1892. (There was an earlier steamer named Torpedo, also built and used by Sorenson, was moved to Lake Pend Oreille in 1891.) Reported to be scheduled to carry an excursion on Saturday, May 21, 1892 to Mica Bay. Also reported (inconsistent as to date with other sources) to have been sold for service on Lake Pend Oreille, and later taken below Albeni Falls, for service on the Pend Oreille River. Torpedo was later renamed Alert.
- Totem, steam launch, used for excursions in the summer of 1906.
- United States. Made daily trips from Coeur d’Alene City to Rose Lake in late August 1907.
- Victor, steam launch, built by Johnson Boatworks, launched May 18, 1901.
- Victorine. Built by J. Herbert Lyon.
- Volunteer, propeller. built in 1888 by Sorenson for W.W. Roberts, chief engineer at Fort Sherman, and used in the construction of the O.R.&N branch line. Volunteer came to be owned by St. Joe Transportation Company by 1890. Operated by People's Transportation Co. in November 1892. Sunk in shallow water by storm in early February 1893 while moored overnight at Coeur d’Alene city. In 1895, Volunteer was sold to the Coeur d'Alene & Harrison Navigation Company, which had the boat rebuilt at Johnson & Sorenson's, after which it was renamed Belleville.
- Wallace. Built by Johnson Boat Works for A. Backlund (or Bicklund) and Frank Pipgras, launched in the spring of 1906. By early January 1907, Backlund and Pipgras were reported to have sold Wallace to the Stack-Gibbs Lumber company for a price of $7,000. In April 1907, Wallace made daily or alternate daily trips on the lake for the Red Collar line in conjunction with steamer Colfax.
- Wardner. Operated by Lake City Navigation Company in September 1909.
- Zora, steam launch in operation July 4, 1899. Operated in the 1901 summer season by James Clark. Offered for sale in July 1903, by Henry Krotzer, along with the steamer Dewey, "at low prices".

== Gallery ==
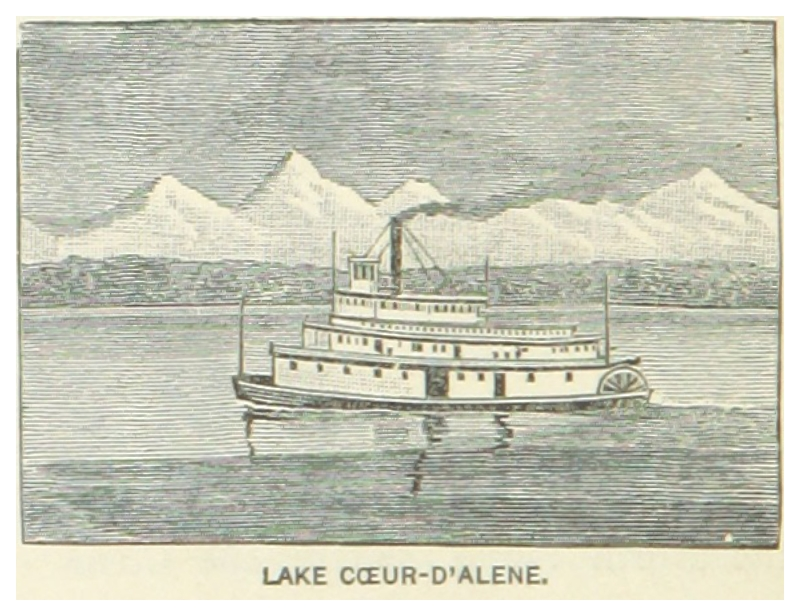
Postcard ca.1891

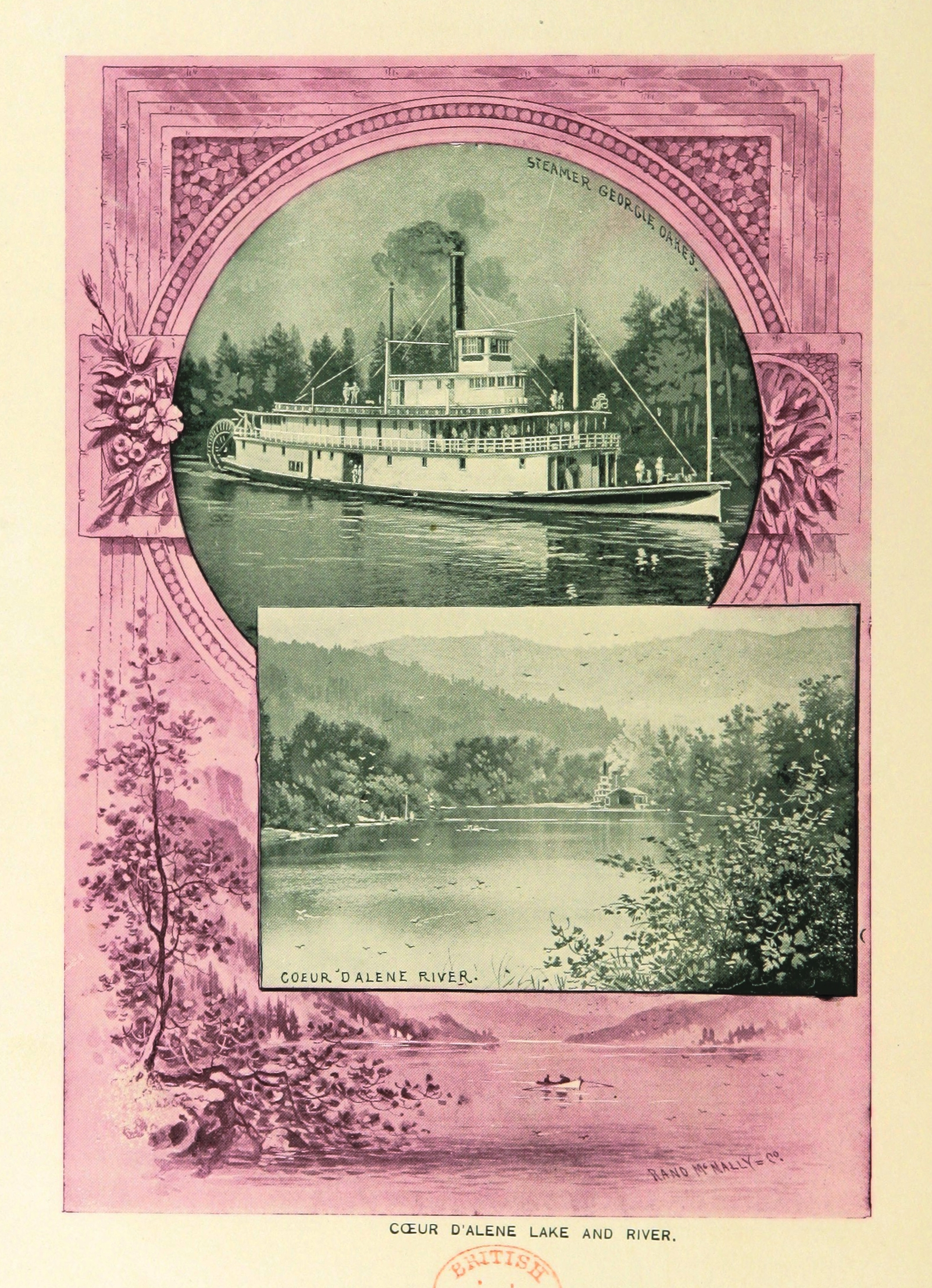
Postcard ca. 1893

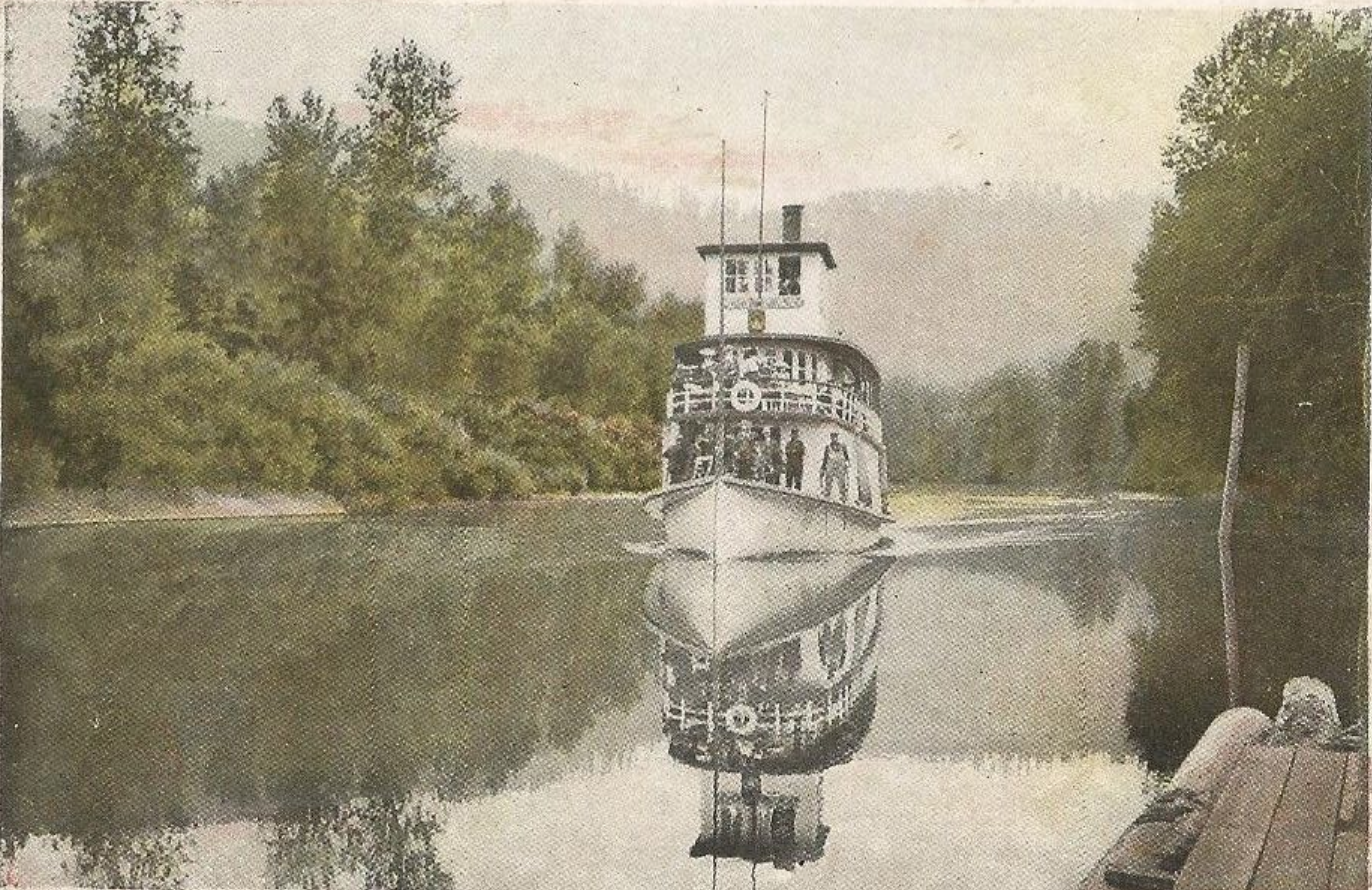
Postcard ca. 1909

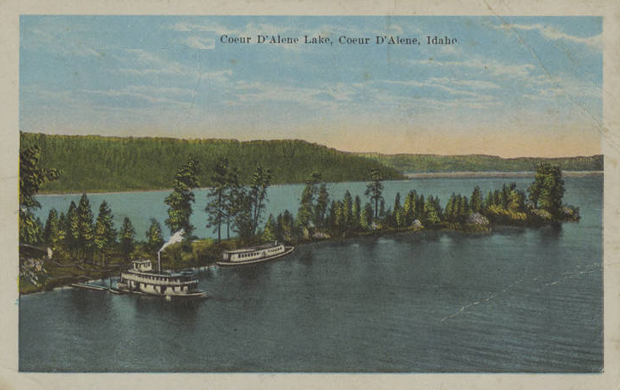
Postcard ca. 1920

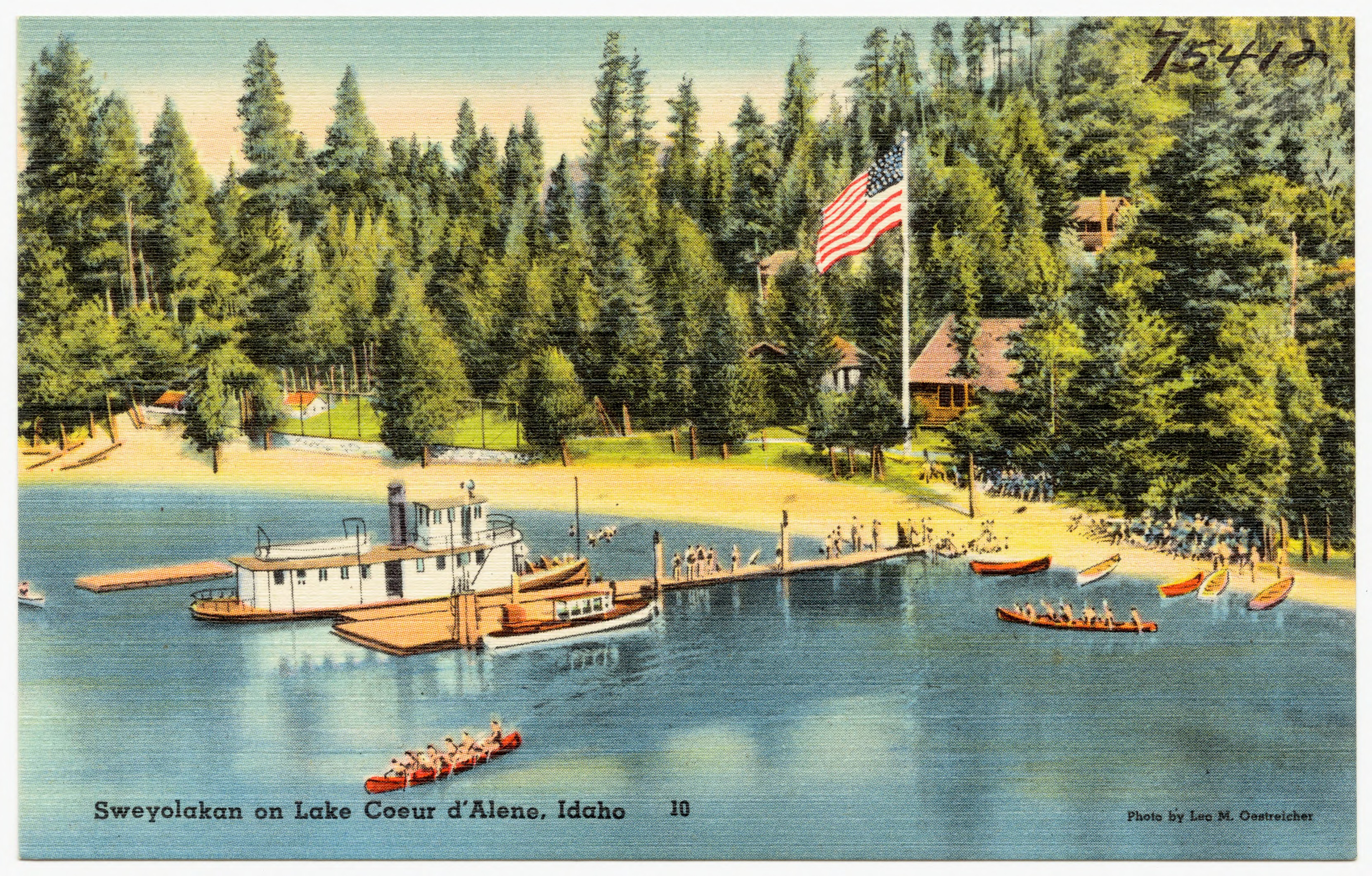
Postcard ca. 1930-1945

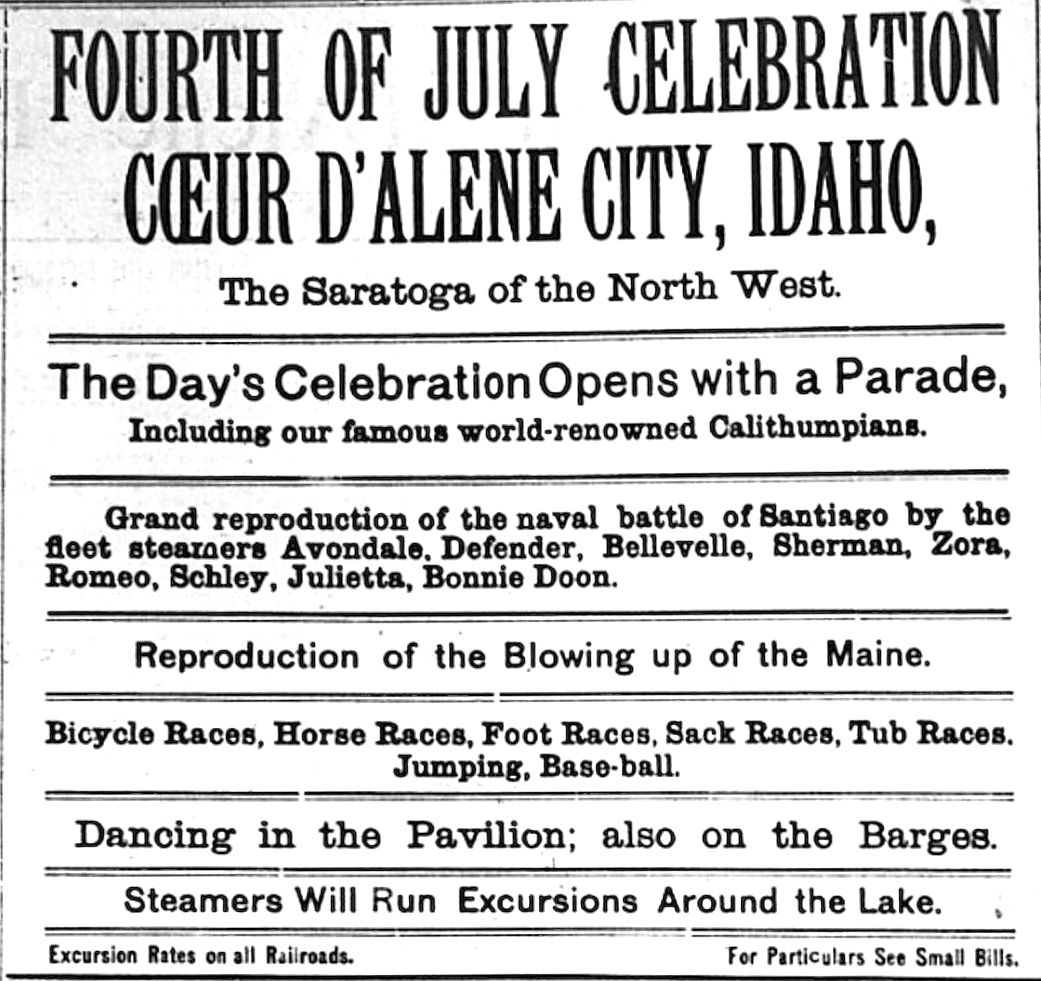
Ad for 1899 Fourth of July celebration featuring steamboats

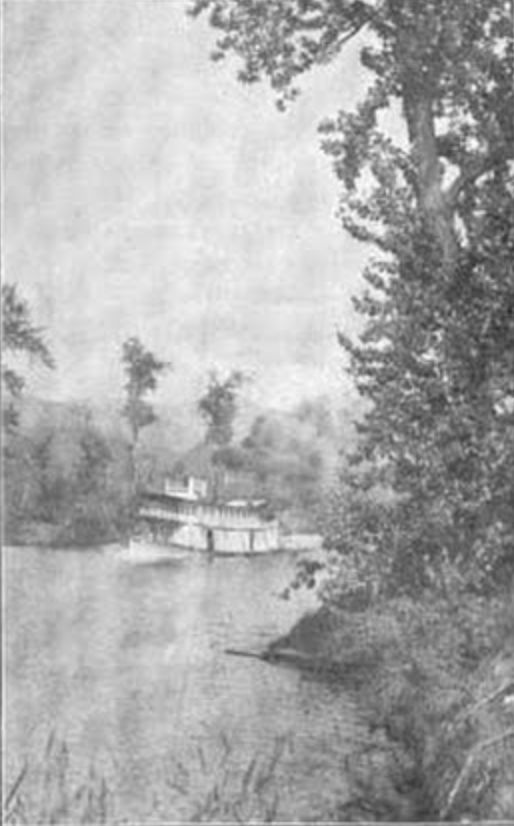
The Spokane on the St. Joe River ca. 1908

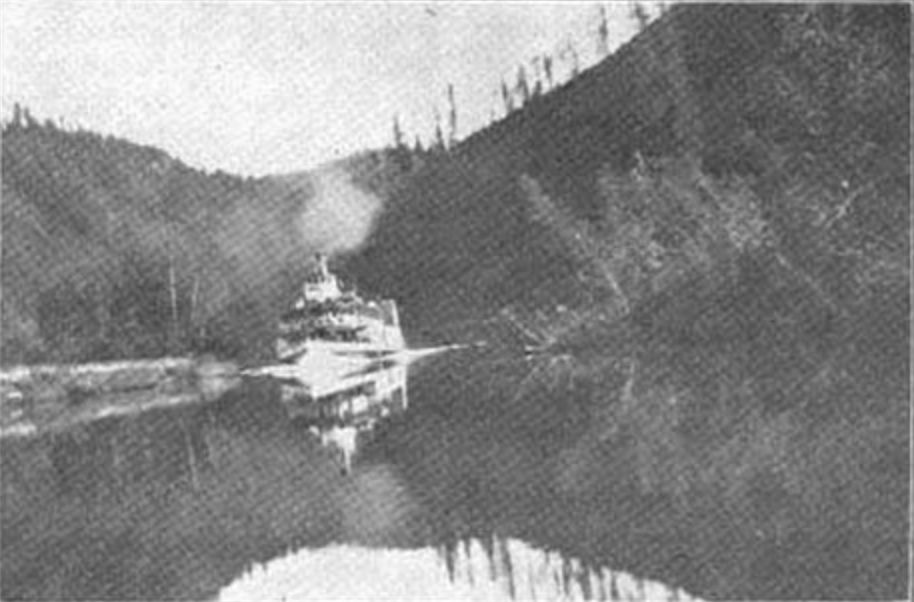
The Idaho on the St. Joe River ca. 1908

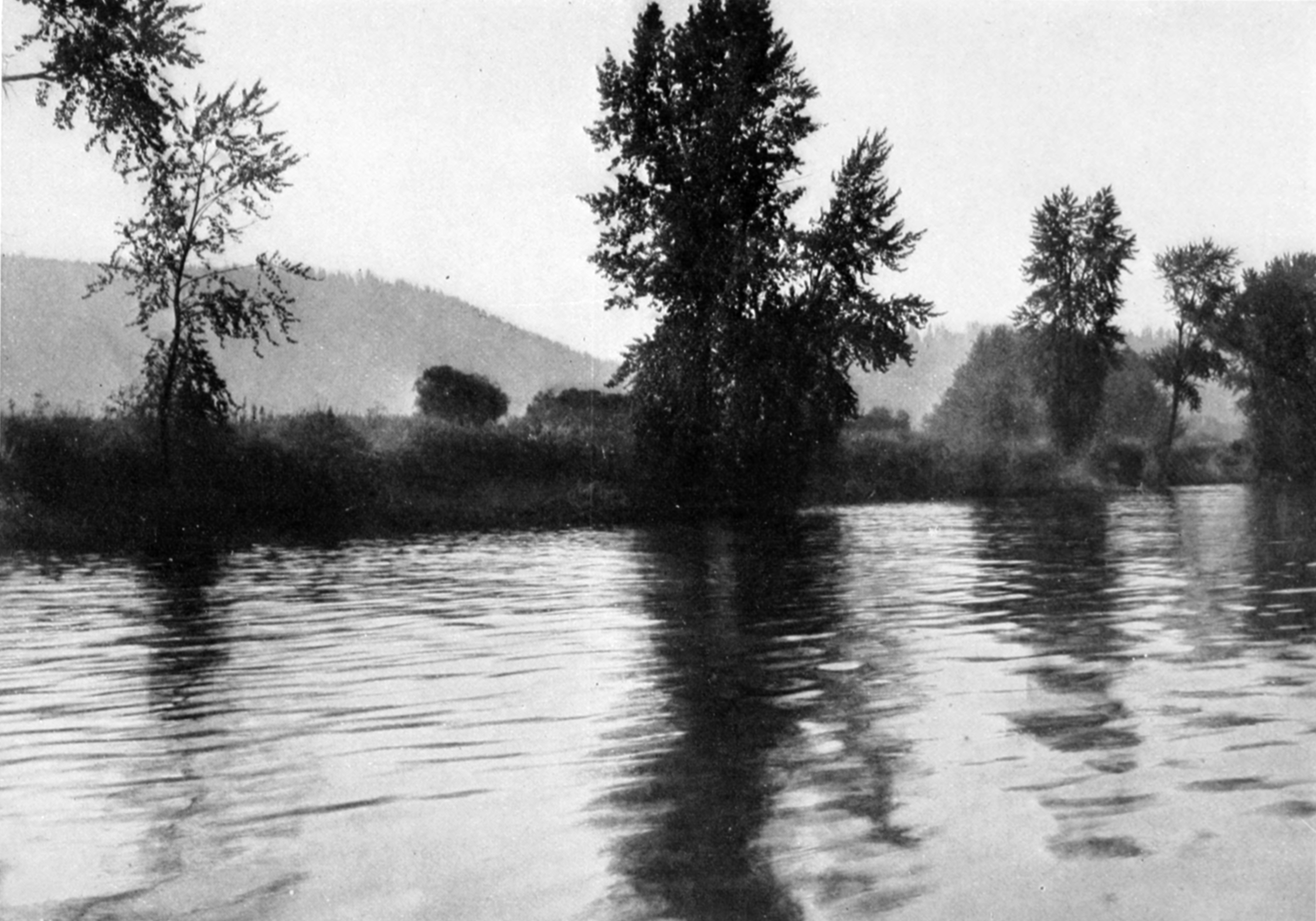
The "Shadowy St. Joe River" in 1909

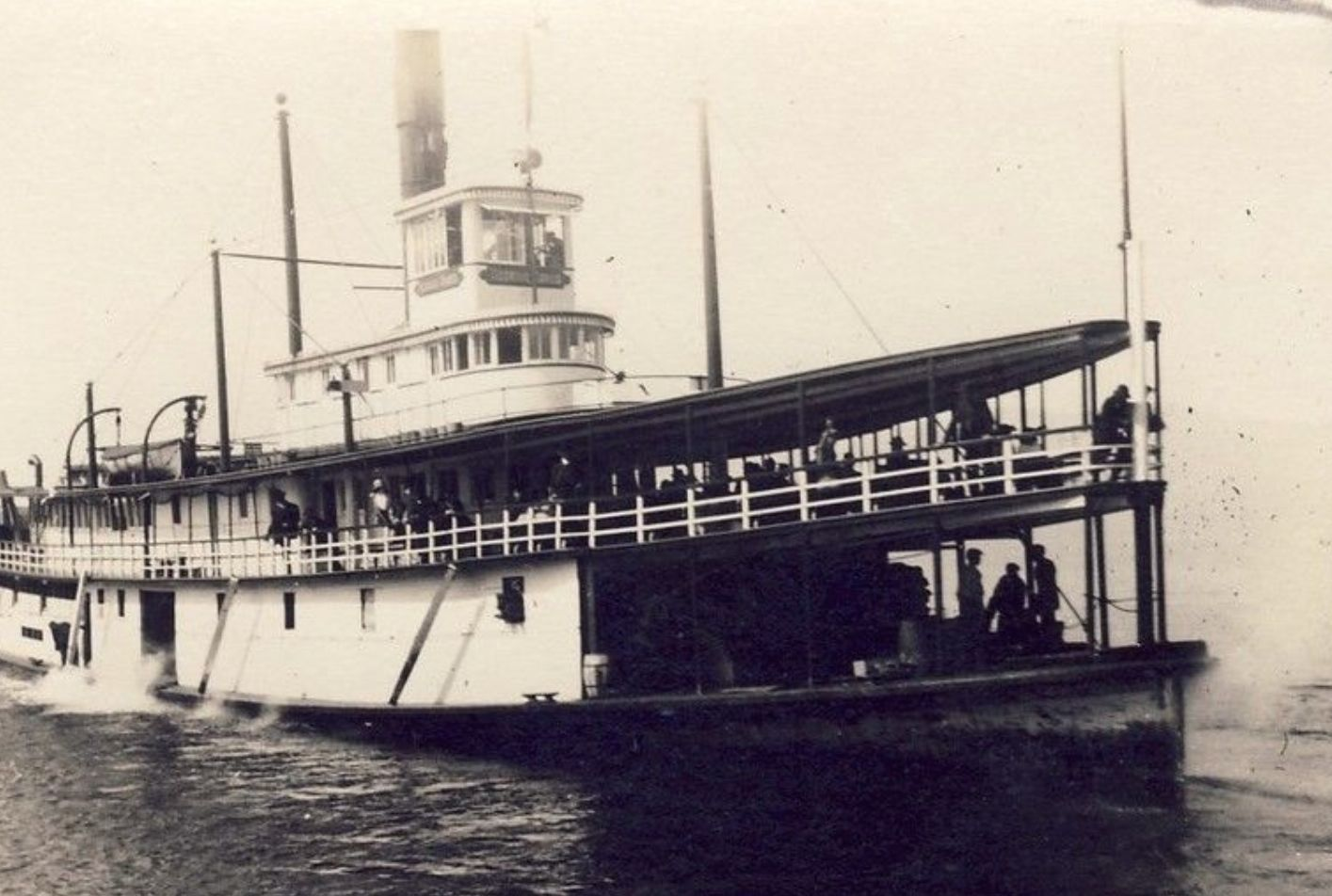
The Georgie Oakes on Lake Coeur d'Alene ca. 1910

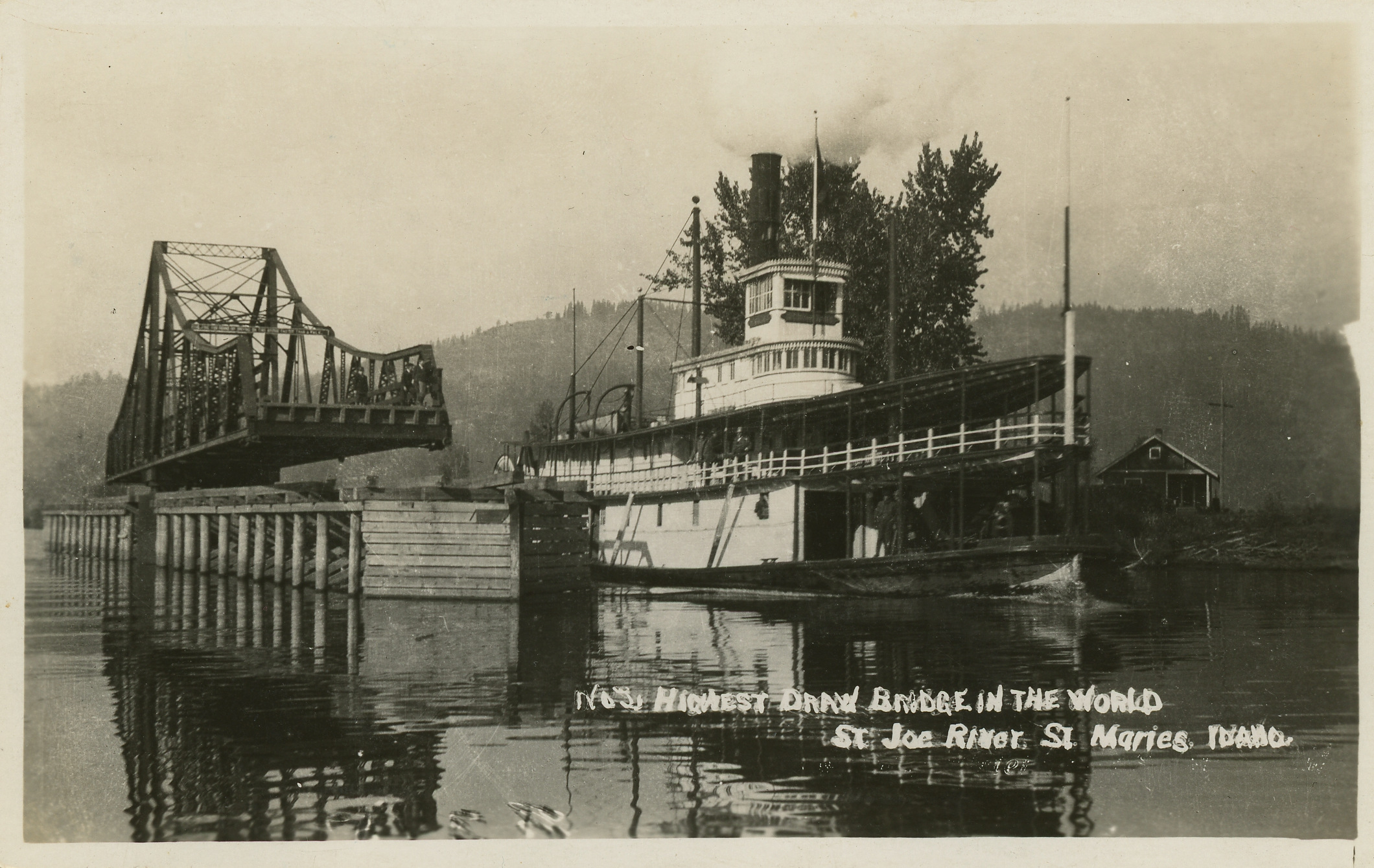
The Georgie Oakes at St. Maries ca. 1920
