= Prichard Creek =

Stream in Shoshone County, Idaho, U.S.

Coordinates: 47°39′31″N 115°58′18″W

Prichard Creek is a stream in Shoshone County, in the U.S. state of Idaho. It is a tributary of the Coeur d'Alene River.

== History ==
Prichard Creek bears the name of Andrew J. Prichard, a gold prospector.
