= Silver Valley (Idaho) =

Region in the northwest US, noted for mining

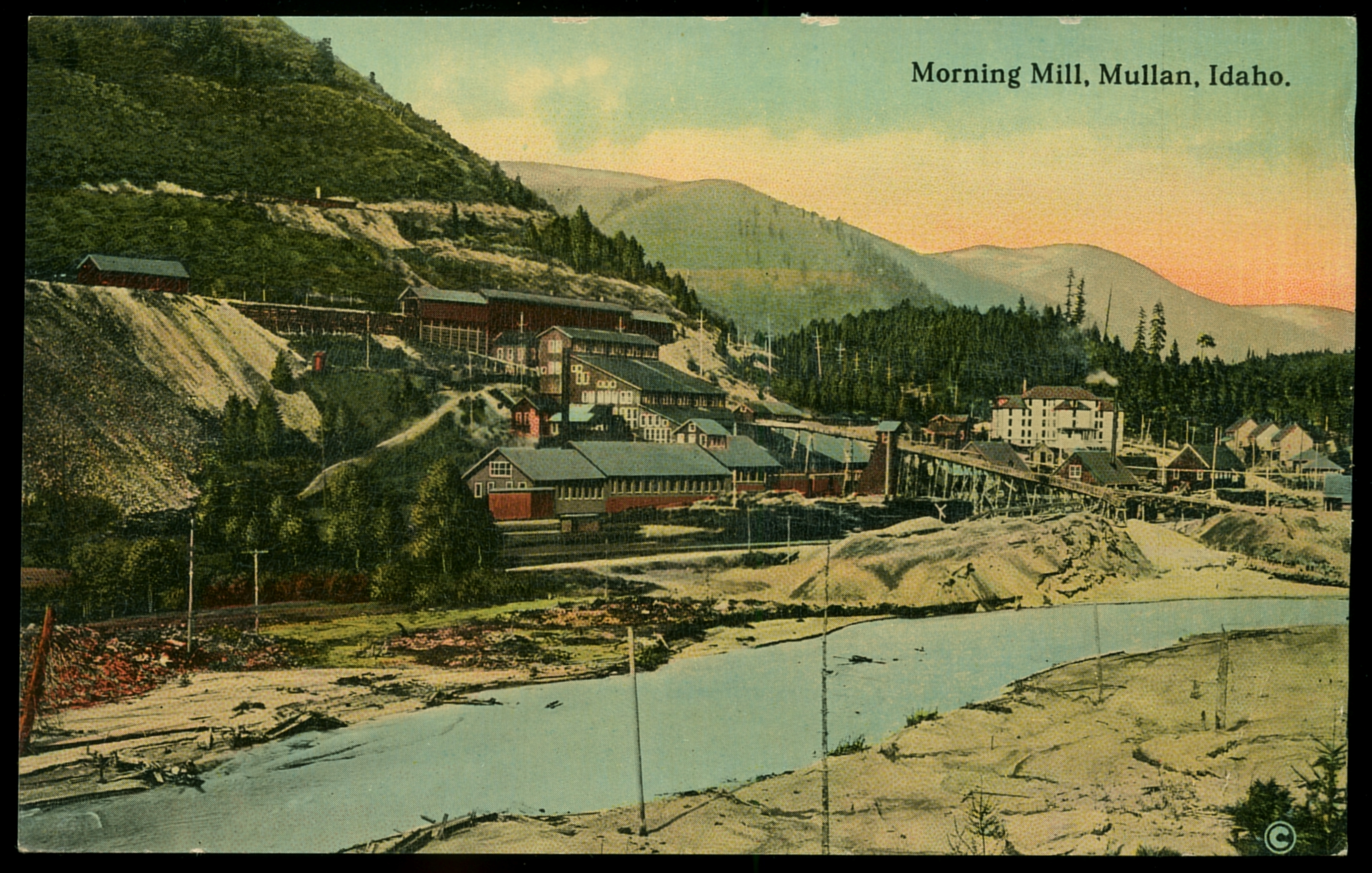
- Upper Silver Valley at Mullan in 1909
- Length: 40 mi (64 km)

Geography
- Country: United States
- State: Idaho
- Counties: Shoshone County, Idaho; Kootenai County, Idaho
- Population centers: Wallace, Idaho; Kellogg, Idaho
- Borders on: Bitterroot Mountains; Coeur d'Alene Mountains
- Coordinates: 47.527°N 116.052°W
- Interactive map of Silver Valley

Location in the United States
Location in Idaho

The Silver Valley is a region in the northwest United States, in the Coeur d'Alene Mountains in northern Idaho. It is noted for its mining heritage, dating back to the 1880s.

== Geography ==
Silver Valley is a narrow valley about 40 miles (64 km) in length, east of the city of Coeur d'Alene. The South Fork of the Coeur d'Alene River flows through the valley and Interstate 90 traverses the valley between Fourth of July Pass to the west and Lookout Pass on the Montana border.

Several towns are located in the valley, all in Shoshone County. These include (from west to east) Pinehurst, Smelterville, Kellogg, Wardner, Osburn, Silverton, Wallace, and Mullan. The Silver Valley has also been referred to as the Coeur d'Alene Valley and the Coeur d'Alene Mining District.

=== Geology ===
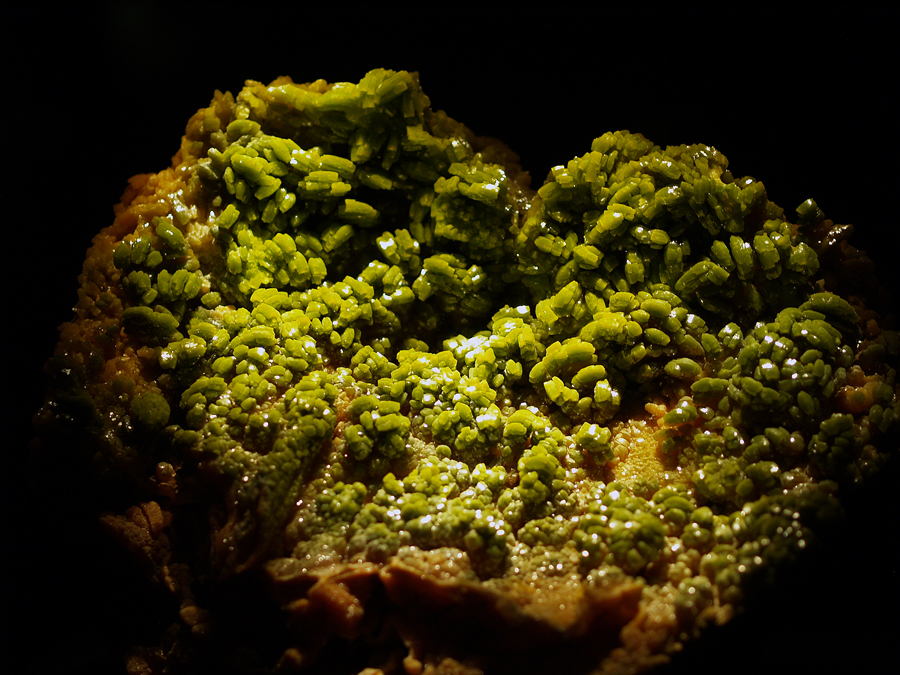
Pyromorphite specimen from the Bunker Hill Mine

The Coeur d'Alene (Silver Valley) Mining District is located in Proterozoic metasediments. The mined portion of the stratigraphic column in the Silver Valley, known as the Belt series, can be divided into six main formations, three of which have upper and lower parts. These are, from oldest to youngest: the Prichard Formation (lower and upper), Burke Formation, Revett Formation, St. Regis Formation (lower and upper), Wallace Formation (lower and upper), and Striped Peak Formation. Of these, all but the Striped Peak are ore-bearing. All six of these formations are primarily composed of quartzite and argillite. Some limestone and dolomite also occur in the Wallace and Prichard, and a smaller amount of carbonate occurs in the St. Regis. Ripple marks and mud cracks occur throughout the series. Together, these imply a shallow marine depositional environment.

The mining district occurs along the intersection of two major regional structural features. A large anticline extends through the district, running in a north-northwesterly direction. The Lewis and Clark line – a series of strike-slip faults running across the Pacific Northwest – crosses this anticline, generally trending in an east-west direction. Within this mining district, the major structure of the lineament is the Osburn fault, which runs directly through the district’s most successful silver belts. Its 16-mile (27 km) displacement divides the district into two distinct parts, the southern Page Galena Belt, and the northern Golconda Lucky Friday Belt.

Three main minerals make up most of the ore production in the Silver Valley. Galena (PbS or lead(II) sulfide) is the most important ore mineral found in the Coeur d’Alene District veins. Galena is present in veins throughout the district. Sphalerite ((Zn,Fe)S) is the second most important ore mineral, present in at least small amounts in most veins. The sphalerite is an important source of zinc throughout the ore belts. The third most abundant ore mineral is tetrahedrite (Cu,Fe)_{12}Sb_{4}S_{13}. However, the tetrahedrite is responsible for the majority of the silver produced by the Silver Valley, as it is the tetrahedrite interspersed in the galena of the district that makes it so argentiferous.

== History ==
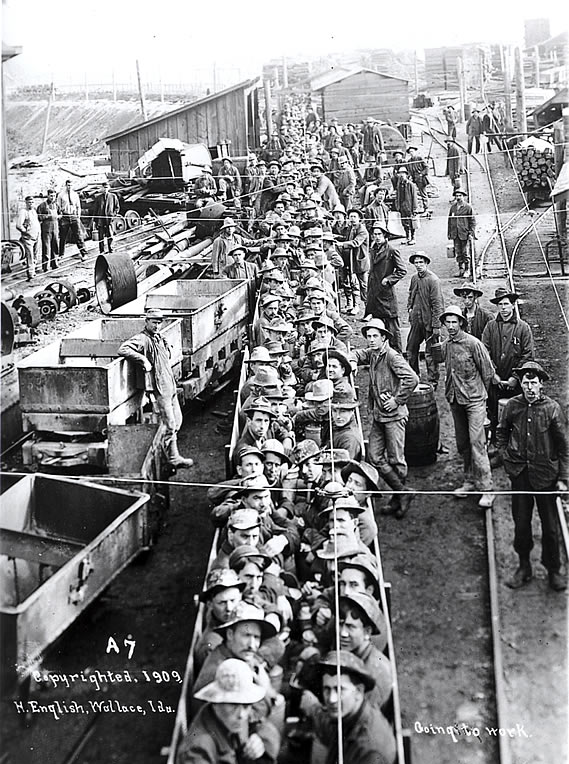
Miners going to work in 1909, Silver Valley

A party of twelve miners led by Elias Davidson Pierce found gold in Orofino Creek, a tributary of the Clearwater River, in 1860. The ensuing gold rush continued through 1875 before slowing. Among the prospectors who came north seeking gold in the Coeur d'Alene Mountains was Andrew J. Prichard, who found gold in the alluvial sands of a creek near present-day Murray, Idaho in 1883. Later in the year, prospectors entered present day Burke Canyon seeking placer gold along Canyon Creek.

Miners and prospectors came to the region after gold and silver deposits were found in the Coeur d'Alene Mountains and the Northern Pacific Railroad came to the region in 1883. In the 1890s, two significant miners' uprisings took place in the Coeur d'Alene Mining District, where the workers struggled with high risk and low pay. In 1892, the union's discovery of a labor spy in their midst, in the person of Charlie Siringo, a sometime cowboy and Pinkerton agent, resulted in a labor strike that developed into a shooting war between miners and the company in Burke Canyon. When the mine owners planned to reduce wages of some workers to offset increased operating costs, the miners declared a strike against the reduction of wages and the increase in work hours and demanded a "living wage" be paid to every man working underground – the common laborer as well as the skilled in a stand for industrial unionism. To restore order to the state of rebellion in Shoshone County, Governor N. B. Willey declared martial law and sent federal troops to arrest and detain the union miners, but not before dozens of casualties including six deaths and the destruction of the Frisco Mill. A similar labor confrontation in 1899 took place after the union was launching an organizing drive of the few mines not yet fully unionized, where miners working in the Bunker Hill and Sullivan mines were receiving fifty cents to a dollar less per day than other miners. With no success in the effort, on April 29, 250 union members seized a train in Burke at gunpoint, according to the engineer, Levi "Al" Hutton. At each stop through Burke Canyon, more miners climbed aboard what was dubbed the "Dynamite Express" toward the site of the $250,000 Bunker Hill mine near Wardner; the miners then carried 3,000 pounds (1,400 kg) of dynamite into the mill and completely destroyed it. The crowd also burned down the company office, the boarding house, and the home of the mine manager. Like in the 1892 strike, martial law was declared by Governor Frank Steunenberg and wholesale arrests and mass incarcerations were done to bring back order.

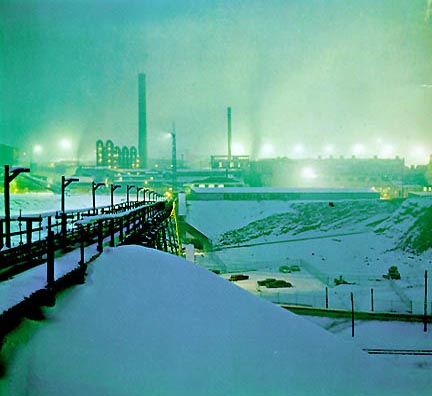
Bunker Hill smelter in operation during the 1970s

By 1903, Burke Canyon was the most developed mining region in the Coeur d'Alene Mountains and was home to seven dividend-paying mines: the Gem of the Mountains, Frisco, Mammoth, Standard, Hecla, Tiger-Poorman and Hercules mines. Other mines soon began production throughout the Coeur d'Alene mining district, including the Bunker Hill Mine (1886), Star-Morning Mine (1887), Sunshine Mine (1890), Galena Mine (1922) and Lucky Friday Mine (1942).

A devastating wildfire swept through the area in August 1910 as lightning- and human-caused fires, fanned by strong winds and dry conditions, consumed three million acres and damaged or destroyed Wallace, Kellogg, Osburn, Burke and Murray. During the fire, Ed Pulaski, a U.S. Forest Service ranger led a crew of forty-five men into an abandoned prospect mine near Wallace, saving thirty-nine lives.

After WWII the district included 34 concentrating mills and 24 mines. The largest operations included Bunker Hill, Sunshine, Day, Federal and Hecla.

Although miners were originally lured to the general area by the promise of gold, the primary metals mined in the valley were silver, zinc, and lead. The total quantities produced are impressive: over a billion ounces of silver, 3 million tons of zinc, and 8 million tons of lead totalling over $6 billion in value, ranking the valley among the top ten mining districts in world history. During the 1970s, nearly half of the nation's silver production came from the Silver Valley. After nearly a century of vigorous mining and smelting activity, operations were severely curtailed in the early 1980s, resulting in massive unemployment and a significant loss of population. In addition to the economic difficulties, the valley has been saddled with significant environmental challenges.

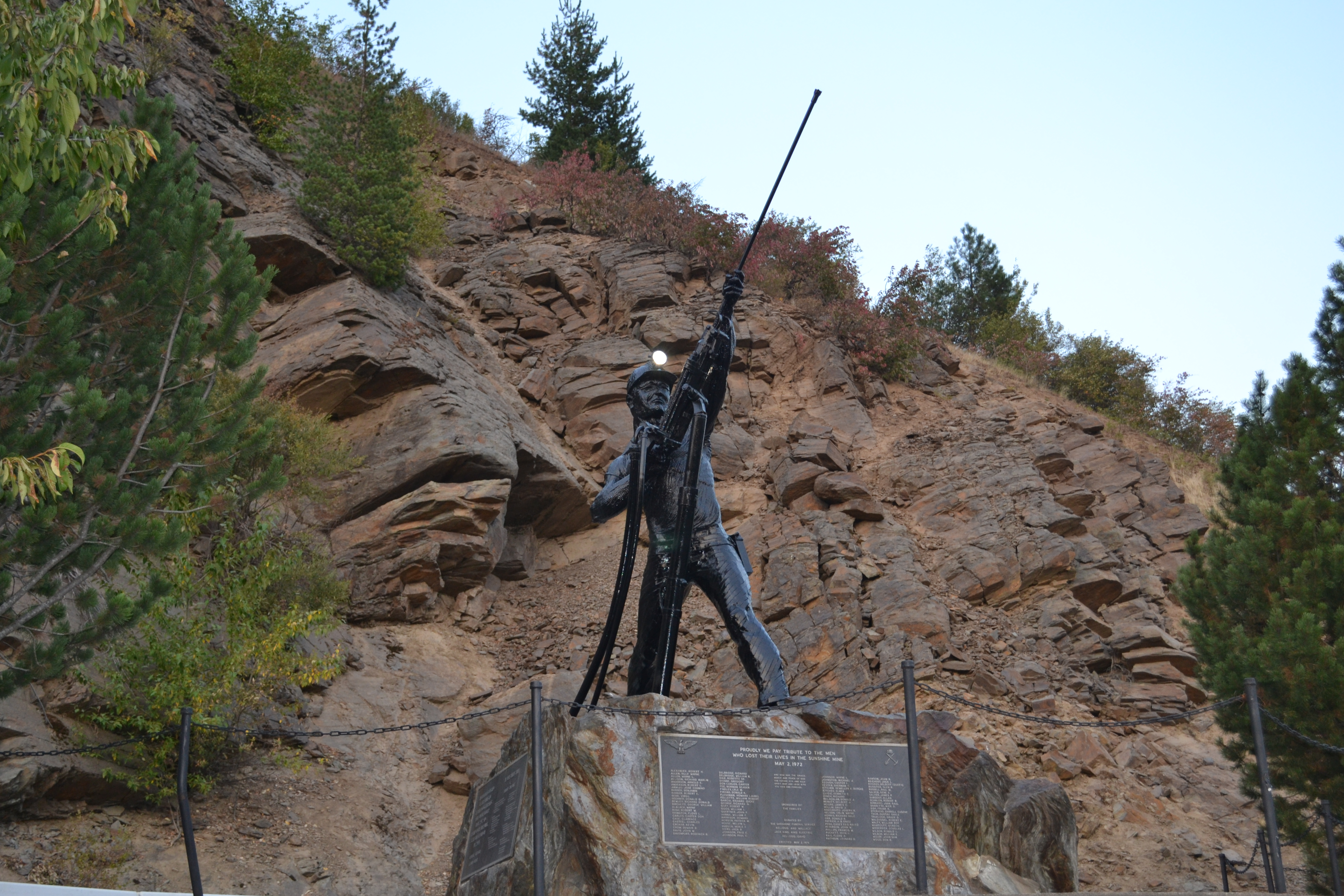
Sunshine Miners Memorial

A disaster at the Sunshine Mine on the day shift on the morning of May 2, 1972 resulted in the carbon monoxide poisoning deaths of 91 men. The mine was closed for seven months after the fire, one of the worst mining disasters in American history, and the worst disaster in Idaho history.

While some mining operations remain, the Silver Valley has focused its future upon recreational tourism and light manufacturing. The nearest major population center is the city of Spokane, Washington, which is 70 miles (110 km) west along I-90. The growing recreational city of Coeur d'Alene is halfway in between. The extensive restoration efforts can be seen in the return of the tundra swans. Restoration means returning an area to its healthy natural habitat.

The Idaho Geological Survey lists several active and inactive mines in the Silver Valley:

- Active
  - Lucky Friday mine
  - Galena Complex, consisting of:
    - Coeur Mine
    - Galena Mine
- Inactive, but with resources in the ground:
  - Bunker Hill Mine and Smelting Complex
  - Sunshine Mine

== Outdoor recreation ==
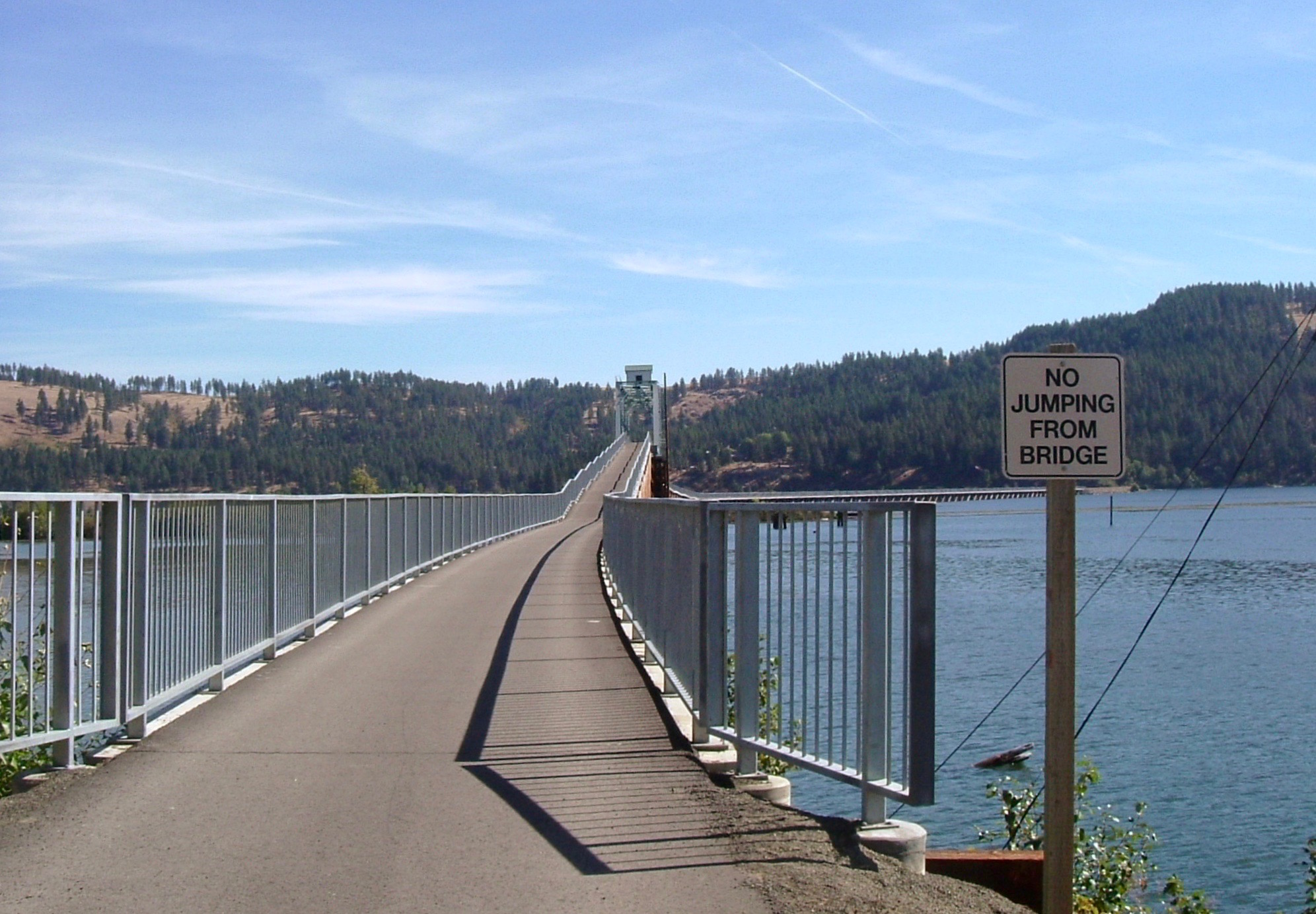
Chatcolet Bridge in 2003

There are two alpine ski areas in the Silver Valley, both easily accessible from I-90. Lookout Pass is at the east end of the valley on the Montana border adjacent to the freeway. Silver Mountain is thirty miles west, accessed from the Kellogg city limits by the world's longest single-stage passenger gondola, a quarter mile (400 m) from the highway.

Bicycling is a recreational activity for both locals and tourists in the Silver Valley, with trails and paths ranging from easy to extreme. In addition to the challenging lift-served mountain-bike trails at Silver Mountain, there are two new major bike paths in the vicinity that use old railroad grades.

Lookout Pass ski area is also a primary staging area for the unique Route of The Hiawatha rail-trail, which begins in Montana and runs downhill through tunnels and over trestles to the North Fork of the St. Joe River, 15 miles (24 km) away. The trail is named for the Olympian Hiawatha passenger trains of the Milwaukee Road railroad, on whose abandoned tracks, trestles, and tunnels the gravel trail rests. One of the tunnels (Taft) is over 1.6 miles (2.6 km) in length. When completed, the Route of The Hiawatha will stretch from St. Regis, Montana to the very remote Pearson, Idaho, several miles north of Avery, (equidistantly south of Mullan).

The other trail is the Trail of the Coeur d'Alenes, completed in 2004. The paved bike path runs more than 72 miles (115 km), starting from Mullan in the east. It follows the South Fork of the Coeur d'Alene River down through the Silver Valley to the south end of Lake Coeur d'Alene, passing over a historic bridge, then up to Plummer in northwest Benewah County. The bike trail uses old right-of-way from the Union Pacific railroad.

== Maps ==
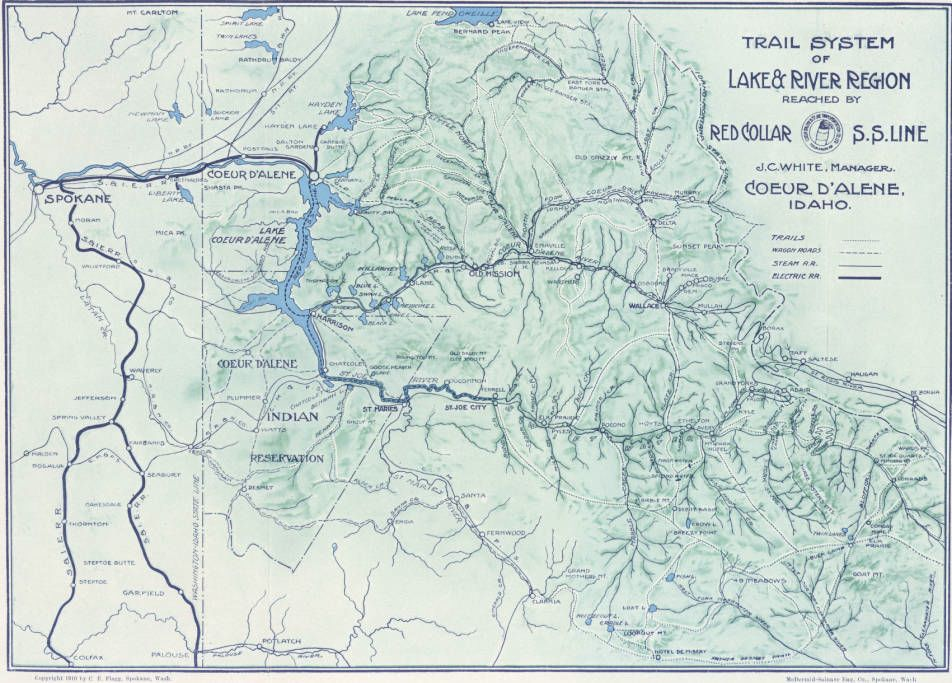
1910 regional transportation map centered on the Silver Valley

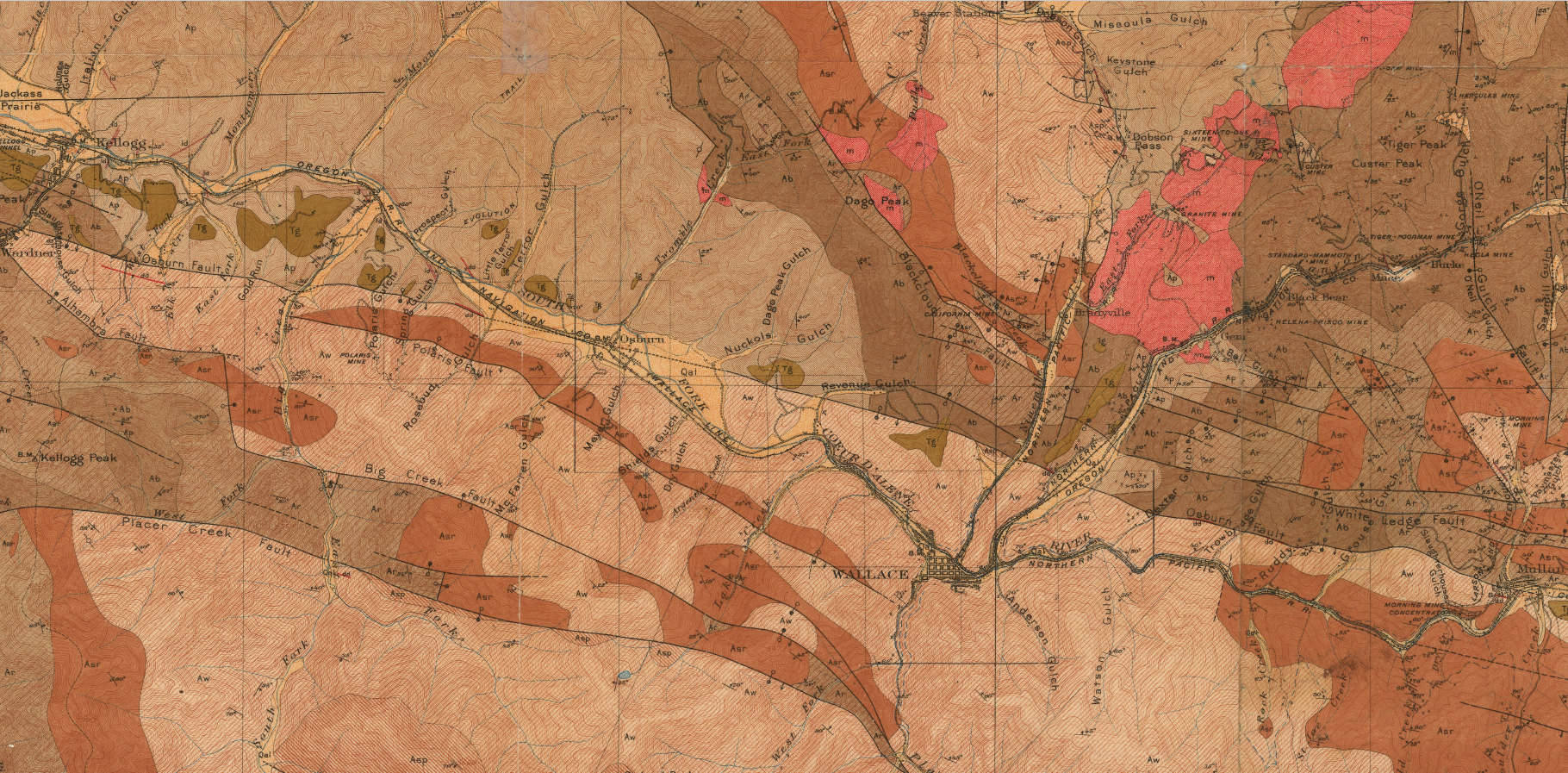
1907 geological map of the Silver Valley in Idaho, and the location of the Osburn Fault. Also included are the locations of the towns of Kellogg, Osburn, Wallace and Mullan (west to east).

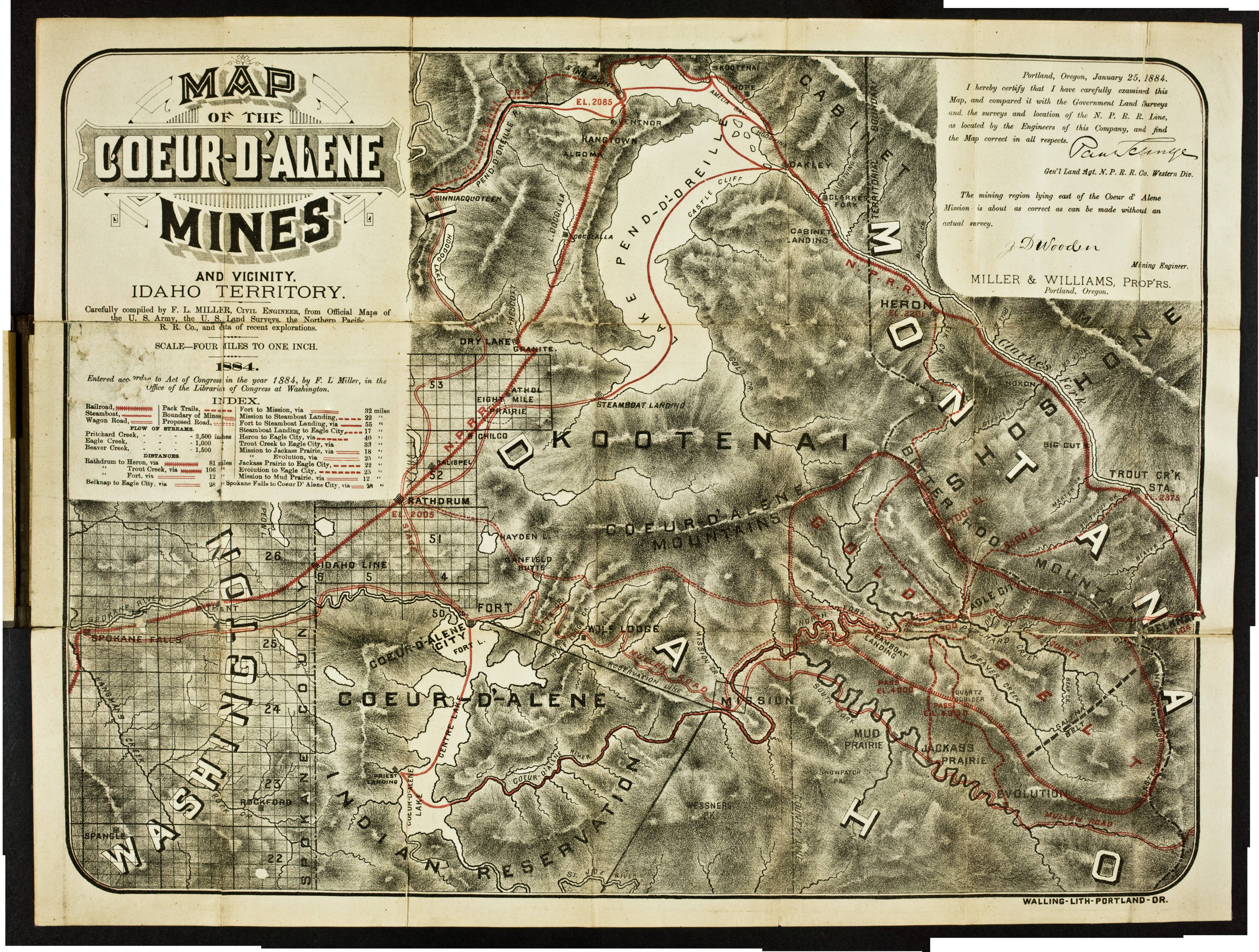
Guide to the Coeur d'Alene Mining District, 1884

== See also ==
- Bunker Hill Mining Company
- Hecla Mining
- Sunshine Mine (Idaho)
- Lucky Friday mine
- Spokane Valley
