= Hecla Mining =

American mining company

Hecla Mining Company
- Type: Public
- Traded as: NYSE: HL; S&P 400 component
- Industry: Mining
- Founded: October 14, 1891; 135 years ago in Burke, Idaho, U.S.
- Founders: Amasa Campbell; Patsy Clark; John Finch
- Headquarters: Coeur d'Alene, Idaho, U.S.
- Products: Silver; Gold
- Website: hecla.com

Hecla Mining Company is a gold, silver, and other precious metals mining company based in Coeur d'Alene, Idaho. Founded in 1891, it is the largest silver mining company in the United States and the 9th biggest mining company in the United States overall. This area is known as the Silver Valley (Idaho). In 1983, this entire area was designated as a Superfund site by the Environmental Protection Agency, because of land, water, and air contamination resulting from a century of mostly unregulated silver and gold mining.

== History ==
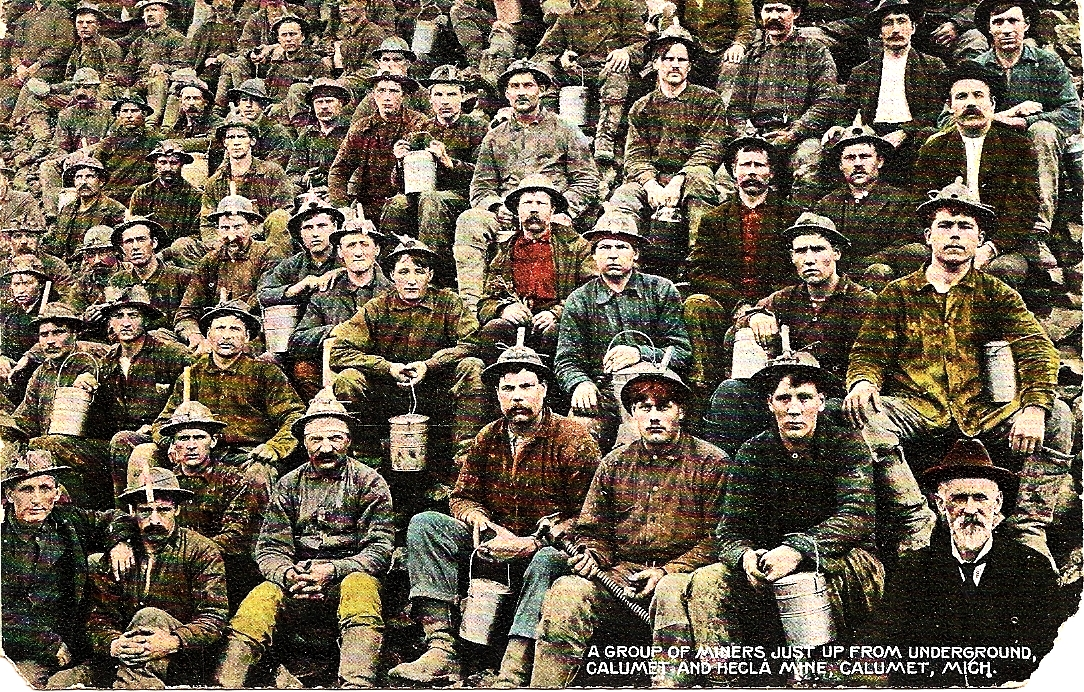
Group of Miners, Just up from Underground

James Toner filed the Hecla claim on 5 May 1885. He passed on the claim to A.P. Horton, who sold it to George W. Hardesty and Simon Healey. Patrick (Patsy) Clark owned the claim outright by 1 July 1891. On 29 Sept. 1891, Clark formed the Hecla Mining Company with Albert Gross and Charles Kipp. On 14 Oct. 1891, the company was incorporated in Idaho by Clark, Charles Kipp, John A. Finch, Amasa B. (Mace) Campbell, John Dorsey, Healey and Hardesty, and 500,000 shares issued. By 1897, the mine had three tunnels and a 150 foot winze. On 12 July 1899, the new Hecla Mining Company was incorporated in Washington by Campbell, Finch and Clark. The company was capitalized with 1,000,000 shares, surrounding claims were acquired, and Edward F. Moffitt made manager. The Hecla tunnel was rebuilt in 1900, and the company paid its first dividend on 25 July 1900. Ore was sent to Salida, Colorado for processing by American Metal Company's Ohio & Colorado Smelting & Refining Company. James F. McCarthy took over management in 1903, James R. Smith was elected president, and the company bought the Milwaukee mill located in Gem. In 1913, Hecla started sending ore to International Smelting and Refining Company in Tooele, Utah. Hecla Mining moved offices from Spokane, Washington, to Wallace, Idaho, on 14 Oct. 1904.

In Oct. 1908, Frank Upman was elected president, he was succeeded by McCarthy in Oct. 1911, and the east ore body was discovered in Feb. 1912. On 23 Sept. 1915, Hecla stock was listed on the New York Curb Exchange, and monthly dividends paid since March 1904, became quarterly in 1918. In July 1917, Hecla began sending its ore to the Bunker Hill Mine and Smelting Complex in Kellogg, Idaho, and by 1918, the Hecla mine shaft was reaching 2000 feet in depth. In 1920, Hecla acquired Federal Mining & Smelting Co.'s claims near Hecla, including the Tiger-Poorman.

The Bunker Hill Mining Company constructed an electrolytic zinc plant after purchasing the Star Mine in Burke. Bunker Hill formed an equal partnership with Hecla Mining to develop the Star Ore and develop the zinc plant, calling the company the Sullivan Mining Company. The Star ore was accessed and mined from an almost 8000 foot tunnel from the lower workings of Hecla Mine. The tunnel was started in 1921, and the zinc plant was operational by Oct. 1928, and used Dr. U.C. Tainton's process. The Tainton process used sulfuric acid to combine with the zinc, forming a sulfate solution, followed by electrolysis to remove the zinc. The product was called Bunker Hill 99.9 percent zinc.

The 13 July 1923 fire burned most of Burke's business district, including Hecla's surface plant, putting the mine out of business for almost 6 months. Use and Occupancy Insurance covered the loss, and Hecla rebuilt the plant with concrete and steel. In 1924, ore was found in the Star, and a substantial ore body was discovered in the Hecla at the 2800 foot level. A tunnel then connected the Star with the Morning mine at the 2250 foot level. In 1925, a tailings mill started operation next to the Gem mill, and continued operation until 1949. The main Hecla shaft was deepened to the 3500 foot level by 1929.

In 1930, Hecla gained control of the Polaris Mine. In 1933, Hecla started developing the Polaris mine with a shaft, while buying the surrounding property, which included the Chester in 1936, and Silver Summit in 1935. The Silver Summit tunnel was then extended to the Polaris shaft. The Polaris Development & Mining Company included 10 percent ownership by Newmont Mining Corporation in 1934, and Newmont's exploration geologist, Fred Searls, joined the Hecla board.

Lewis E. Hanley served as president starting in 1940, until 1951. Hecla started a tailings mill at Osburn, that processed 4,000,000 tons of Canyon Creek tailings over the next 5 years. The last tonnage of ore hoisted from the Hecla Mine was on 31 July 1944, bringing the total to 9,050,977 tons. The Hecla Mine stayed open at the 2000 foot level, so the Star could operate. The Silver Summit shaft was deepened to 3000 feet, where additional ore was discovered in 1946. By 1948, Hecla owned 50% of Sullivan, 63% of Polaris (now merged with Silver Summit), and 33% of the Resurrection Mining Co., located east of Leadville, Colorado.

Lester Randall became president in 1951, and served until 1966, when William H. Love took over. Randall worked on consolidating Hecla's balance sheet, selling its interest in Sullivan to Bunker Hill in exchange for stock, becoming the largest shareholder at 17.37% in 1955. Hecla was paid a fee and rental for Star access, until 1961, when it took a 30% interest in production. Hecla also sold off the Pend Oreille Lead Zinc Co. stock it had bought in 1945, while relinquishing Rock Creek claims, located southeast of Wallace, it acquired in 1946.

In 1958, Hecla started purchasing shares in Lucky Friday Silver-Lead Mines, eventually becoming the major owner at 38%. In 1964, Lucky Friday Silver-Lead Mines Co. merged into Hecla Mining. This allowed Hecla to trade on the New York Curb Exchange. On 21 Dec. 1964, shares of Hecla Mining started trading on the New York Stock Exchange, after 49 years on the American Stock Exchange.

In 1966, Hecla acquired the Morning Mine from Asarco. The Morning Mine had been operating since 1889, when it was closed in 1953. Hecla had reached an agreement in 1961 to develop the Morning through the Star. Hecla established the Hecla corridor connecting Burke with Mullan, and developed a central shaft to deepen the mine to the 9100 foot level. In 1967, Hecla purchased 14% of Day Mines, Inc., becoming the largest stockholder, and reached an agreement to develop the Hunter Ranch through the Lucky Friday shaft. In 1967, Hecla agreed to develop the Lakeshore copper mine in Arizona, which was unsuccessful due to the low copper prices. Hecla suffered a considerable loss; the copper mine was closed eventually.

William A. Griffith took over as president in 1979, and Hecla decided to sink a third shaft, "the Silver Shaft", at Lucky Friday, taking it to 6205 feet by 1983. On 8 July 1981, Hecla and Day Mines agreed to merge. Hecla thus acquired the Knob Hill gold mine near Republic, Washington, besides owning all of the Lucky Friday. In 1982, Hecla shut down operations at the Star-Morning. On 7 June 1983, Hecla incorporated in Delaware. On 9 March 1984, Hecla merged with Ranchers Exploration and Development Corp., and Hecla acquired the Escalante silver mine west of Cedar City, Utah, the Kentucky-Tennessee Clay Co., and the Colorado Aggregate Co. In 1986, Hecla opened its new corporate office north of Coeur d'Alene and Arthur Brown became president.

In June 2011 Hecla Mining settled an environmental suit under the Superfund statute, filed under CERCLA in 1991 by the Coeur d'Alene Tribe, which was later entered by the United States and the state of Idaho. Under the settlement agreement, Hecla Mining will pay $263.4 million plus interest to the plaintiffs

"to resolve claims stemming from releases of wastes from its mining operations. Settlement funds will be dedicated to restoration and remediation of natural resources in the Coeur d’Alene Basin. The agreement, which was lodged in federal district court in Idaho today, brings closure to that lawsuit and establishes a strong basis for future cooperation between Hecla and the governments in the Coeur d’Alene Basin."

In January 2017 Hecla Mining reported full year 2016 production totaling 17.2 million ounces of silver and 233,929 ounces of gold.

Beginning in 2019, EPA inspections of the Greens Creek Mine found several violations involving the improper disposal of lead-containing items. In 2023, the company agreed to pay $143,124 and to take corrective action to settle the violations with the EPA.

== Location sites ==
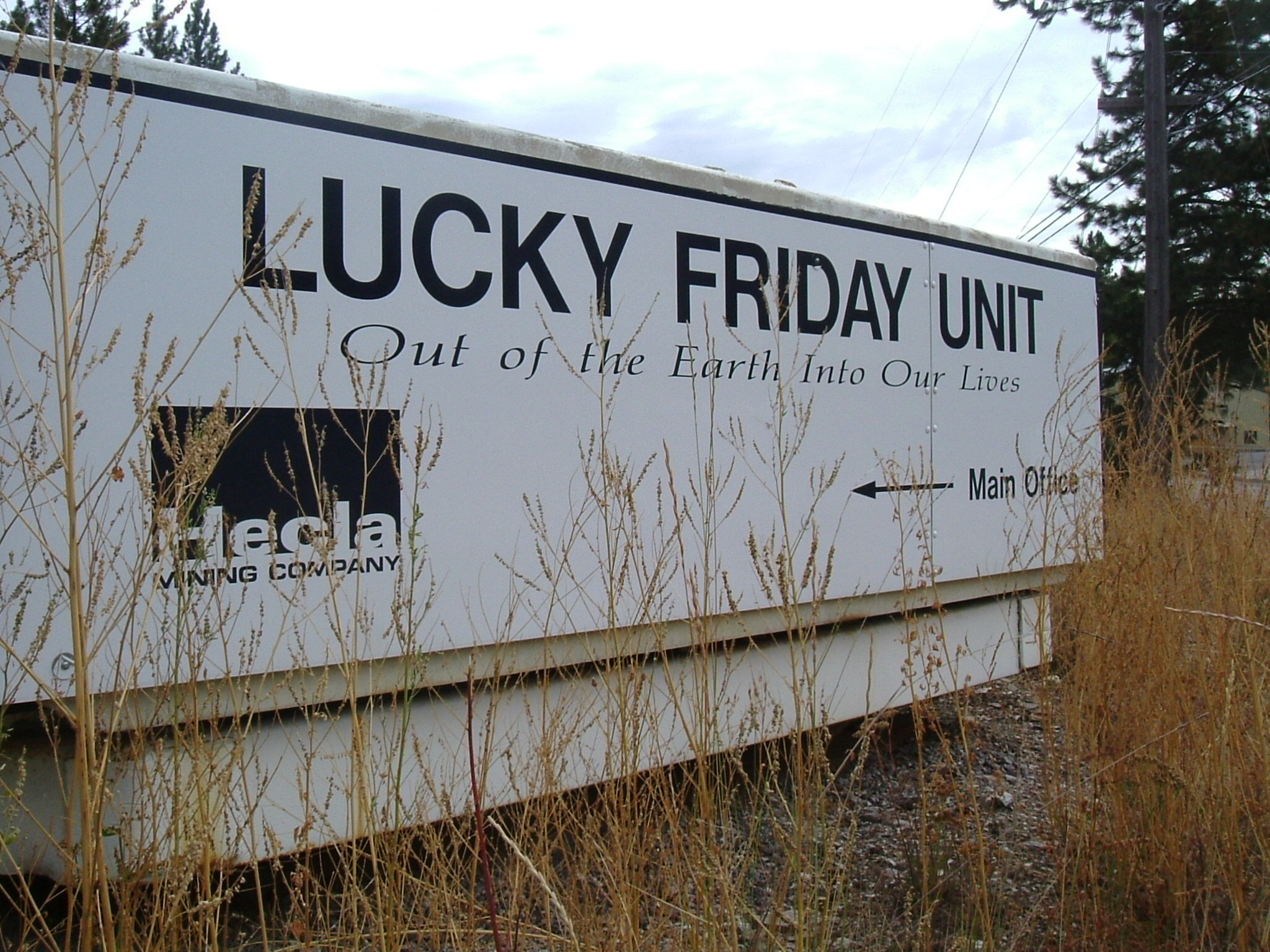
Hecla's Lucky Friday mine office

Hecla's processing takes place in various sites besides the United States. Some Hecla mining sites are Casa Berardi, in La Sarre Quebec. This site is 100% owned by Hecla, with a production rate of 121,493 ounces of gold. Another site is the Greens Creek and Lucky Friday, Lucky Friday is a deep underground site that has been operation since 1942. Due to COVID-19 in 2020 the site production decreased significantly, and was only able to produce about 2.0 million ounces of silver that year.

== See also ==
- Gold mining
  - Gold mining in Alaska
- Klondex Mines
- Ore deposits
- Silver mining in the United States
