= Lucky Friday mine =

Silver etc. mine near Mullan, Idaho, USA

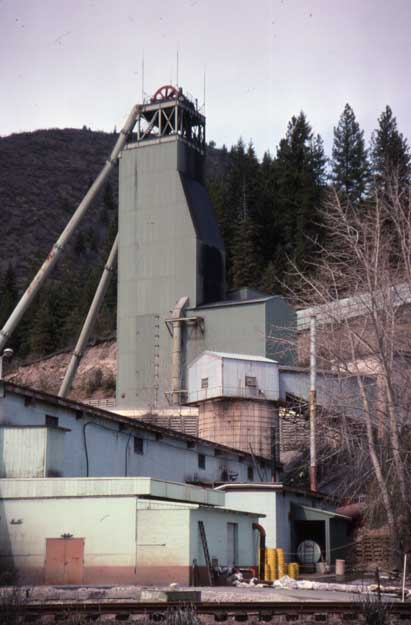
- Lucky Friday mine in 1995

- Location within Idaho
- Location: Silver Valley (Idaho),Idaho,United States; 47.471°N 115.783°W
- Products: Lead, Silver, Gold, Zinc, Copper, Antimony, Cadmium
- Type: Underground
- Discovered: 1880
- Opened: 1942
- Company: Hecla Mining
- Website: www.hecla-mining.com

The Lucky Friday mine is an underground silver, lead, and zinc mine in the western United States, near Mullan, Idaho. Operated by Hecla Mining company, it is one of the few mines remaining operational in the Silver Valley of northern Idaho, producing 1000 tons of ore per day. The ore deposit type is Polymetallic veins of hydrothermal origin. The mining method used is underhand cut and fill mining.

The mine's primary access and production are through the Silver Shaft, an 18-foot (5.5 m) diameter, concrete-lined shaft sunk to a depth of 6,200 feet (1,890 m), over 2,800 feet (855 m) below sea level.

== Geography ==
Located in northern Idaho, the mine is one mile (1.6 km) east of Mullan in the Coeur d’Alene Mining District, on the north side of exit 69 of Interstate 90. The elevation at the surface is approximately 3,400 feet (1,035 m) above sea level. About 5 miles (8 km) eastbound on I-90 is Lookout Pass, the border with Montana.

== Geology ==
The geology is Precambrian meta‐sedimentary rocks and forms veins ranging in width from 4 to 20 feet (1.2 to 6.1 m), and over six thousand feet (1,830 m) in depth. The ore is bleached by hydrothermal processes and extend downwards in veins at a 75-degree angle.

== History ==
The mine was discovered in 1880 by J.F. Ingalls. Production started in 1942.

Six claims were filed by the Lucky Friday Group between 1899 and 1906. The claims were located between two faults with only a hint of ore veins at the surface, and was largely ignored, except for sporadic trenching and tunneling. In 1938, John Sekulic leased, with an option to buy, the six deserted claims. On 30 March 1939, Sekulic and Charles E. Horning organized the Lucky Friday Silver-Lead Mines Company in Idaho, and issued 1,200,000 shares. Sinking a 100-foot (30 m) shaft showed more promising veins, prompting a contract with Albert H. Featherstone's Galconda Lead Mines, Inc., to sink the shaft to the 600-foot (180 m) level. The first shipment of 478 tons of ore was made in Jan. 1942. The mine reached the 1,400-foot (430 m) level in 1948. In 1951 the company paid its first dividend. Horning became president and general manager upon Sekulic's death in 1956. Between 1954 and 1958, the mine produced ores averaging 17.2 ounces (490 g) of silver and 8.6 ounces (240 g) of lead per ton. In Dec. 1958, Hecla Mining bought the shares owned by Featherstone and Horning, and continued to buy outstanding shares until Hecla became the major owner of Lucky Friday at 38%. In 1964 the Lucky Friday Silver-Lead Mines Company merged into Hecla Mining.
