= Klondex Mines =

North American gold mining company

- Type: Subsidiary
- Founded: 1975
- Headquarters: Reno, Nevada and Vancouver, British Columbia
- Key people: Paul Huet (President and Chief executive officer); Richard Hall (Chairman)
- Parent: Hecla Mining
- Website: https://www.klondexmines.com/

Klondex Mines was a North American gold-mining company, based in Reno, Nevada and Vancouver, British Columbia. It had three operating mines in Nevada and one in Manitoba, and was listed on the Toronto Stock Exchange and the NYSE American. In March 2018, it was acquired by Hecla Mining.

== History ==
Klondex Mines was founded in 1975, through the spinoff of the Fire Creek Project in Nevada from Placer Development. Until 2012, Klondex was principally engaged in exploration of its Fire Creek Project. It attempted to sell this project to several suitors in the 2000s, but was not successful in doing so.

In 2011, a dissident shareholder group successfully proposed a new board of directors. In September 2012, the current CEO, Paul Huet, took control, as the result of another proxy battle. Huet had experience with the company, as part of previous teams examining the possibility of buying its Fire Creek project. At that time, the company was in dire financial straits.

In February 2014, the company bought the Midas mine and mill in Nevada from Newmont Mining for US$83 million. Huet had experience with the mine, having previously been the mine manager for seven years. In January 2016, the company purchased the Rice Lake gold mine (also called the True North mine) in Manitoba for US$32 million, from creditors. Also in 2016, it purchased the Hollister mine in Nevada for US$80 million.

In 2018, the company laid off 90 employees at its True North mine, as the result of disappointing production in 2017. Production was only about 25,000 ounces, as opposed to the expected 50,000 ounces.

In March 2018, the company was acquired for US$462 million by Hecla Mining. At the same time, Klondex's Canadian assets (principally the True North mine) were spun out into a new entity, Klondex Canada, listed on the TSX Venture Exchange.

== Operations ==
Klondex had four operating mines, with total 2017 production of about 220,000 gold-equivalent ounces. Its four mines were

- Fire Creek mine in Lander County, Nevada
- Midas mine in Elko County, Nevada
- Hollister mine in Elko County, Nevada
- True North mine (also called Rice Lake mine) in Bissett, Manitoba
