= Norman Buck =

American lawyer and jurist

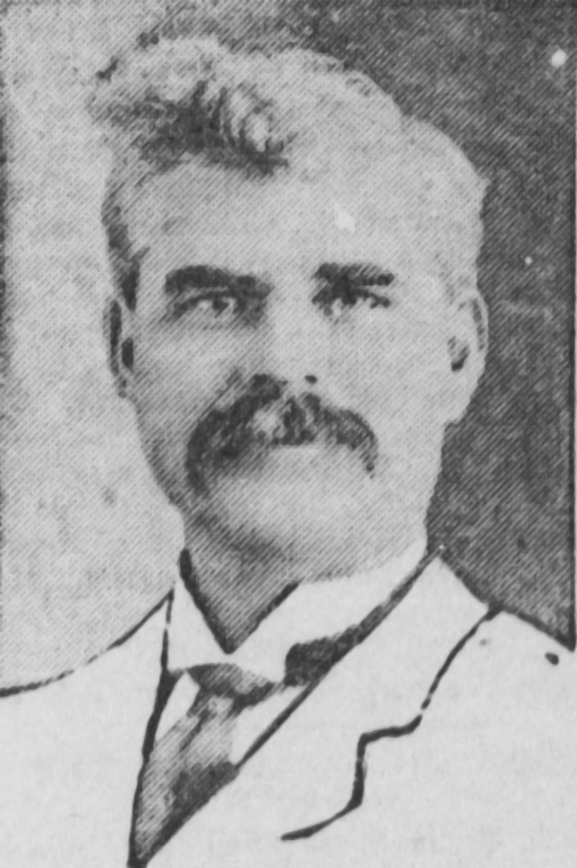

Member of the Washington House of Representatives from the 5th district
- In office January 11, 1909 – August 20, 1909 Serving with Lester P. Edge
- Preceded by: Emery P. Gilbert; D. M. Thompson
- Succeeded by: Guy B. Groff; Lloyd E. Gandy

Associate Justice of the Idaho Territorial Supreme Court
- In office January 27, 1880 – May 1888
- Appointed by: Rutherford B. Hayes; Chester A. Arthur
- Preceded by: John Clark
- Succeeded by: John Lee Logan

United States Attorney for the Territory of Idaho
- In office May 10, 1878 – January 27, 1880
- Appointed by: Rutherford B. Hayes
- Preceded by: Joseph W. Huston
- Succeeded by: James B. Butler

Personal details
- Born: April 13, 1833 Lancaster, New York, U.S.
- Died: August 20, 1909 (aged 76) Spokane, Washington, U.S.
- Party: Republican
- Spouse: Francena Medora "Dora" Kellogg (m. 1863)
- Children: 4
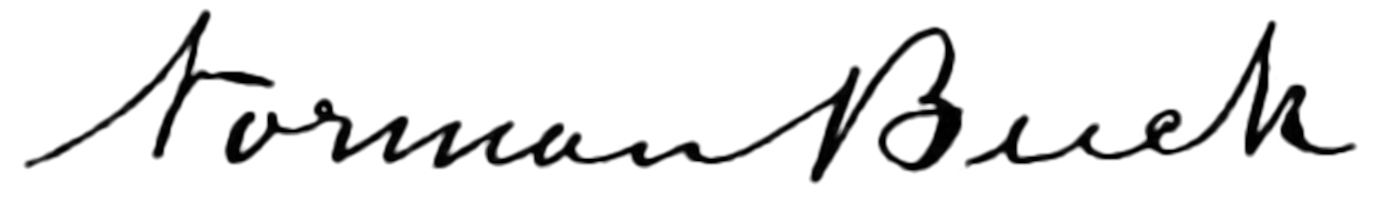
- Signature

Norman Buck (April 13, 1833 – August 20, 1909) was an American lawyer and jurist who served as Associate Justice of the Idaho Territorial Supreme Court from 1880 to 1888.

== Biography ==
Buck was born on April 13, 1833, in Lancaster, New York, and moved as a child with his family to Batavia, Illinois. He attended a seminary nearby in Warrenville before moving to Sheboygan County, Wisconsin. He attended Lawrence University beginning in 1854, graduating in 1859, and he then received an LL.B. from Albany Law School in 1860. Buck opened a law practice in Winona, Minnesota, before being mustered into the Union Army in 1862 and marrying fellow Lawrence University graduate Francena Medora "Dora" Kellogg, daughter of Wisconsin legislator Chauncey Kellogg, in 1863. They would have four sons.

Buck was elected as county attorney and probate judge of Winona County, Minnesota, before he was nominated by President Rutherford B. Hayes on April 10, 1878, to be U.S. Attorney for the Idaho Territory and he was confirmed by the senate on May 10. In this position, he prosecuted Jay Gould and a son of Brigham Young. A year later, Hayes nominated Buck on May 19, 1879, to be Associate Justice of the Idaho Territorial Supreme Court. However, the senate rejected his nomination on June 30 by a vote of 23 to 26. The rejection was largely along party lines, and came with the allegation that Buck had previously been insane. Hayes renominated Buck for the same position on December 1, 1879, and this time he was confirmed by the senate by a vote of 34 to 13 on January 27, 1880. After his four-year term expired, President Chester A. Arthur renominated Buck on March 3, 1884, and he was confirmed by the senate eight days later.

Buck was the first judge to establish a court in the mining town of Murray, and it was here that he would render his most famous decision. The lode that led to the Bunker Hill Mine was discovered when it was kicked up by a donkey that had been loaned to prospector Noah Kellogg, for whom the town of Kellogg would be named. Buck overruled the jury in the case, finding that this entitled the donkey's owners to a large share in the resulting mining claims. A settlement was reached awarding the donkey's owners $76,000, the equivalent of over $2 million as of 2023, before an appeal went to the full territorial supreme court, where much higher sums were potentially in play.

At the request of his successor, John Lee Logan, Buck retained his judgeship until May 1888. The following year, he established a law practice in Spokane, Washington. He was elected as superior judge of Spokane County, and served from 1892 to 1896. He was elected in 1908 as a Republican by Spokane County to the Washington House of Representatives. He died in that office at his home in Spokane on August 20, 1909, from apoplexy. His son, W. Storey Buck, would also serve in the Washington House of Representatives.
