= John Lee Logan =

American lawyer and jurist

Associate Justice of the Idaho Territorial Supreme Court
- In office April 12, 1888 – November 1889
- Appointed by: Grover Cleveland
- Preceded by: Norman Buck
- Succeeded by: Willis Sweet

Personal details
- Born: March 5, 1848; Salem, Virginia, U.S.
- Died: January 15, 1890 (aged 41); Lewiston, Idaho Territory, U.S.
- Political party: Democratic
- Spouse: Gertrude Powell Tucker (m. 1883)
- Children: 0
- Parents: James W. Logan (father); Sarah Strother (mother)
- Relatives: John Randolph Tucker (father-in-law)

John Lee Logan (March 5, 1848 – January 15, 1890) was an American lawyer and jurist who served as Associate Justice of the Idaho Territorial Supreme Court from 1888 to 1889.

== Biography ==
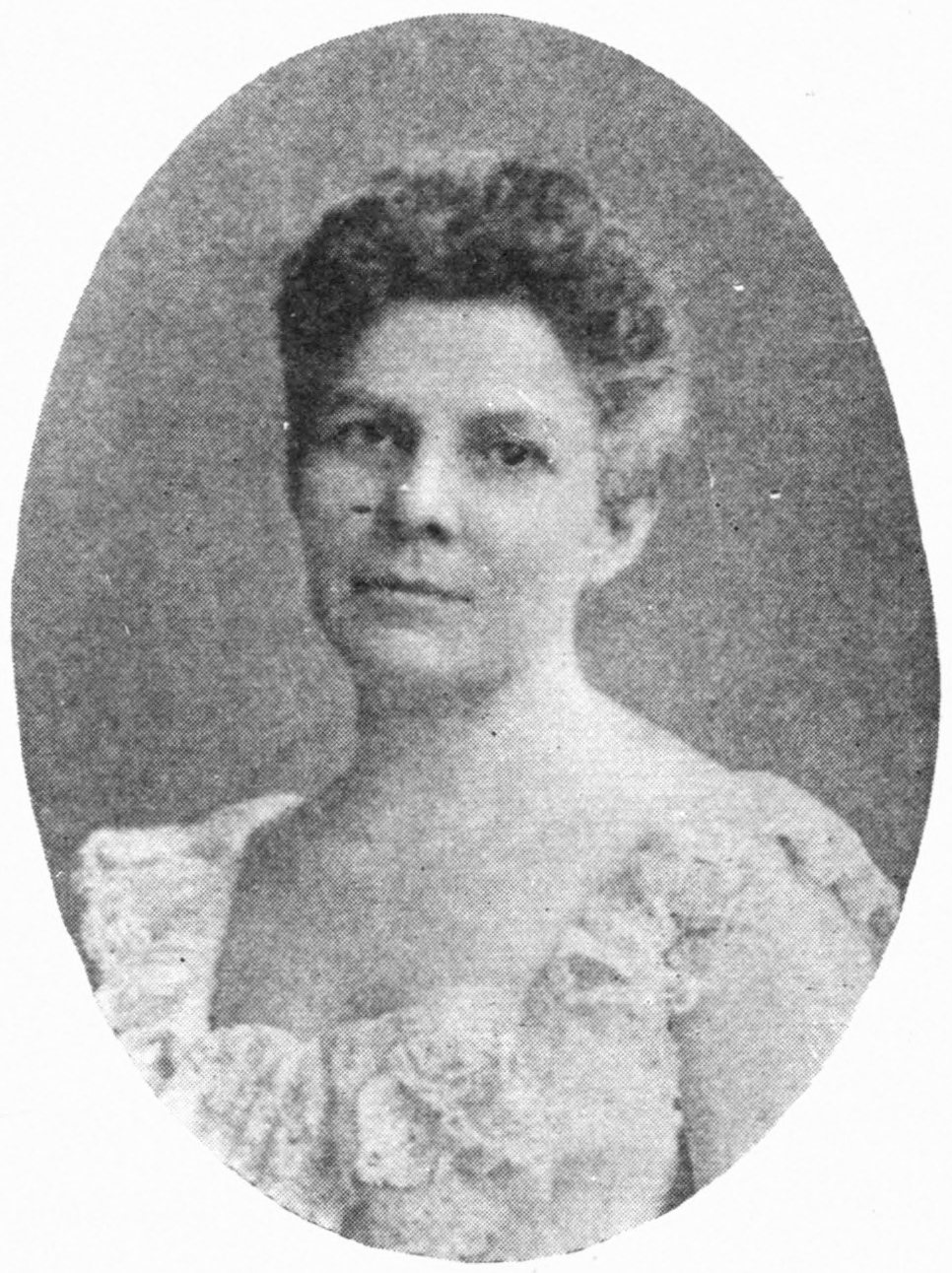
Gertrude Tucker Logan, wife of John Lee Logan and daughter of John Randolph Tucker.

Logan was born in Salem, Virginia, on March 5, 1848, the son of James W. and Sarah (née Strother) Logan, the latter a descendant of Alexander Spotswood, John Rolfe, and Pocahontas. He attended the Virginia Military Institute, but dropped out to join a cavalry regiment of the Confederate Army. He read law under his future father-in-law, John Randolph Tucker, in Richmond, Virginia, from 1868 to 1870, and was admitted to the bar in 1869. He moved to New York City, and served as a law clerk from 1870 to 1873 before opening his own practice. He married Gertrude Powell Tucker, in 1883. They would have no children. He was active in local Democratic politics in the 1870s.

On March 5, 1888, President Grover Cleveland nominated Logan as Associate Justice of the Idaho Territorial Supreme Court, and he was confirmed by the senate on April 12, 1888. He accepted the position with hope that it would improve his failing health. His health continued to deteriorate in the Idaho Territory, leading President Benjamin Harrison to remove Logan, replacing him with Willis Sweet in November 1889. Logan died soon after in Lewiston, Idaho Territory, on January 15, 1890.
