= Sunshine Mine =

Silver mine in Silver Valley, Idaho

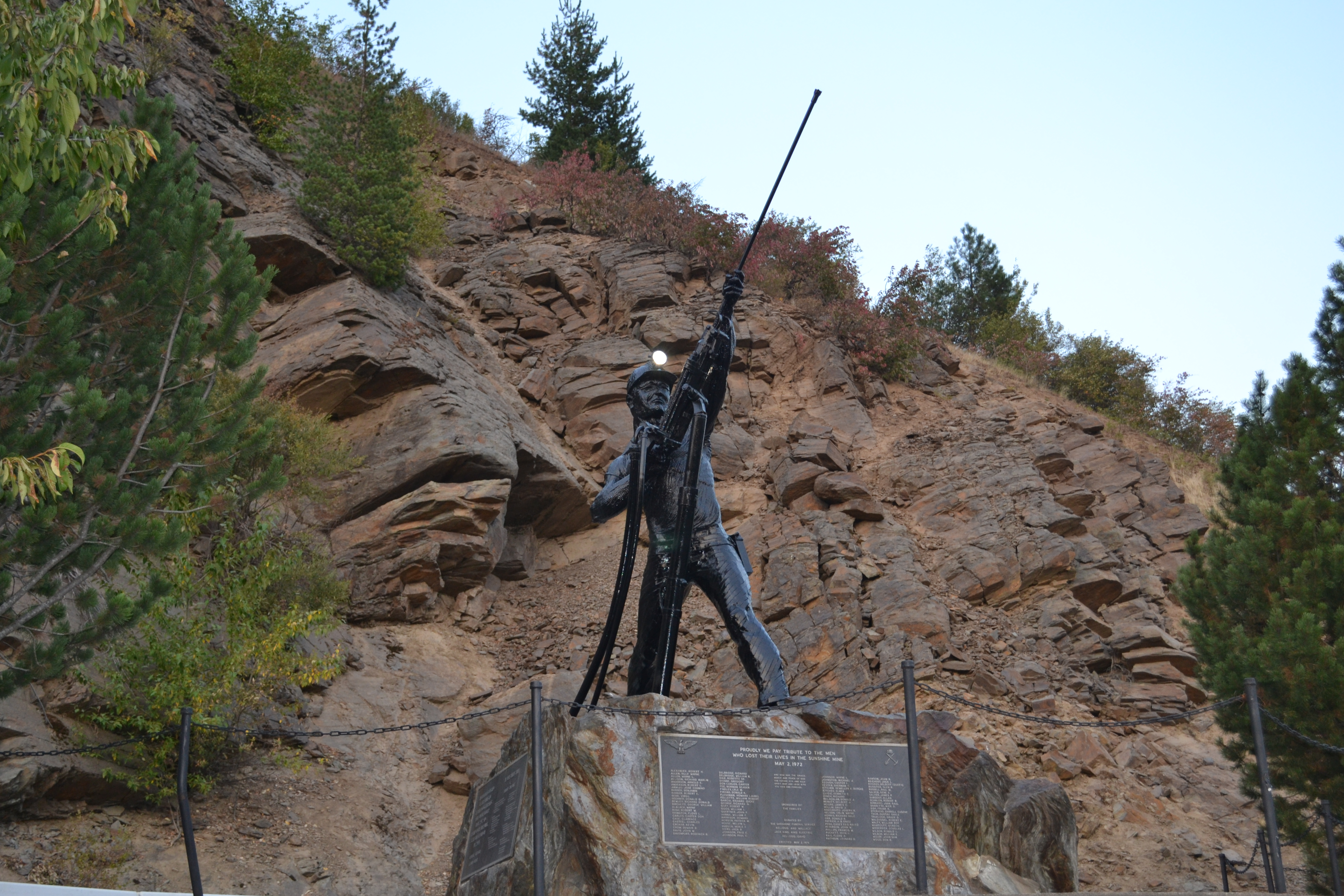
- Sunshine Miners Memorial

- Location within Idaho
- Location: Silver Valley (Idaho), Idaho, United States; 47.501840°N 116.070759°W
- Products: Silver, Copper, Antimony, Gold, Lead, Zinc, Uranium
- Type: Underground
- Discovered: 1884
- Opened: 1890
- Active: 1887–99, 1904–05, 1912–2001
- Closed: 2001

The Sunshine Mine is located between the cities of Kellogg and Wallace in northern Idaho. It has been one of the world's largest and most profitable silver mines, having produced over 360 million ounces of silver by 2001.

A 2007 Canadian report by Behre Dolbear & Company estimated measured and indicated resources of 31.51 million ounces of silver in 1.43 million tons at 21.8 ounces of silver per ton and inferred resources of 231.5 million ounces of silver in 2.28 million tons at 101.6 ounces of silver per ton. The Behre Dolbear report is considered historic in nature and illustrates the resource potential of the Sunshine Mine.

From historical records beginning in 1904, the Sunshine Mine has produced 364,893,421 ounces of silver from 12,953,045 tons of ore through 2001, when the mine was closed. From January 1, 1998, to January 1, 2004, the average reserves carried by the mine were 1.38 million tons, containing 32.20 million ounces of silver at 23.3 oz Ag/ton.

== Geography ==
The Sunshine Mine is on the east side of Big Creek waterway and south of the unincorporated community of Big Creek, Idaho, between Kellogg and Wallace. In a mountainous area, the mine entrance is approximately 2,790 feet (850 m) above sea level.

Sunshine Mine is just upstream from Crescent Mine, which operated between 1906 and 1986. Interstate 90 passes approximately two miles (3.2 km) north of the Sunshine Mine complex.

== History ==
=== Early history ===
The Sunshine Mine property had its beginning in September 1884 when brothers True and Dennis Blake filed a claim on a series of ore deposits in the Big Creek mining district in Shoshone County, Idaho.

The Blake Brothers, as they are frequently called, were natives of Maine. In the fall of 1876, for reasons unspecified in extant sources, the Blake Brothers began migrating west. They lived and worked in Chicago for some time before continuing west and settling in Washington Territory. According to court records, the Blake Brothers lived in Snohomish County, Washington Territory by October 1878. Sometime after November 1879 the brothers relocated to the east part of the territory, settling in the small city of Spokane Falls. By early 1880 the Blakes relocated to the Coeur d'Alene Valley in Idaho, where they homesteaded at the mouth of a stream named Big Creek, midway between the present cities of Kellogg and Wallace. Here the Blakes farmed for several years. In September 1884, they happened to locate the Yankee Boy and Yankee Girl ore deposits up Big Creek Canyon from their homestead.

It was these deposits, namely the Yankee Lode mining claim, that the Blake brothers staked in late September 1884. The two brothers mined their claim for the next two decades until poor health persuaded them to release control of the property to other interests. Following the death of True Blake in 1910, True's widow Hattie Blake and his brother Dennis opted to lease out the mining property. The property was leased to several individuals sometime on or about September 1912. The property went through a series of acquisitions in the years following, being leased and managed at various times by men such as Sidney Shonts and next Dan Price.

Price, President of the Big Creek Leasing Company, spent a large sum of money in an effort to reach ore reserves on the lower levels of the Blake Brothers previous workings. When unsuccessful, Price recruited Spokane businessman Eugene Tousley. Tousley, in turn, recruited John Sawbridge, a Yakima, Washington businessman and mining entrepreneur.

It is unclear exactly when Sawbridge became involved in the company, but he likely held stock when the Sunshine Mining Company was officially formed in 1918. At this time the company's headquarters were in Spokane, Washington. The original officers of the company were Eugene C. Tousley, E. Ely, and V.S. Ricaby. Tousley was a broker in the mining industry, working in Spokane. During this time W.F. Newton was manager of the company,

In approximately 1921 a group of businessmen and entrepreneurs from Yakima purchased a controlling interest in Sunshine Mining Company. John Sawbridge became and/or remained the President of the company. The Yakima businessmen who joined the Board at this time were Albert E. "A.E." Larson (a successful entrepreneur), Alexander Miller (also a civic leader), and Nathan P. "N.P." Hull (known for his successful orchards). Hull served on the Board of Directors until his death in July 1929. Three years after his death, in 1932, Hull's son Carroll M. Hull was named to the Board. Carroll Hull served on the Board of Sunshine until February 1965.

Following the death of Sawbridge in 1931, Larson became president and served the company in that capacity until his own death in 1934. At that time Robert M. Hardy (a Yakima native and President of the Yakima National Bank) became president. He served as President until his resignation in 1956, at which time his son succeeded him as President of the Company.

=== Mining operations ===
In 1921 a 25-ton per day mill was constructed. The mill was later expanded piecemeal and eventually reached a daily capacity of 500 tons. Soon after the concentrator was commissioned, the Sunshine tunnel was dug from the surface in an exploration effort that discovered higher quality ore historically identified as "Chinatown".

In 1935 the concentrator at the mine was upgraded with new ball mill grinding units and flotation cells. These increased the capacity to 1,000 tons per day while attaining a recovery of 98%. The sinking of the new four-compartment vertical Jewell shaft was started, reaching the 2300 level in 1936.

In 1943 a crew drifting east on the 2700 level following the Silver Syndicate fault discovered the famous Chester vein.

It was primarily the exploitation of the Sunshine vein followed by the Chester vein that determined the present configuration of the underground workings. With the discovery of the Chester vein on the 2700 level and the ore body's distance from the Jewell shaft of approximately 4000 feet east - southeast, other internal shafts (the No. 4, No. 5 and No. 10 shafts, more properly defined as winzes) were sunk or raised to more efficiently service the operations. The other principal internal shaft is the No. 12 shaft, servicing the Copper vein and the West Syndicate vein in the western end of the mine.

In 1957, under the Presidency of Robert M. Hardy Jr., Sunshine Mining Company drilled the Medina No. 1 oil well. This was located immediately north of the town of Ocean City on the coast of Washington State. This was a joint venture with J.W. Tanner, a businessman from Olympia, Washington with specific interests in the oil industry.

Sunshine Mining Company purchased Tanner's interest in the company in 1958. Sunshine's Medina No. 1 well would produce 12,500 barrels of oil and remains Washington State's only commercially producing oil well. In 1961 the well was capped and production stopped.

In 1960, sand-filling operations were introduced underground at Sunshine Mine. The mill tailings were classified so that the coarser material, approximately 45% of the total mill feed, was used for stope backfill.

=== Sunshine Mine Disaster ===
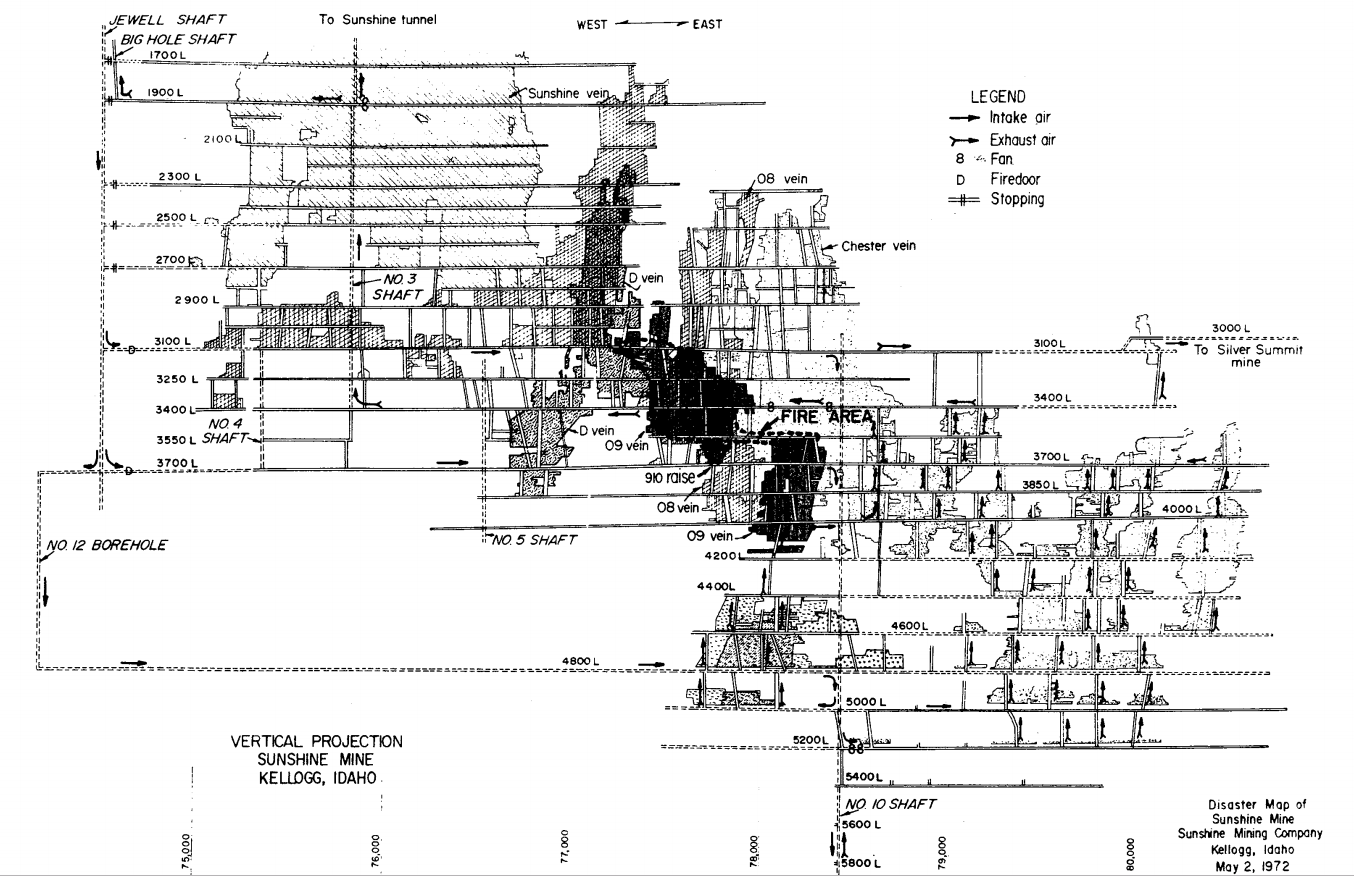
Sunshine Mine cross section at the time of the fire

Around 11:40 a.m. on May 2, 1972, smoke was discovered coming from the 910 raise on the 3700 level. As the smoke spread rapidly through the mine via the No. 10 Shaft, which provided the mine's air intake, Shaft Foreman Fred "Gene" Johnson ordered an evacuation at about 12:03 p.m. The plan was to hoist miners from the lower levels to the 3100 level, where they would be directed to make their way from the No. 10 Shaft to the Jewell Shaft for the final hoist to the surface. However, the No. 10 Shaft's main elevator, the chippy hoist, was immediately rendered useless when smoke overwhelmed its control room. This left the smaller double drum hoists to bring the men out, a process that started at 12:10 p.m.. However, at 1:02 p.m., the hoistman succumbed to the increasing smoke and carbon monoxide levels, leaving the men still below with no means of escape. Johnson, those assisting him, and a number of men newly-hoisted from below were also overcome, unable to reach the Jewel Shaft before they collapsed.

About the same time that hoist operations stopped, Safety Engineer Robert Launhardt was leading a makeshift rescue team equipped with oxygen masks towards the No. 10 Shaft. Although too late to assist Johnson, the team encountered and helped two survivors, the second of whom, Byron Schulz, was desperately pleading for oxygen. Don Beehner, a member of Launhardt's team, gave his own mask to Schulz, only to collapse moments later. Despite his colleagues' best efforts, Beehner could not be moved or revived, and had to be left behind while Launhardt concentrated on saving Schulz. Beehner would be the final confirmed death in the mine that day.

Of the 173 men in the mine at the time of the fire, 80 were able to evacuate, with the last one - Schulz - reaching the surface by 1:30 p.m. Two men on the 4800 level - Tom Wilkinson and Ron Flory - were able to find a safe zone near the No. 12 borehole, and would be rescued 175 hours later on May 9. The remaining 91 men died of carbon monoxide poisoning. 31 victims were found on the 3100 level, 21 on the 5200 level, 16 on 3700, 7 on 4400, 7 on 4800, 4 on 3400, 3 on 4200, and 2 on 5000. During body recovery, it was found that some of the men on 5200 had tried to build a barricade against the smoke, likely after losing contact with Johnson, but were overcome before they could finish it.

While the exact cause of the fire was never determined, several contributing factors to the high death toll were identified. These included the ventilation system, the early loss of the chippy hoist, inadequate fire/escape procedures, and lack of evacuation drills. One major factor involved the mine's re-breathers, known as self-rescuers, which could provide individual miners with 30 minutes of oxygen in contaminated air. It was found that most miners were unaware of how to use them, and so could not activate them, a task made more difficult by the fact that many re-breathers were out of date (some dating back to 1951) and in poor condition. In addition, most miners were equally unaware of the re-breathers' tendency to heat up in air with high carbon monoxide levels. This led some miners to discard their re-breathers, believing them defective, when, in fact, they were working properly.

A video about the Sunshine Mine disaster

The mine was closed for seven months after the fire. It was one of the worst mining disasters in American history, and the worst disaster in Idaho history. Today, a monument to the lost miners stands beside I-90 near the mine.

After the Sunshine Mine reopened and resumed full production, it regained its position as the number one silver producer in the Nation. In 1979 alone, Sunshine Mine produced 18% of the Nation's silver ore. By the end of 1988, the mine was at full production. Ore production was primarily from mining the Chester vein systems serviced by the No. 10 shaft and the remnants of the Sunshine and Rambo vein stopes, referred to as the Footwall area on the 3700 and 3400 levels. The 4000 and 4200 level Copper vein was under development from the No. 12 shaft.

=== Hunt takeover ===
The Hunt brothers began their attempt to corner the market of silver in 1973, secretly buying silver contracts. By 1974 they had contracts for 55 million ounces of silver, 9% of all silver stores. They took delivery, placing 40 million ounces in Switzerland and the remainder near the New York and Chicago markets. By 1975 they used Great Western, which they bought the previous year, to buy up commodities; the company had 21 million ounces of contracts by mid-1976.

In 1977, through Great Western United, the Hunt brothers attempted to take over the Sunshine Mine. This gave them control of another 30 million ounces and exempted them from new trading restrictions. They bought the mine's shares at a premium, which invoked the Williams Act. The acquisition was blocked by an Idaho law. Great Western sued on the grounds that the state law placed an undue burden on interstate commerce and pre-empted the Williams Act. Great Western and Sunshine Mine also sued each other in court, settling out of court in October 1977.

The Idaho law court case was also discarded on its merits, allowing Great Western to acquire the Sunshine Mining Company.

The Idaho law case went to the Supreme Court in 1979 (Leroy v. Great Western United Corp., 443 U.S. 173), having been found in Great Western's favor and appealed at each step by the state of Idaho over discussions of the appropriate venue. The Supreme Court case was decided on 26 June 1979, overturning Great Western's choice of Texas courts to sue Idaho. The Hunts lost their majority shareholder status in 1979 when part of the deal fell apart, and Sunshine sold their interest back to the mine.

Through a long series of events, the Hunts' cornering of the market led to Silver Thursday, a massive spike in silver prices on 27 March 1980. Changing exchange rules by the Commodities Futures Trading Commission (and a change in margin rules from Paul Volcker in the SEC) meant the Hunts were caught out on margin calls, leading to the bankruptcy of their empire.

== Post-Hunt era ==
In 1989, the mine produced 4.8 million ounces of silver. Production from the high grade Copper vein stopes began to impact the silver production volumes. During 1990, the mine produced 5.4 million ounces of silver, the most since 1971. By now the high-grade Copper vein stopes on 4200 level were becoming substantial producers, while production from the 10 shaft stopes was dropping off.

In 1991, the silver price fell to $3.90 (~$9.00 in 2025) per ounce and the operation was losing money. A mining plan was put together to reduce losses substantially while waiting for prices to improve. This was referred to as the "small mine plan" and was implemented in June 1991. The operation headings underground were centralized by shutting down the outlying, more costly production and development headings, and limiting operation to day shift only. The mining operations were consolidated in the Copper vein area and the most productive headings in the "Footwall Area". The mine below the 5000 level was salvaged and allowed to fill with water. Production was cut in half, while the work force was reduced by 65%.

The West Chance vein was discovered in 1992. By late 1996 it was clear the ore body was of sufficient size and value to support the mine's return to full production. The reserves were then developed by trackless ramp and lateral development methods using LHD (Load-Haul-Dump) equipment. The working areas outside the West Chance were shut down and salvaged in an orderly fashion and all resources were directed toward the West Chance. By July 1997, the mine workings below the 4000 level were salvaged of all usable equipment and materials and allowed to begin filling with water. In 1995, Sunshine acquired the neighboring Consolidated Silver (ConSil) property consisting of the surface facilities and underground workings of the Silver Summit Mine. This mine has served as the Sunshine Mine's second access for years. The ConSil underground mine workings are primarily accessed by an adit to an internal 5600 feet shaft. The surface opening of this adit is located about two miles east of the Jewell shaft.

=== Closure ===
The mine ceased production in the first quarter of 2001 because of several factors. These included low silver prices and the lack of regular and consistent exploration and development due to prior management shifting cash flow from the mine to corporate expenses, debt and other projects.

At closure the mine reserves were 1.13 million tons containing 26.75 million ounces of silver at 23.6 ounces Ag/ton. Upon closing of the mine these 'Historic' or 'Legacy reserves' were reclassified to 'mineralized material' as required by United States Securities and Exchange Commission regulations. These "Legacy Resources" are now classified as Mineral Resources under the CIM Definition Standards.

On November 2, 2009, Alberta Star Development Corp. announced that it has entered into a binding term sheet with Sterling Mining Company to acquire a controlling interest in Sterling and its assets and provide for financing of Sterling's ongoing operations. Alberta Star later gave up their pursuit of the mine in the face of competing interest.

On April 22, 2010, Sterling Mining Company announced that Court papers will be filed shortly seeking to approve a successful $24.0 million (~$33.6 million in 2024) bid for the assets and stock of Sterling Mining Company, the operator of the historic Sunshine Mine. The successful bidder—with a cash price of $24.0 million—was Silver Opportunity Partners LLC (SOP). SOP is a privately held company owned by Thomas Kaplan. It is based in New York as part of the Electrum Group of Companies, an international investor in precious metal mines.

On February 14, 2012, the mine was evacuated after a sensor in a vent shaft detected elevated levels of carbon monoxide inside. Twelve people were underground at the time, during the evening. All were workers for an underground mining services contractor called The Redpath Group, with headquarters in North Bay, Ontario, Canada. The mine was evacuated and sealed. All intakes feeding oxygen into the mine had to be sealed off, and nitrogen was injected to further reduce oxygen levels and extinguish the fire. On June 12, 2012, working under the guidance of the federal Mine Safety and Health Administration (MSHA) the seal was broken on the shaft and crews reached the mine's 3,100-foot level where the fire started. Gas readings at the 3,100 level showed no carbon monoxide and appropriate levels of oxygen, indicating the fire was out.

== Geology ==
The Coeur D'Alene District is hosted by rocks of the Pre-Cambrian Belt Supergroup, exceeding 20,000 feet in thickness. The Silver Belt is bounded by the Osburn Fault to the north and the Big Creek Fault to the south. The overturned Big Creek Anticline lies within the Polaris Fault to the north and the Big Creek Fault to the south, with maximum displacements of about 5000 feet. Ore deposits occur along veins within the northern limb of this anticline, with an E-W strike and dipping steeply to the south. The veins are composed of siderite, quartz and ankerite, with siderite making up the gangue. The ore mineral is tetrahedrite with 11% silver, making it freibergite. In 1930, an extremely rich ore body was discovered within the Sunshine Mine at the 1700 foot level, followed closely by the Crescent and Polaris mines. By 1937, the Sunshine Mine was producing more silver than any other mine in the world, with 13,971,196 fine ounces per 319,310 tons of crude ore. Additionally, the mine produced 3,091,085 pounds of copper, 1,479,175 pounds of lead, and 659 ounces of gold. By 1949, the Sunshine Mine had 186,000 feet of workings, including the 3900 vertical feet of the Jewell mine shaft, and drifts at the 500, 1700, 2300, 3100, and 3700 foot levels.

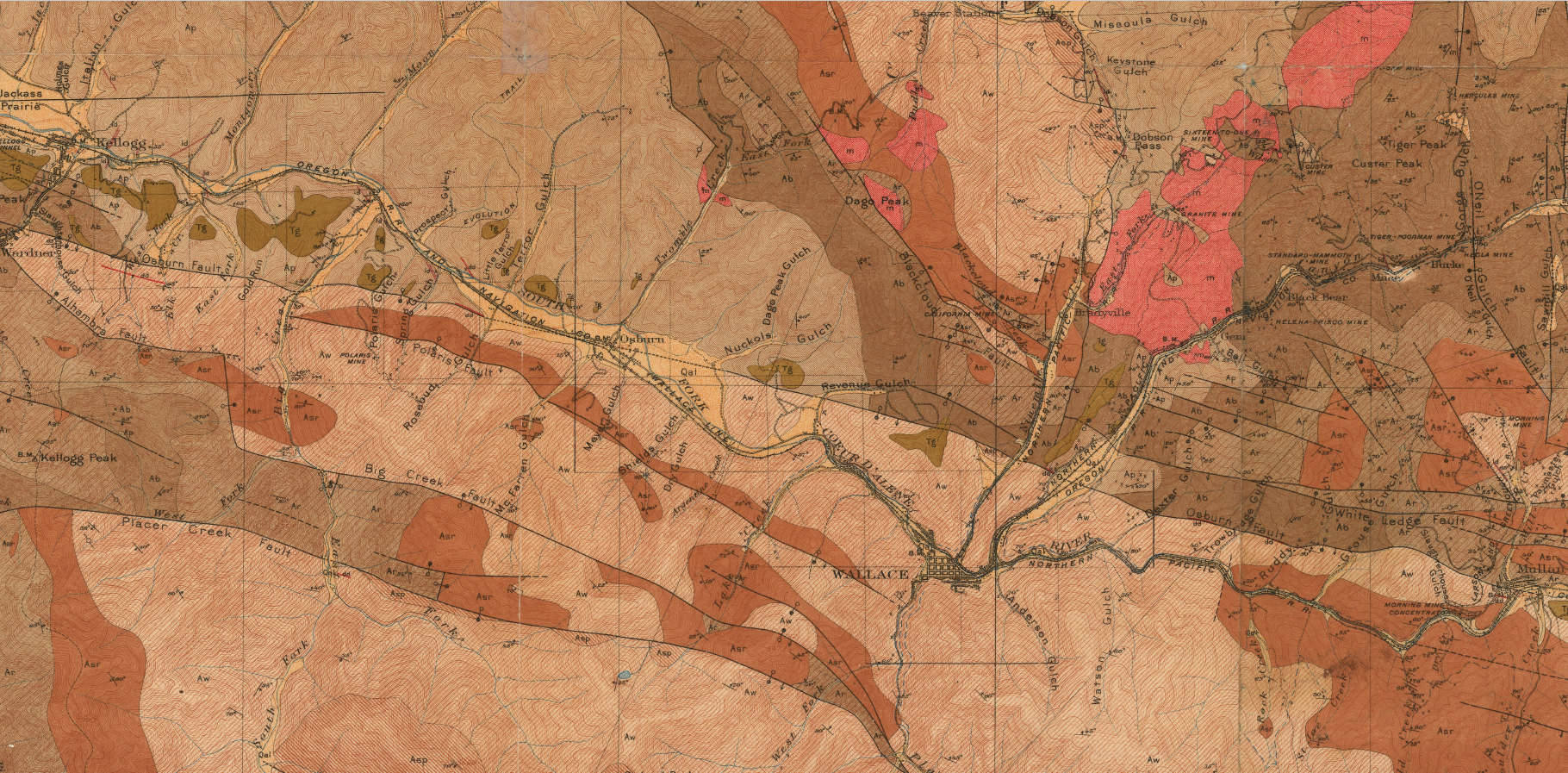
1907 geological map of the Silver Valley in Idaho, and the location of the Osburn Fault, the Polaris Fault, the Alhambra Fault, the Big Creek Fault, and the Placer Creek Fault (north to south).
