= Bunker Hill Mine and Smelting Complex =

Former smelter in Kellogg, Idaho, US

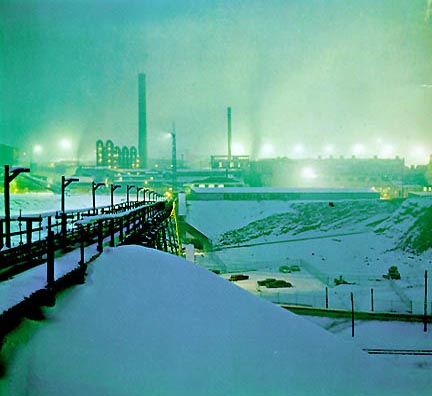
- Bunker Hill smelter in operation during the 1970s

- Location within Idaho
- Location: Silver Valley (Idaho), Idaho, United States; 47.541111°N 116.148056°W
- Products: Silver, Lead, Zinc, Gold, Copper, Cadmium, Antimony, Cobalt, Uranium
- Type: Underground
- Discovered: 1885
- Opened: 1886
- Active: 1886-1889, 1891-1981,1988-1991
- Closed: 1991
- Company: Bunker Hill Mining Corporation
- Website: bunkerhillmining.com

The Bunker Hill Mine and Smelting Complex (colloquially the Bunker Hill smelter) was a large smelter located in Kellogg, Idaho, in the Coeur d'Alene Basin. When built, it was the largest smelting facility in the world. It is located in what became known as the Silver Valley of the Coeur d'Alene Basin, an area for a century that was a center of extensive silver and other metal mining and processing. This resulted in extensive contamination of water, land and air, endangering residents including the Coeur d'Alene Tribe, which had traditionally depended on fish from the waterways as part of its subsistence.

In 1983 the United States Environmental Protection Agency added this area to the National Priorities List as a Superfund site for investigation and cleanup. In 1991 the Coeur d'Alene Tribe filed suit against the mining companies for damages and cleanup costs; they were joined by the federal government in 1996 and the state of Idaho in 2011. Settlement was reached with the two major defendants in 2008 and 2011, with an agreement for funding of $263.4 million plus interest for cleanup and restoration of habitat.

== History ==
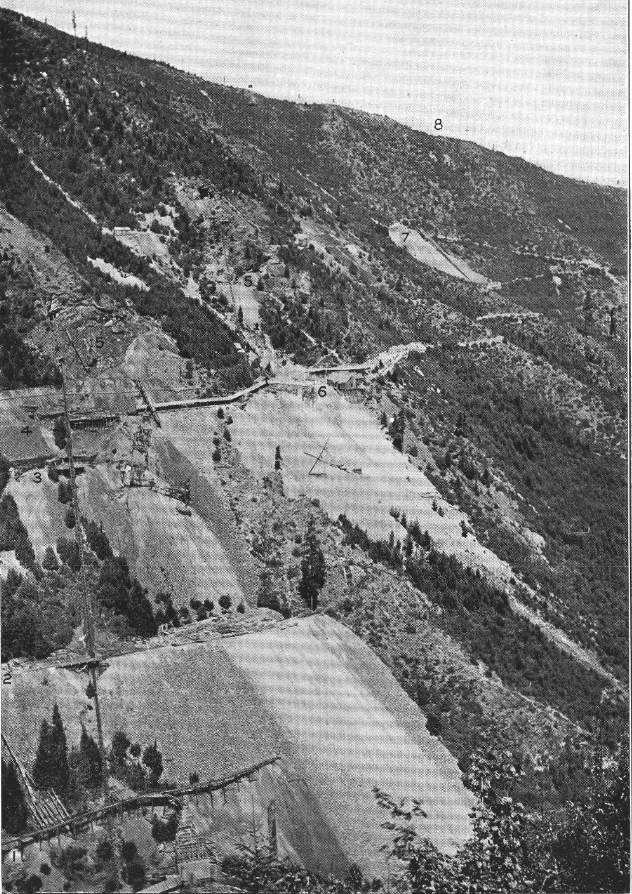
1904 image of the Bunker Hill Mine, including the Richmond (1) and Stemwinder (6) tunnels

Phillip O'Rourke filed the Bunker Hill mining claim on 10 September 1885, located along the west side of Milo Creek. Named after the Revolutionary War battle, the claim listed the date of discovery as 4 September, with Noah S. Kellogg as a witness. Similar claims were made by Noah Kellogg himself, Jacob Goetz and Cornelius Sullivan, which included the Sullivan claim on the east side of Milo Creek. Other claims followed, including the Last Chance by Charles Sweeny, the Stemwinder by George B. McAuley, and the Sierra Nevada by Van B. LeLashmutt. In all the stories recounting the original find, a jackass plays a key role in discovering the galena ore vein. A ruling by Justice Norman Buck awarded O.O. Peck and Dr. J.T. Cooper of Murray, Idaho, a quarter interest in the Bunker Hill claim, since those two provided the ore-discovering jackass as a grubstake to Noah Kellogg. Noah Kellogg subsequently leased the claim to Jim Wardner, who went on to found the town of Wardner, Idaho on 4 April 1886.

Milled ore was initially shipped by wagon to Kingston, Idaho, then by the steamship The Coeur d' Alene to Coeur d' Alene, Idaho, then by wagon to Rathdrum, Idaho, and finally loaded onto the Northern Pacific Railroad. Later, Daniel Chase Corbin built the Spokane Falls and Idaho Railway to connect Coeur d' Alene to the Northern Pacific Railway on the east side of Spokane, Washington, and the Coeur d' Alene Railway and Navigation Company railway to link Cataldo, Idaho with Burke, Idaho. Then in 1886, Corbin bought the Coeur d' Alene and a second steamship, the General Sherman, and built a new mill, which milled 100 tons of ore a day into refined ore containing 28 ounces of silver per ton. The ore was smelted in Wickes, Montana. In 1887, Corbin added a third steamship, the Kootenai. The steamships were replaced by a Northern Pacific and Union Pacific railway in 1891.

Simeon Reed bought the Bunker Hill Mine and Mill, and incorporated the Bunker Hill and Sullivan Mining and Concentrating Company on 29 July 1887. John Hays Hammond was hired to manage the mine, and a new concentrator, The Old South Mill, became operational in 1891, capable of 150 tons per day. A 10,000 foot long aerial tramway was installed to connect the adit in Wardner with the mill in Kellogg.

Frederick Worthen Bradley took over management of the mine in 1893, and became president of Bunker Hill Co.in 1897. He installed the first electric hoist in 1894, and replaced the haulage horses with a locomotive. In 1897, work started on a tunnel connecting the mine with Kellogg. Then, in 1898, he gained control of the ASARCO lead smelter in Tacoma, Washington, when Bunker Hill Co. and Alaska Treadwell purchased a controlling interest.

For years Bunker Hill, like other mines in the region, was the site of intense struggles between regional miners' unions and mine owners/managers. The owners of the Bunker Hill mine organized with other mine owners to form the Mine Owners Protective Association in order to fight the unions. The Bunker Hill owners repeatedly refused to meet or negotiate with union representatives, leading to regular community protests. On April 29, 1899, during a union demonstration, a group of workers hijacked a Northern Pacific train in Burke, Idaho and took it to Wardner. After a firefight with the Bunker Hill security guards, they dynamited the Bunker Hill and Sullivan ore concentrator, which was valued at $250,000. A new and more efficient mill, with greater capacity, was in operation within 3 months.

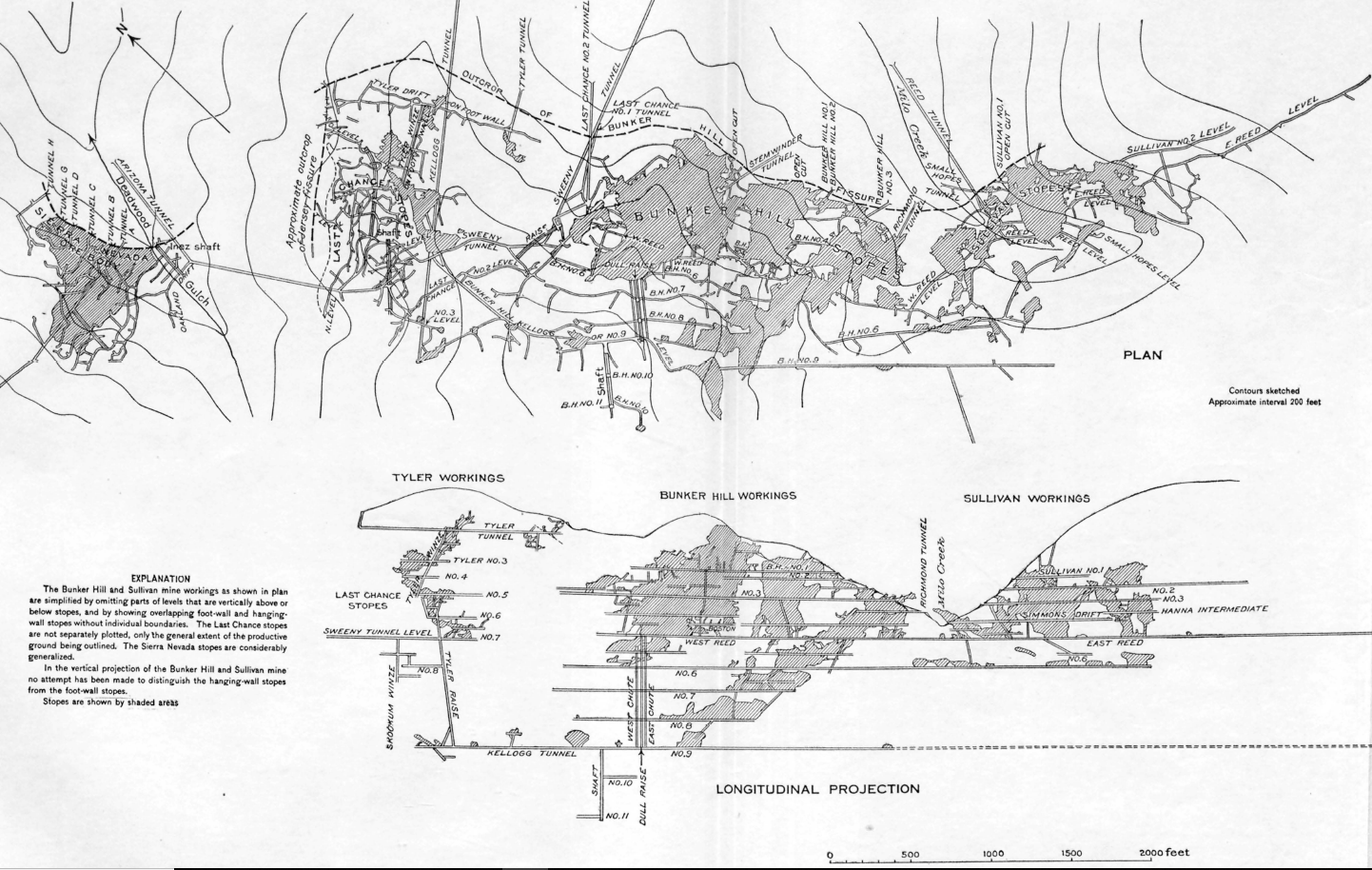

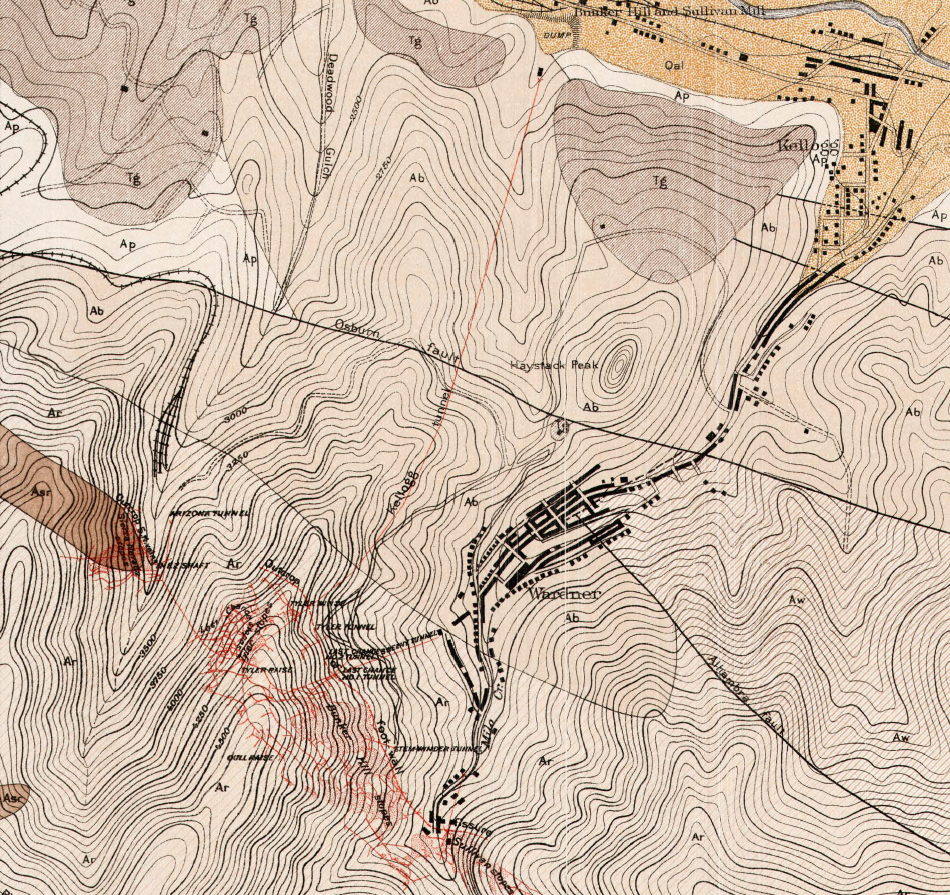
1904 map of the Bunker Hill Mine

1904 plan and cross section of the Bunker Hill Mine

In 1903, Washington Water and Power completed building over 80 miles of electrical transmission line between Spokane Falls and Burke, and the company upgraded to electrical machinery. This coincided with the company connecting all of the mines underground, and the completion of the over 12,000 foot Kellogg tunnel. Then, on 10 March 1904, the March ore body was discovered, substantially increasing the mine's reserves. Then, in a 1910 stock deal, Bunker Hill gained outright ownership of the Last Chance mine.

Bunker Hill Co. sold their ASARCO Tacoma smelter to the Guggenheims in 1905, but continued to process their concentrates there, in addition to using the Carnegie Co. and a smelter in Salida, Colorado. Yet, economics dictated Bunker Hill build its own smelter at Smelterville, Idaho, which it began operating on 5 July 1917. An improved concentrating process, which included the use of the Huntington roller mill, Callow screens, and Wilfley tables, produced concentrates of 75%.

A cadmium recovery plant was added to the zinc plant in 1929. This recovery system was replaced in 1945, when the company added a cadmium-processing facility to the smelter, which recovered high-grade cadmium from the smelter's fume and baghouse waste. Also during WWII, Bunker Hill added an antimony electrolytic plant, and because of the manpower shortage, employed about 200 women.

As the mine reached 400 feet below sea level, the company installed a Carrier Mine Spot Cooler. This cooler reduced the temperature from 87 °F (31 °C) to about 80 °F (27 °C), and the relative humidity from 96% to 84%.

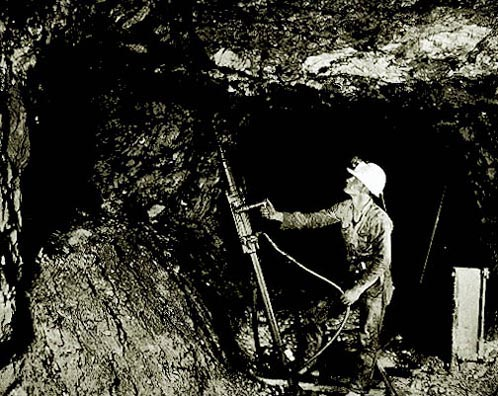
Miner extracting ore from Bunker Hill mine

In 1947, the mine started using block caving to mine lower grade ore bodies. By 1948, the mill had a 3000 tons per day capacity, the smelter produced almost 10,000 tons of lead per month, the zinc plant had a capacity of over 4000 tons of zinc per month, and the cadmium plant was capable of 50,000 pounds per month. The huge Shea ore body was discovered in 1949, at the No. 17 level.

In 1952, the company added a sulfuric acid plant with a 250-ton per day capacity. Most of this was sold to the J.R. Simplot Corp. for fertilizer use.

In 1981, parent company Gulf Resources & Chemical Corp., which had acquired Bunker Hill in 1968, announced it would close the mine and smelter complex, citing low metal prices, lack of concentrates, and a stricter EPA lead limit of 1.5 micrograms for air quality. At the time of its closure in 1982, the Bunker Hill lead smelter was the largest in the world, and the complex included a zinc plant and silver refinery.

The Coeur d'Alene people were able to regain control of a portion of Lake Coeur d'Alene, after a long history of their interests being ignored.

The over 100 buildings that made up the smelter complex were demolished. On May 27, 1996, the four smokestacks that made up the city skyline, the tallest being 715-feet, were laced with explosives and toppled. Phil Peterson, a man from Nampa, Idaho won a raffle to push the plunger to set off the explosives.

== Environmental issues ==
The process used by the first mills, known as "jigging", was very inefficient, often recovering less than 75% of the metal from the ore. This meant that large amounts of lead and other metals remained in the tailings, which were dumped in nearby waterways. Many of the mine tailings were dumped directly into the Coeur d'Alene River and its tributaries, which became polluted with high levels of sulfur dioxide, lead, and other metals. The water in the river turned opaque gray, earning the stream the nickname "Lead Creek."

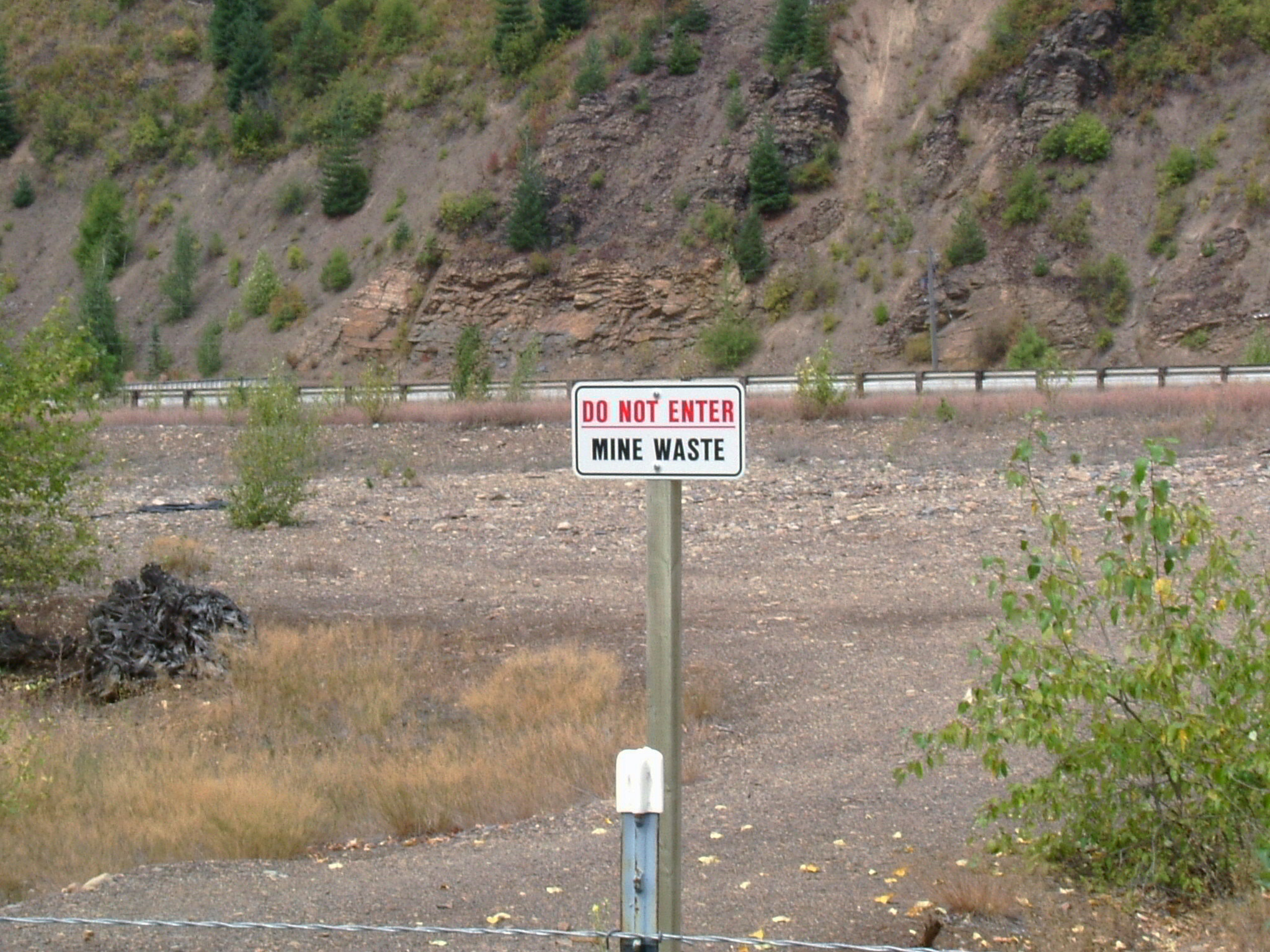
Mine waste warning sign

In 1899, farmers complained about the mine debris, and by 1910, 65 of them took the company to U.S. District Court. The farmers each received one dollar in damages, with the judge ruling the company could continue to dump debris into the streams. The company did build a tailings dam and later a tailings pond, but continued production despite additional suits. The company joined other mines in forming the Debris Association for litigation defense and payment of some claims.

Before the smelter was constructed, the company knew the smoke and fumes would be an issue, and the lead emissions were a health risk. In the words of the Public Health Service surgeon, Dr. Royd R. Sayers, written in 1918, "Whoever works in or about a lead smelter may become leaded." Yet, the 1924 Idaho Industrial Accident Board stated lead poisoning was an occupational disease not eligible for compensation. In other words, the miners assumed the risk by choosing to work. The company did have a compensation plan for victims, and implemented a Clauge electrolytic treatment in 1919, and a solarium in 1929. In an effort to reduce particles, the company installed a 14-unit Frederick Cottrell electrostatic precipitator, and 2800-bag baghouse to capture dust. In 1936, the company added an Impinger dust collector and an Owens jet-dust counter.

Prompted by a series of newspaper articles published in 1929, the Idaho State legislature formed the Coeur d'Alene River and Lake Commission in 1931. The commission was tasked with eliminating mine waste contaminating the Coeur d'Alene River and entering Lake Coeur d'Alene, a source of drinking water for Harrison, Idaho, and Coeur d'Alene, Idaho. The commission did determine mine tailings were the cause of the pollution, and mine owners were required to provide settling basins and employ a suction dredger at Cataldo, Idaho, starting in 1932. Yet, the commission determined the water was safe to drink, as long as consumption was limited to less than 2.4 gallons per day! Dr. M.M. Ellis of the U.S. Bureau of Fisheries determined the only solution to the pollution in the water system, and consequent lack of fish, was the complete exclusion of dumping mine wastes into the river. Yet, a 1948 deed granted that right to the company. In summary, though everyone, the company, the government, and the public, agreed tailings and smelter smoke polluted the region, the importance of the mine to the economy took precedent.

In the 1950s, the US Forest Service complained that fumes from the zinc plant were killing trees in the Coeur d'Alene National Forest. Yet the company continued to purchase pollution easements, use its political clout with the government, and tell the public that pollution was the cost of economic and employment benefits.

During the 1970s, the Idaho Department of Highways noted that bridges around Kellogg corroded faster.

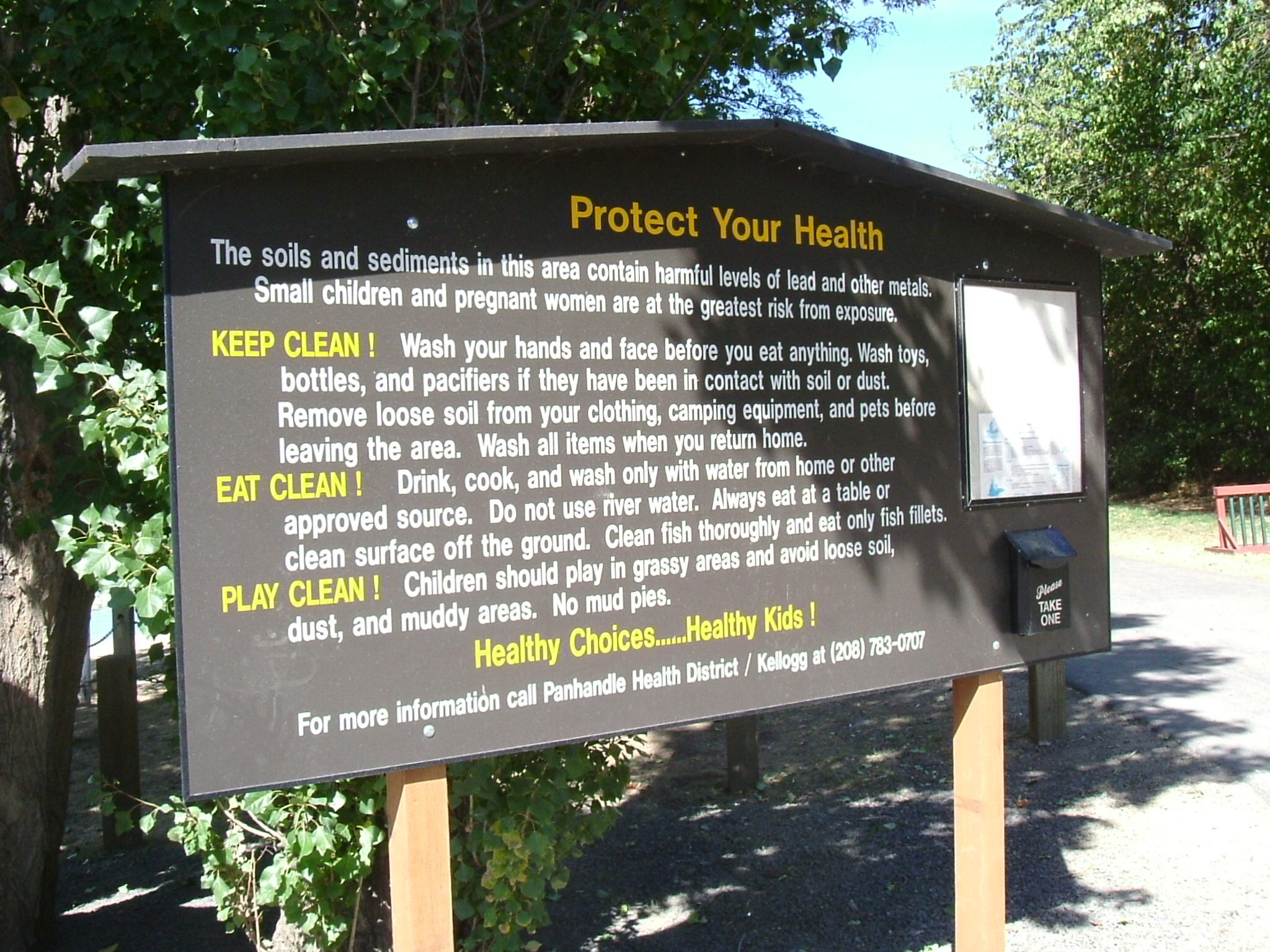
Health district PSA regarding heavy metals contamination

A fire on 3 Sept. 1973, damaged 2 of the 7 sections in the smelter baghouse. The baghouse was not back in normal operation until 17 March 1974. The company actually increased lead production during this period, taking advantage of increased prices. Lead emissions increased to 35.3 tons per month, compared to 8.3 tons per month from 1955 to 1964. Lead levels in Kellogg-Smelterville had increased to 13.2 micrograms per cubic meter in 1973, compared to 3.9 in 1971. After two Kellogg children were hospitalized for lead poisoning in 1974, the Centers for Disease Control and Prevention found 22% of the children within one mile of the smelter had lead poisoning, more than 80 micrograms of lead per 0.1 liter of blood, and almost all had more than 40. The Shoshone County Lead Health Project reported in 1975, that 45 children had lead poisoning, with one child having the highest blood lead level ever recorded. Children living in nearby areas began displaying very high blood lead levels. Approximately 26% of the two-year-olds in the region had dangerously high levels of lead in their blood, which had long-term negative consequences for their health, especially intellectual functioning and achievement.

Bunker Hill started employing women in the workforce again in 1972, which eventually included 30 in the smelter and 15 in the zinc plant, and the first to work underground. Yet, in 1975, the company banned fertile women from working in the smelter or zinc plant, due to the inherent risk. This type of ban was later prohibited due to United Automobile Workers v. Johnson Controls, Inc., 499 U.S. 187 (1991), which was a decision by the Supreme Court of the United States establishing that private sector policies prohibiting women from knowingly working in potentially hazardous occupations are discriminatory and in violation of Title VII and the Pregnancy Discrimination Act of 1978. The case revolved around Johnson Controls' policy of excluding fertile women from working in battery manufacturing jobs because batteries contain high amounts of lead, which entails health risks to people's reproductive systems (both men and women) and fetuses.

The company started revegetating 18,000 acres in 1972. In April 1975, Bunker Hill stated that employees with blood lead levels higher than 80 micrograms per 0.1 liters, had 90 days to reduce them or be dismissed. However, 1980 Occupational Safety and Health Administration (OSHA) rules required the company to remove employees with elevated blood lead levels with no reduction in pay, only allowing them to return when their levels dropped below 60 micrograms per 0.1 liter. Yet, over half of the smelter workforce exceeded 60. Even more stringent OSHA rules were to take effect in 1984.

The company shut down operations for 7 days in Dec. 1975, when it could not meet the EPA standards for SO_{2}. Bunker Hill had started the curtailment program in 1973 to deal with emissions not captured by the sulfuric acid plant. Then in 1976, the company decided to build a 715-foot stack at the lead smelter, and a 610-foot stack at the zinc plant, to better disperse emissions.

In 1983, the Bunker Hill smelter was added to the National Priorities List as a Superfund site by the United States Environmental Protection Agency. As of 2007, the EPA had spent $200 million attempting to remediate the site, much of which was spent removing contaminated topsoil from residential areas. The state of Idaho had also spent funds since the early 1980s on cleanup. While there were measurable improvements in environmental conditions, a vast amount of cleanup and restoration was still required.

== Coeur d'Alene 1991 lawsuit for damages and cleanup ==
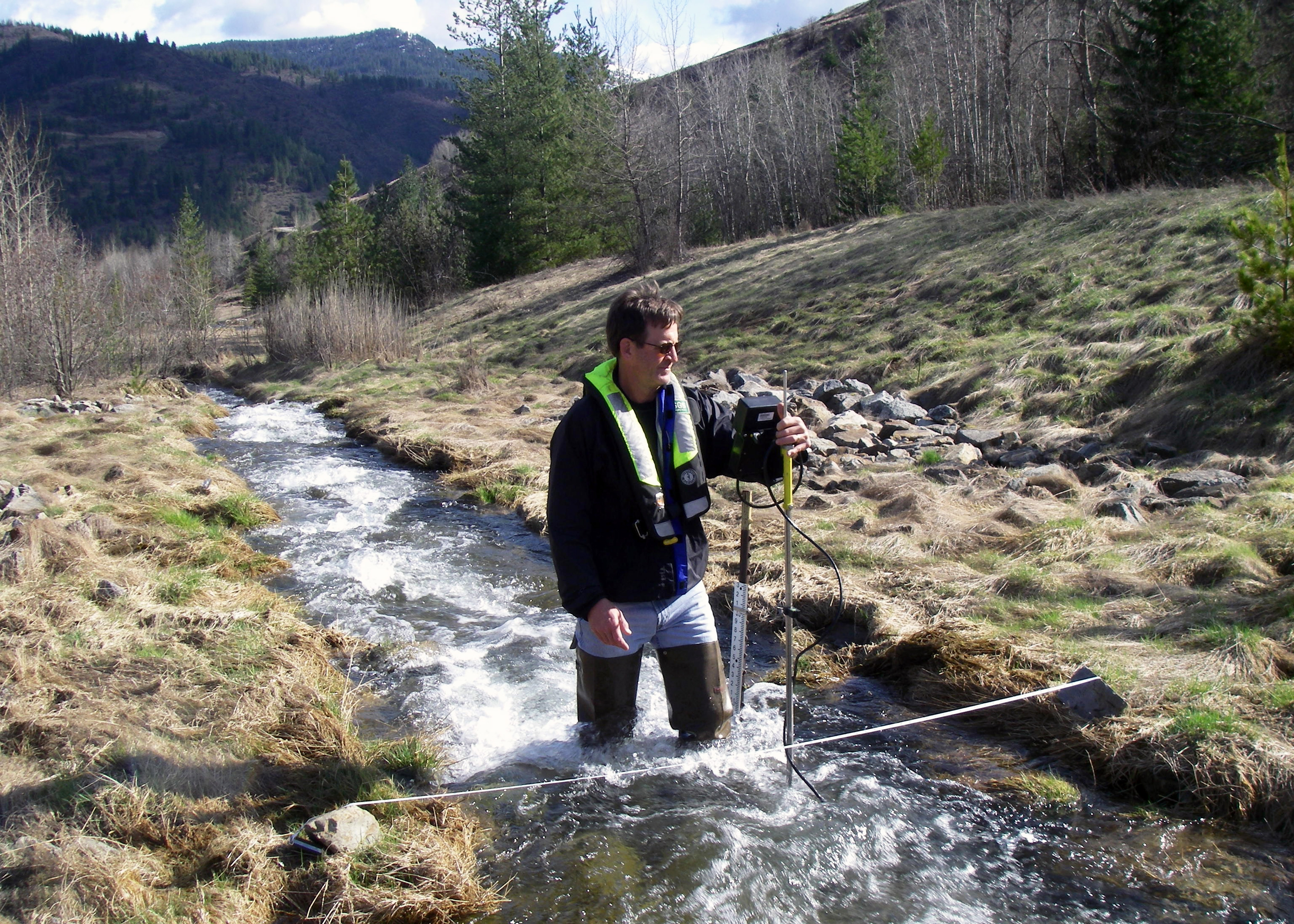
USGS hydrologist testing a tributary of the Coeur d'Alene River as part of an EPA program

In 1991 the Coeur d'Alene Tribe, concerned that progress was too slow at the Superfund site, brought suit against Hecla Mining Company, ASARCO and other companies for damages and recovery of cleanup costs of the site. In 1996 it was joined by the United States in the suit. In 2001 the United States and the Coeur d'Alene litigated a 78-day trial against Hecla and ASARCO over liability issues. In 2008, ASARCO, the other major defendant, reached settlement with the Coeur d'Alene and United States after filing for Chapter 11 bankruptcy.

In 2011 the government, the Coeur d'Alene, and the state of Idaho (which joined the suit to participate in settlement) reached settlement with the Hecla Mining Company to resolve one of the largest cases ever filed under the Superfund statute. Hecla Mining Company will pay $263.4 million plus interest to the United States and other parties to "resolve claims stemming from releases of wastes from its mining operations. Settlement funds will be dedicated to restoration and remediation of natural resources in the Coeur d'Alene Basin." The trustees intend to restore habitat for fish, birds and other natural resources, for stewardship while working for economic progress in the region.

== See also ==
- Bunker Hill Mining Company
- Coeur d'Alene, Idaho labor strike of 1892
- Hanford Site
- Lake Coeur d'Alene
- Spokane River
- Western Federation of Miners

== Bibliography ==
- Aiken, Katherine G. (August 1993). "'It May Be Too Soon to Crow': Bunker Hill and Sullivan Company Efforts to Defeat the Miners' Union, 1890-1900". The Western Historical Quarterly. 24 (3): 309–331. JSTOR 970753.
- Aiken, Katherine G. (Summer 2004). "'Not Long Ago a Smoking Chimney Was a Sign of Prosperity': Corporate and Community Response to Pollution at the Bunker Hill Smelter in Kellogg, Idaho". Environmental History Review. 18 (2): 67–86. JSTOR 3984793.
- Aiken, Katherine G. (2005). Idaho's Bunker Hill: the rise and fall of a great mining company, 1885-1981. University of Oklahoma. ISBN 978-0-8061-3682-0.
- Gerber, Jurg; Jensen, Eric L., eds. (2007). "Silver Valley Mining Pollution". Encyclopedia of white-collar crime. Greenwood Publishing. p. 261. ISBN 978-0-313-33524-2.
- Lindholdt, Paul J. (2011). "The Silver Valley". In Earshot of Water: Notes from the Columbia Plateau. University of Iowa Press. pp. 110–118. ISBN 978-1-58729-984-1.
- National Research Council Committee on Superfund Site Assessment (2005). Superfund and mining megasites: lessons from the Coeur D'Alene River basin. National Academies Press. ISBN 978-0-309-09714-7.
- Quivik, Frederic (Winter 2004). "Of Tailings, Superfund Litigation, and Historians as Experts: U.S. v. Asarco, et al. (the Bunker Hill Case in Idaho)". The Public Historian. 26 (1): 81–104. JSTOR 10.
