= National Register of Historic Places listings in Shoshone County, Idaho =

Location of Shoshone County in Idaho

This is a list of the National Register of Historic Places listings in Shoshone County, Idaho.

This is intended to be a complete list of the properties and districts on the National Register of Historic Places in Shoshone County, Idaho, United States. Latitude and longitude coordinates are provided for many National Register properties and districts; these locations may be seen together in a map.

There are 26 properties and districts listed on the National Register in the county. More may be added; properties and districts nationwide are added to the Register weekly.

This National Park Service list is complete through NPS recent listings posted November 6, 2026.

== Current listings ==
	Name on the Register	Image	Date listed	Location	City or town	Description
1	Avery Depot	Avery Depot	September 20, 1984 (#84001142)	St. Joe River Rd. 47°15′03″N 115°48′26″W	Avery	
2	Avery Ranger Station	Avery Ranger Station	June 27, 1974 (#74000748)	Near the St. Joe National Forest; 47°15′04″N 115°48′20″W	Avery	
3	Bullion Tunnel		September 20, 1984 (#84001160)	East of Avery; 47°24′04″N 115°42′04″W	Avery	
4	Cedar Snags	Cedar Snags	September 20, 1984 (#84001174)	North of Avery; 47°22′30″N 115°45′42″W	Avery	
5	Chicago, Milwaukee, St. Paul and Pacific Railroad Company Historic District	Chicago, Milwaukee, St. Paul and Pacific Railroad Company Historic District	October 26, 2000 (#00001269)	Idaho Panhandle National Forest; 47°21′37″N 115°38′43″W	Avery	Extends into Mineral County, Montana
6	John C. Feehan House	John C. Feehan House	August 27, 1980 (#80001334)	Main St. 47°37′36″N 115°51′05″W	Murray	
7	Grand Forks	Grand Forks	September 20, 1984 (#84001175)	East of Avery; 47°21′12″N 115°40′25″W	Avery	
8	Halm Creek, Bean Creek Fire		September 20, 1984 (#84001177)	South of Red Ives; 47°00′27″N 115°21′13″W	Red Ives	
9	Kellogg Boy Scout Cabin	Kellogg Boy Scout Cabin	September 22, 2021 (#100007006)	2 South Hill St. 47°32′13″N 116°07′40″W	Kellogg	
10	Magee Ranger Station	Magee Ranger Station	February 18, 1981 (#81000208)	West of Pritchard; 47°50′39″N 116°15′09″W	Pritchard	
11	Mallard Peak Lookout		April 12, 1984 (#84001178)	Southeast of Avery; 46°56′17″N 115°31′30″W	Avery	
12	Miner's Hat	Miner's Hat	September 23, 2021 (#100007007)	300 East Cameron Ave. 47°32′10″N 116°06′48″W	Kellogg	
13	Murray Courthouse	Murray Courthouse	November 14, 1978 (#78001098)	Main St. 47°37′36″N 115°51′15″W	Murray	Collapsed due to snow load in 1997; subsequently rebuilt in replica.
14	Murray Masonic Hall	Murray Masonic Hall	May 19, 1987 (#87000774)	Main St. between 2nd and 3rd 47°37′37″N 115°51′29″W	Murray	
15	Nine Mile Cemetery	Nine Mile Cemetery	September 30, 2025 (#100012276)	1001 Nine Mile Creek Road; 47°29′19″N 115°54′52″W	Wallace vicinity	
16	Northern Pacific Railway Depot	Northern Pacific Railway Depot	April 2, 1976 (#76000681)	219 6th St. 47°28′24″N 115°55′25″W	Wallace	Built in 1906, relocated in 1986 due to Interstate 90 construction.
17	Pine Creek Baptist Church	Pine Creek Baptist Church	November 17, 1982 (#82000361)	Main and S. 3rd Sts. 47°32′19″N 116°14′13″W	Pinehurst	Designed by Tourtellotte & Hummel, built in 1932
18	Edward Pulaski Tunnel and Placer Creek Escape Route	Edward Pulaski Tunnel and Placer Creek Escape Route	September 20, 1984 (#84001179)	Southwest of Wallace; 47°26′58″N 115°57′24″W	Wallace vicinity	
19	Red Ives Ranger Station	Red Ives Ranger Station	September 13, 1986 (#86002151)	Southeast of Avery on Forest Service Rd. 218; 47°03′22″N 115°21′08″W	Avery	
20	St. Andrew's Episcopal Church	St. Andrew's Episcopal Church	April 1, 1999 (#99000419)	104 Hunter St. 47°28′12″N 115°48′11″W	Mullan	
21	Shoshone County Poor Farm		October 30, 2026 (#100013556)	99, 179, and 224 Satherfield Road; 47°29′42″N 115°57′30″W	Silverton	
22	U.S. Post Office – Kellogg Main	U.S. Post Office – Kellogg Main	May 30, 1990 (#89002118)	302 S. Division St. 47°32′04″N 116°07′18″W	Kellogg	
23	U.S. Post Office – Wallace Main	U.S. Post Office – Wallace Main	March 16, 1989 (#89000137)	403 Cedar St. 47°28′21″N 115°55′36″W	Wallace	
24	Wallace 1910 Fire Memorial	Wallace 1910 Fire Memorial	September 20, 1984 (#84001180)	North of Wallace; 47°29′16″N 115°54′56″W	Wallace vicinity	
25	Wallace Carnegie Library	Wallace Carnegie Library	February 3, 1981 (#81000209)	415 River St. 47°28′27″N 115°55′34″W	Wallace	
26	Wallace Historic District	Wallace Historic District	August 10, 1979 (#79000809)	Roughly bounded by Oak, Silver, C, Mullan, Canyon, Fir, and 1st Sts. 47°28′20″N 115°55′34″W	Wallace	

== See also ==
- List of National Historic Landmarks in Idaho
- National Register of Historic Places listings in Idaho
