= Wallace 1910 Fire Memorial =

- U.S. National Register of Historic Places
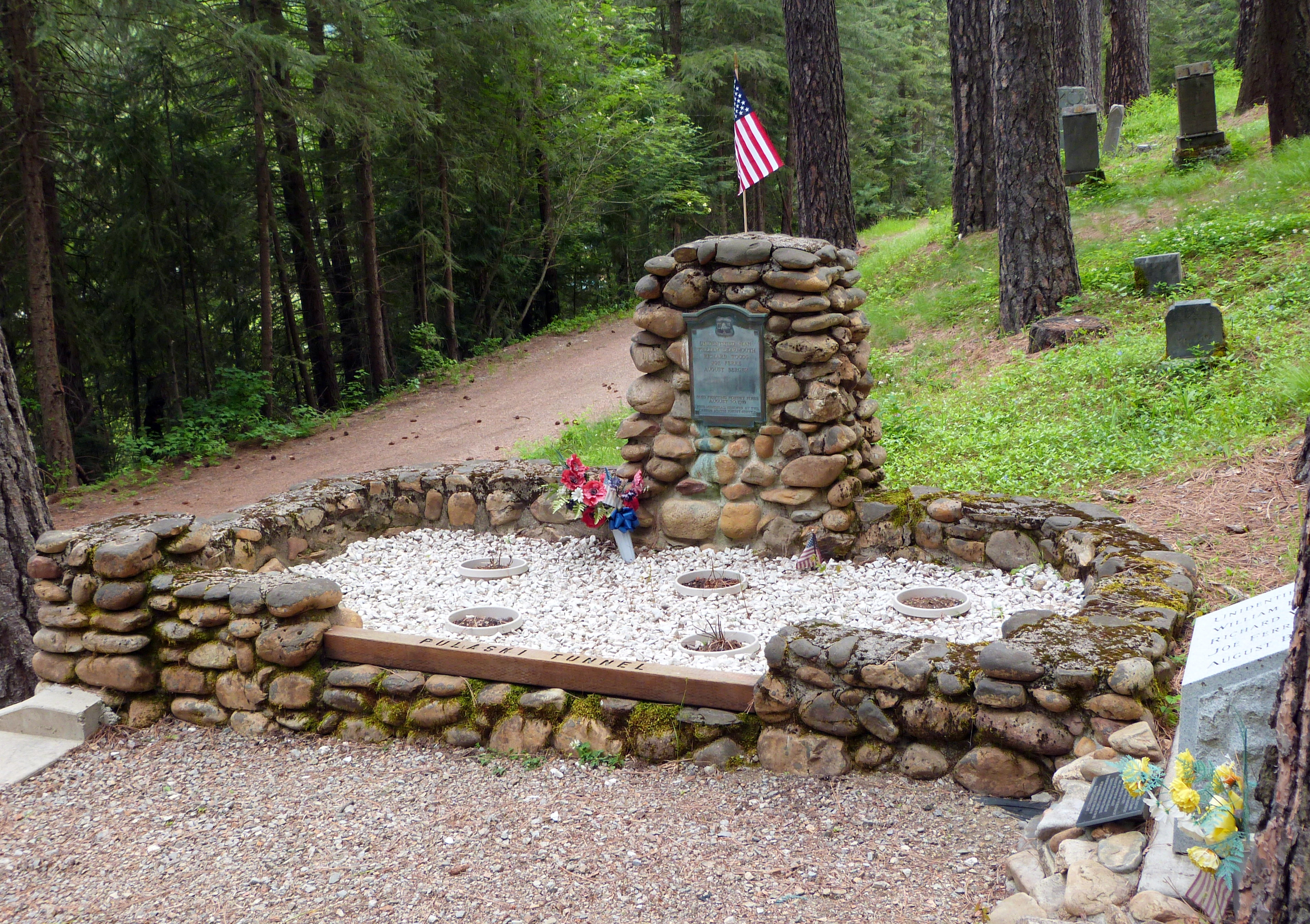
- Wallace 1910 Fire Memorial

- Location within Idaho Location within the United States
- Location: Nine Mile Cemetery, near Wallace, Idaho
- Coordinates: 47°29′18″N 115°54′51″W
- Area: 5 acres (2.0 ha)
- Built: 1910
- MPS: North Idaho 1910 Fire Sites TR
- NRHP reference No.: 84001180
- Added to NRHP: September 20, 1984

The Wallace 1910 Fire Memorial, near Wallace, Idaho, was listed on the National Register of Historic Places in 1984.

It consists of two cobblestone monuments in the Nine Mile Cemetery, erected in 1921 by the United States Forest Service, with associated graves of firefighters who died in the Great Fire of 1910.

One commemorates five men who died at the West Fork of Placer Creek, fighting forest fires on August 20, 1910. The other commemorates six men who died at the Bullion Mine.

== See also ==
- South Boise Fire Station
- National Register of Historic Places listings in Shoshone County, Idaho
