= Secretary of Defense Employer Support Freedom Award =

United States government award

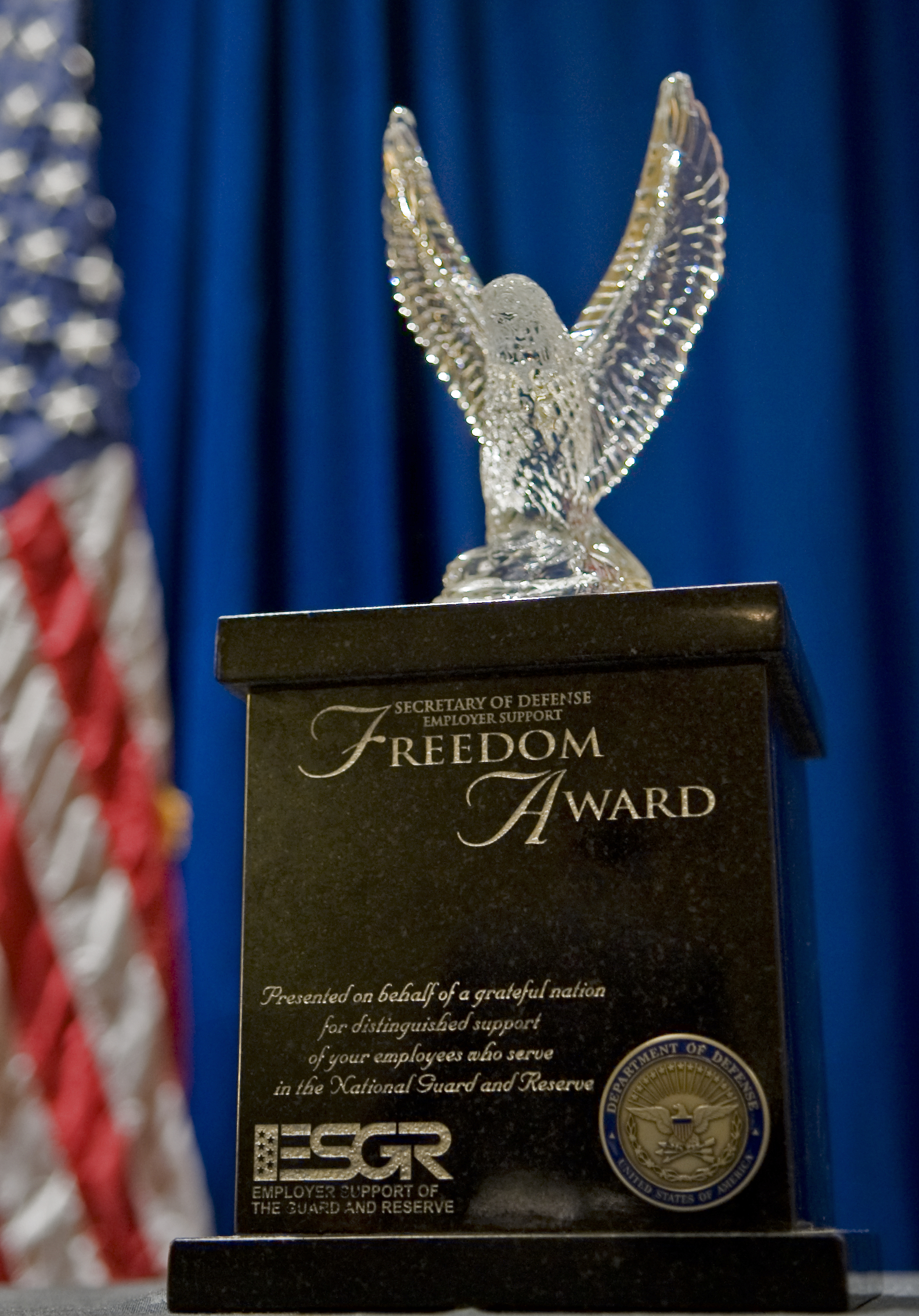
Freedom Award Statue

The Secretary of Defense Employer Support Freedom Award is the highest recognition given by the U.S. Government to employers for their support of their employees who serve in the National Guard and Reserve. To be eligible for the award, an employer must be nominated by one of its Guard or Reserve employees, or a family member of that employee.

The Freedom Award was instituted in 1996 by then-Secretary of Defense William Perry under the auspices of the National Committee for Employer Support of the Guard and Reserve (ESGR). ESGR is a Department of Defense agency established in 1972 whose mission, according to its website, is to "gain and maintain employer support for Guard and Reserve service by recognizing outstanding support, increasing awareness of the law, and resolving conflicts through mediation." The award was created to recognize the ways the nation's employers support their Guard and Reserve employees, and is the highest in a series of ESGR awards that include the Patriot Award, the Above and Beyond Award, and the Pro Patria Award.

A senior Defense Department official presents the awards at a dinner ceremony in Washington, DC; past presenters have included the secretary of defense, the under secretary of defense for personnel and readiness, the Army vice chief of staff, and the vice chairman of the Joint Chiefs of Staff. Since 1996, over 300 employers have received the Freedom Award.

== Freedom Award website ==
In 2008, ESGR launched a website for the Freedom Award. Using videos, news articles, profiles of recipients, and tips about employer best practices, the site provides information about the support that employers across the nation provide to their Guard and Reserve employees and their families. The site also houses the nomination form for the award.

== Recipients ==
=== 1996 ===
- McDonnell Douglas
- National Life of Vermont
- Schneider National
- Tektronix, Inc.
- United Parcel Service, Central Florida District

=== 1997 ===
- Charles Machine Works, Inc.
- East Penn Manufacturing Co.
- Entec Services, Inc.
- Fred Meyer, Inc.
- The Home Depot, Southeastern Division

=== 1998 ===
- American Airlines
- American Family Mutual Insurance Company
- CSX Transportation, Inc.
- Portland Police Bureau
- Wiremold Company

=== 1999 ===
- British Nuclear Fuels Limited, Inc.
- General Fire and Safety Equipment Company, Inc.
- Hitchiner Manufacturing Co., Inc.
- Kaiser Permanente, Northwest
- The State of Louisiana

=== 2000 ===
- American Express
- Framatome Connectors USA
- Intel Corporation
- Midwest Express Airlines
- Technology Concepts and Design

=== 2001 ===
- BAE Systems
- The Boeing Company
- The City of Bedford, Virginia
- Electronic Data Systems
- Southwest Airlines, Inc.

=== 2002 ===
- Autoliv, Inc.
- General Dynamics Corporation
- Public Service Company of New Hampshire
- State of Wyoming
- United Parcel Service Airlines

=== 2003 ===
- Central Atlantic Toyota Distribution Center
- D.H. Griffin Wrecking Co.
- Miller Brewing Company
- PG&E Corporation
- Tyson Foods, Inc.

=== 2004 ===
- Adolph Coors Company
- American Express Company
- Bank One Corporation
- Colt Fire Safety and Rescue
- General Electric Company
- Harley-Davidson, Inc.
- The Home Depot
- Los Angeles County Sheriff’s Department
- State of Minnesota
- Northrop Grumman Corporation
- One Source Building Technologies
- Saints Memorial Medical Center
- Sprint Corporation
- Strategic Solutions, Inc.
- Wal-Mart Stores, Inc.

=== 2005 ===
- Alticor, Inc.
- Citizens Financial Group
- Eaton Corporation
- Enterprise Rent-a-Car
- IDACORP
- Los Angeles Police Department
- Louisiana Department of Public Safety & Corrections
- Pioneer Financial Services, Inc.
- Ryland Homes
- Sears, Roebuck and Company
- South Dakota State University
- State of Delaware
- Toyota Motor Sales, U.S.A., Inc.
- USAA
- Wachovia Corporation

=== 2006 ===
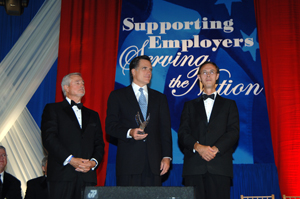
Mitt Romney receiving the award on behalf of the Commonwealth of Massachusetts in 2006

- AgCountry Farm Credit Services
- Allianz Life Insurance Company of North America
- Baptist Health
- BNSF Railway Company
- Cardi's Furniture Superstores
- Commonwealth of Massachusetts
- Computer Sciences Corporation
- DuPont
- Fred Fletemeyer Company
- MGM Mirage
- Skyline Membership Corporation
- South Dakota Game, Fish and Parks
- Starbucks Corporation
- State of Vermont
- Sun Valley General Improvement District

=== 2007 ===
- Augustine and Sons, Inc.
- CHE Consulting, Inc.
- Con-way, Inc.
- Creative Healthcare Solutions, Inc.
- Dollar Thrifty Automotive Group, Inc.
- Ganntt's Excavating and Contracting, Inc.
- General Motors Corporation
- The New Hampshire State Police
- Nucor Corporation
- Sierra Pacific Resources
- Sodexho USA
- The State of Tennessee
- Turbocam International
- Ultra Machining Company, Inc.
- Wilmington, VA Medical Center

=== 2008 ===
- Choctaw Nation of Oklahoma
- Chrysler LLC
- City of Austin, Texas
- Coastal Windows, Inc.
- Dominion Resources Inc.
- Jersey City Fire Department
- Lochinvar Corporation
- Oakland County Sheriff’s Office
- Oshkosh Corporation
- Regional Emergency Medical Services Authority
- Robinson Transport, Inc.
- State Farm Mutual Automobile Insurance Company
- Union Pacific Corporation
- Winner School District
- Womble Carlyle Sandridge & Rice, PLLC

=== 2009 ===
- Aerodyn Wind Tunnel LLC
- AstraZeneca Pharmaceuticals
- Cambridge Fire Department
- Consolidated Electrical Distributors, Inc.
- First Data Corporation
- FMC Technologies
- Jackson Parish Sheriff's Department
- Marks, O'Neill, O'Brien & Courtney
- Microsoft Corporation
- Mid America Kidney Stone Association
- NetJets
- Ohio Department of Public Safety
- Perpetual Technologies, Inc.
- Santa Ana Police Department
- TriWest Healthcare Alliance

=== 2010 ===
- Bill Bragg Plumbing
- City of Irvine Police Department
- Dollar General Corporation
- East Carolina University
- Food Lion
- Franklin's Printing
- Intuit Inc.
- Legacy Sports International
- Logistics Health Inc
- MERCK
- Michigan State Police
- Newmont Mining Corporation
- Southern Company
- State of Hawaii
- Yerecic Label

=== 2011 ===
- 3M Company
- Ameren Corporation
- Burt County Sheriff's Office
- CSX Transportation
- Electrical Contractors Inc.
- Ford Motor Company
- Hanson Professional Services Inc.
- Integrity Applications Incorporated
- Orange County Sheriff's Department
- The Principal Financial Group
- Qwest Communications, now CenturyLink, Inc.
- St. John's Lutheran Church
- State Employees' Credit Union
- Town of Gilbert
- Wells Fargo & Company

=== 2012 ===
- Basin Electric Power Cooperative
- Caterpillar Inc.
- Citi
- Crystal Springs United Methodist Church
- Delta Air Lines
- Gary Jet Center
- iostudio
- Kalamazoo Department of Public Safety
- L-3 Communications
- Nyemaster Goode
- Port of Seattle
- Siemens Corporation
- Tennessee Valley Authority
- Uniform Color Company
- Verizon Wireless

=== 2013 ===
- Albuquerque Fire Department
- Bank of America
- C.W. Driver
- City of Columbus
- Colorado Springs Utilities
- Davita, Inc
- Eastman Chemical
- Family Allergy & Asthma
- Humana
- Pape-Dawson Engineers
- Richland County Sheriff's Department
- Safeway Inc
- Steel Plate Fabricators
- U.S. Bank
- U.S. Marshals Service

=== 2014 ===
- Arizona Public Service
- AT&T
- Capital One
- CH2M-WG Idaho
- General Mills
- JG Management Systems, Inc
- Los Angeles Fire Department
- New Hampshire Department of Environmental Services
- PNC Bank
- Shofner Vision Center
- Smart Mouth
- St. Jude Children's Research Hospital
- UNC Health Care
- Washoe County School District
- Zions Bank

=== 2015 ===
- Black Hills Corporation
- Boise Fire Department
- BP America, Inc.
- Cardinal Health
- Cigna
- City of Glendale
- City of Shawnee
- College of the Ozarks
- CVS Health
- Devon Energy
- Dr. Joe A. Jackson, MD, PLLC
- Neil, Dymott, Frank, McFall, Trexler, McCabe & Hudson APLC
- Snell and Wilmer, LLP
- Town of Hingham, MA
- Walt Disney Co.

=== 2016 ===
- Alaska Airlines
- Albuquerque Police Department
- Benjamin Franklin Plumbing
- Burford Corporation
- Carolinas Healthcare System
- Clackamas County Sheriff Office
- Delmarva Veteran Builders
- Fastsigns International Inc.
- Hope Valley Industries
- Idaho State Police
- Lowe’s
- Maryland State Police
- Prairie Grove Consolidated School District 46
- Seattle Fire Department
- The Goodyear Tire and Rubber

=== 2024 ===
- Bartlett Roofing
- Blue Cross Blue Shield Minnesota
- Cordia
- Core States Group
- Council Bluffs Fire Department
- Fulton Bank
- Kiewit Infrastructure Co.
- League of Minnesota Cities
- Navy Federal Credit Union
- Orange County Sheriff's Office
- PSA Management, Inc.
- SAS Institute Inc.
- Shelby County Fire Department
- Sherpa 6
- Tucson Electric Power

== Sources ==
This article contains information from a U.S. Government website in the public domain.
