= Murray Masonic Hall =

- U.S. National Register of Historic Places
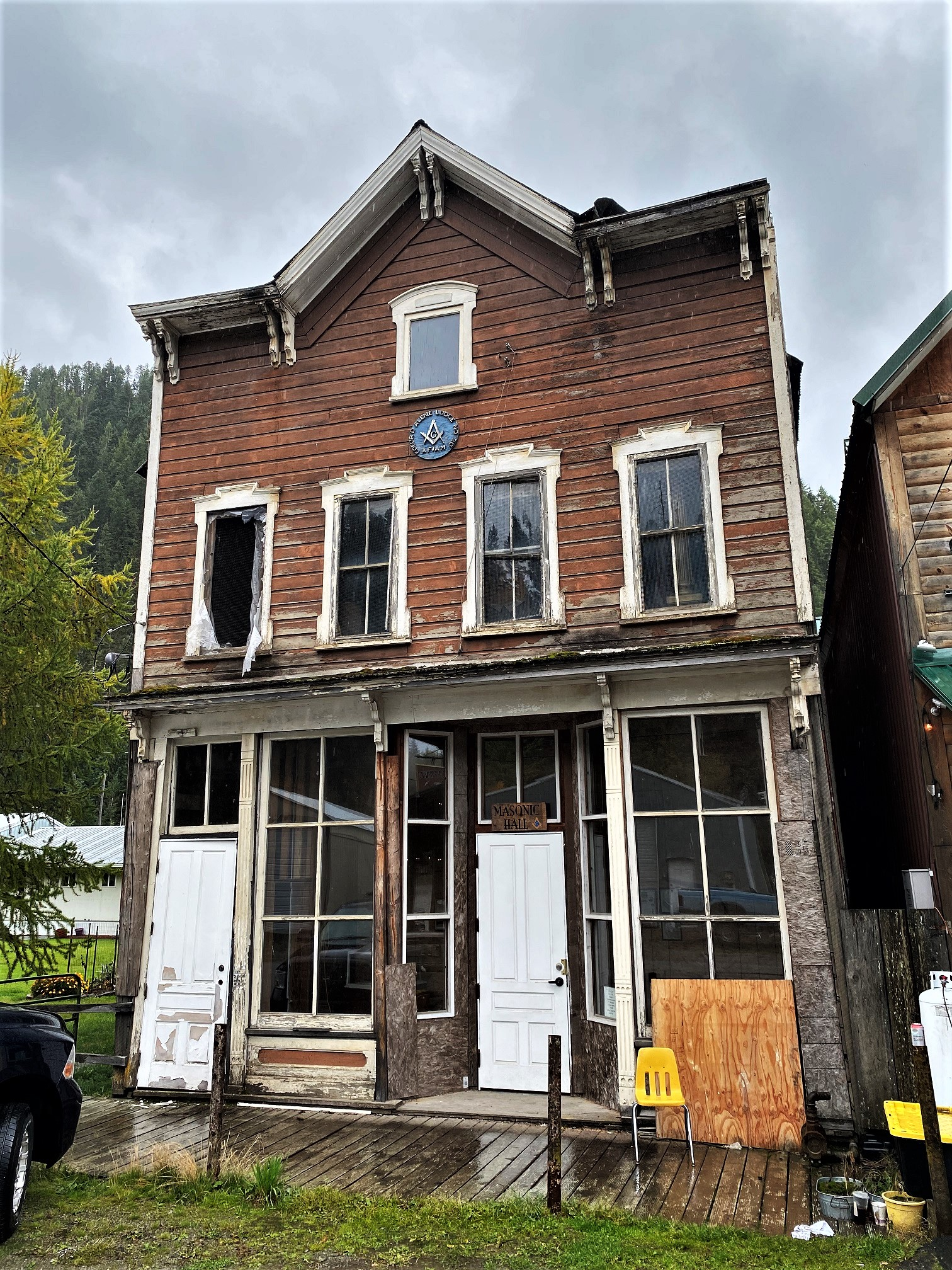

- Location within Idaho Location within the United States
- Location: Main St. between Second and Third, Murray, Idaho
- Coordinates: 47°37′37″N 115°51′29″W
- Area: less than one acre
- Built: 1884
- Architectural style: Italianate, Masonic Temple
- NRHP reference No.: 87000774
- Added to NRHP: May 19, 1987

The Murray Masonic Hall is a historic Masonic building in Murray, Idaho. Built in 1884, it was listed on the National Register of Historic Places in 1987.

As of 2011 it continued to serve as a home for Coeur d'Alene Lodge #20.
