= South Boise Fire Station =

- U.S. National Register of Historic Places
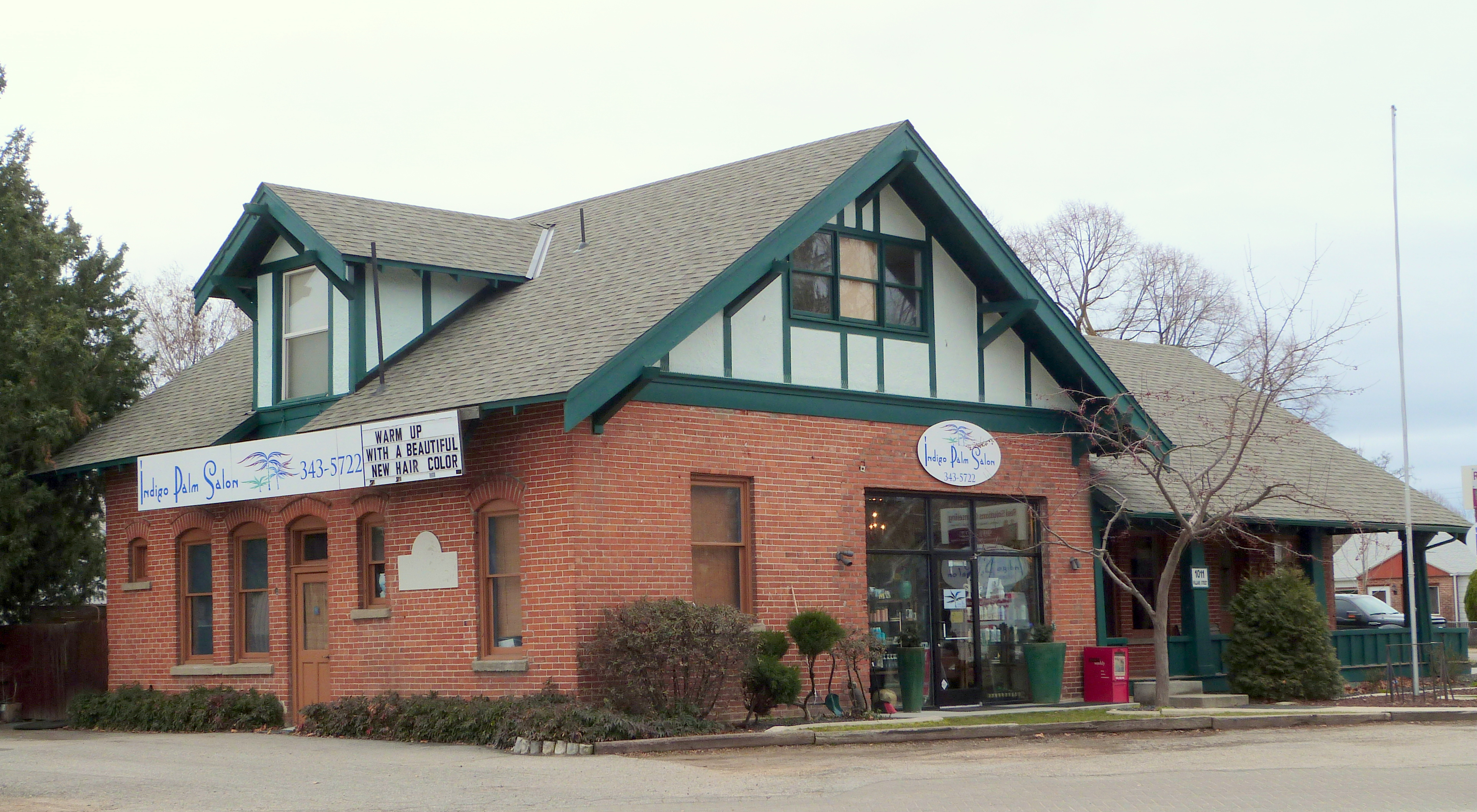

- Location within Idaho Location within the United States
- Location: 1011 Williams St., Boise, Idaho
- Coordinates: 43°35′26″N 116°11′40″W
- Area: less than one acre
- Built: 1914
- Built by: Walsh, J. P.
- Architect: Tourtellotte & Hummel
- Architectural style: Bungalow/craftsman
- MPS: Tourtellotte and Hummel Architecture TR
- NRHP reference No.: 82000243
- Added to NRHP: November 17, 1982

The South Boise Fire Station, at 1011 Williams St. in Boise, Idaho, was built in 1914. It was designed by architects Tourtellotte & Hummel for the Boise Fire Department. It was listed on the National Register of Historic Places in 1982.

It is a one-and-a-half-story brick bungalow style building, 68 by 36 feet (21 m × 11 m) in plan.

It was designed in 1913 and was completed in 1914.

== See also ==
- Wallace 1910 Fire Memorial
- National Register of Historic Places listings in Ada County, Idaho
