= Nellie Stockbridge =

American photographer (1868-1965)

- Born: Nellie Jane Stockbridge; 1868; United States
- Died: 1965 (aged 96–97)
- Known for: Photography

Nellie Stockbridge (1868 – May 22, 1965) was an early Idaho frontier mining district photographer.

== Biography ==
Stockbridge moved from Chicago, Illinois to Wallace, Idaho. She arrived in 1899 to provide photo touch-up work at T.N. Barnard's studio, eventually running the studio.

Stockbridge's subject included everyday subjects in Wallace such as townscapes and events, but she also photographed the local mines including portraits of miners and capturing mining disasters.

Her career spanned over 60 years. She was the oldest living member of the Zonta International club for advancement of women when she died in 1965.

== Works ==
=== Photographic books ===
Hart, Patricia; Nelson, Ivar (1993). Mining Town: The Photographic Record of T. N. Barnard and Nellie Stockbridge from the Coeur D'Alenes. University of Washington Press. ISBN 0-295-97254-8.
