= Wallace Historic District =

Historic district in Idaho, United States

- U.S. National Register of Historic Places
- U.S. Historic district
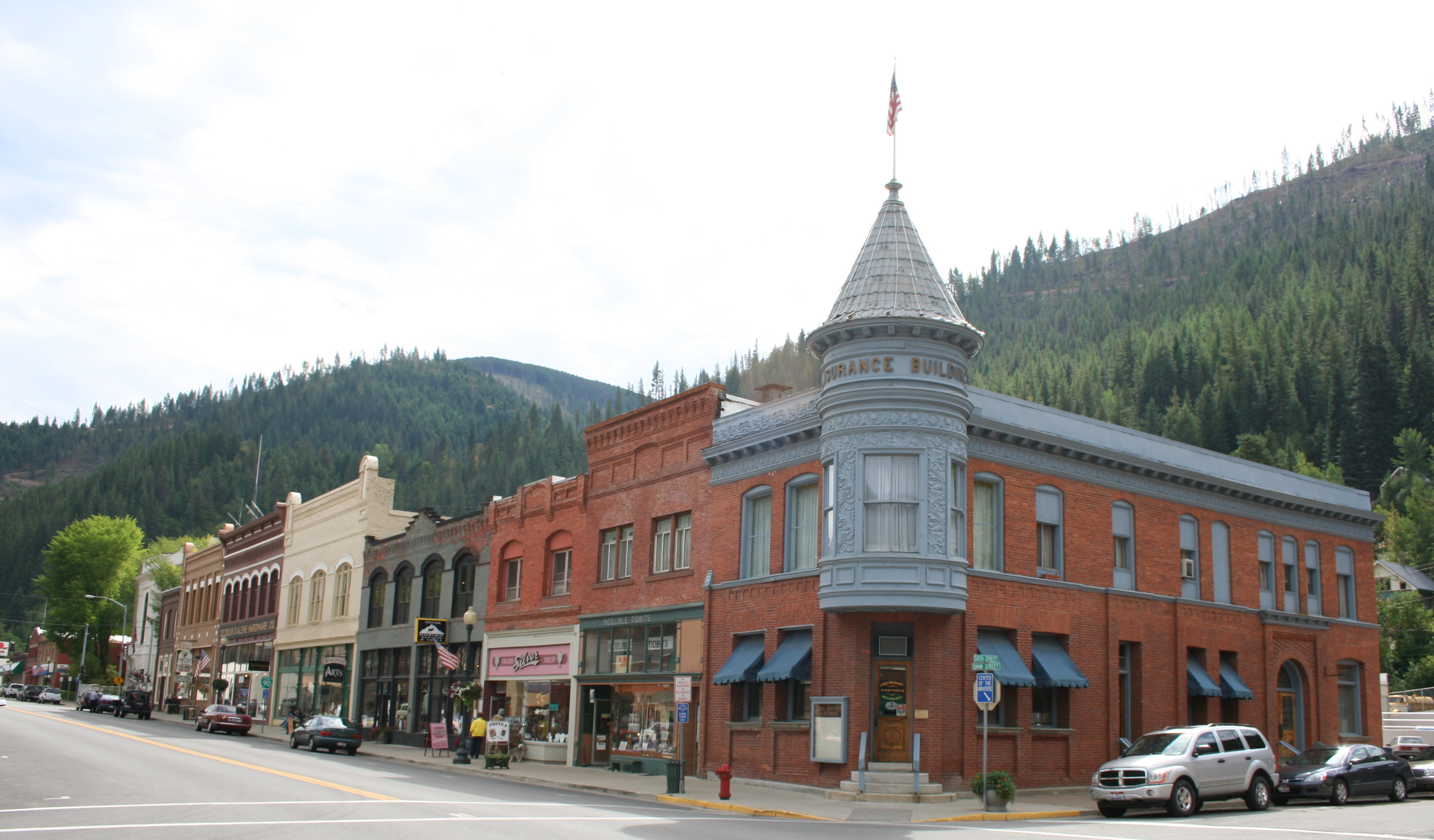

- Location within Idaho Location within the United States
- Location: Roughly bounded by Pine, Bank, 5th and 7th Sts., Wallace, Idaho
- Coordinates: 47.4723°N 115.9262°W
- Area: 8 acres (3.2 ha)
- Built: `1890-91
- Built by: Multiple
- Architectural style: Classical Revival, Renaissance Revival, and Late Victorian
- NRHP reference No.: 79000809
- Added to NRHP: August 10, 1979

The Wallace Historic District, which is roughly bounded by Oak, Silver, C, Mullan, Canyon, Fir, and 1st Sts. in Wallace in Shoshone County, Idaho, is a historic district. It was listed on the National Register of Historic Places in 1979. The listing was modified twice later. The Wallace Historic District was designated as part of a highway revolt to prevent Interstate 90 from being built and destroying the historic center of Wallace.

The original listing was an 8 acres (3.2 ha) area roughly bounded by Pine, Bank, 5th and 7th Sts. It included 485 contributing buildings, many built during 1890–91. It included Classical Revival, Renaissance Revival, and Late Victorian and vernacular architecture.

- Wallace Historic District (Boundary Increase)
- U.S. National Register of Historic Places
- U.S. Historic district
- Location within Idaho Location within the United States
- Location: Roughly bounded by Oak, Silver, C, Mullan, Canyon, Fir, and 1st Sts., Wallace, Idaho
- Area: 100 acres (40 ha)
- Built: 1890
- Built by: Multiple; PWA
- Architectural style: Colonial Revival, Mixed (more Than 2 Styles From Different Periods), Bungalow/Craftsman
- NRHP reference No.: 83000289
- Added to NRHP: September 1, 1983

The Wallace Historic District was modified by a Boundary Increase listing in 1983. The modified district includes about 500 residences, plus the Carnegie library (separately listed as Wallace Carnegie Library) and other non-residential buildings in Wallace.

The 100 acres (40 ha) increase included 301 contributing buildings.

There was also a boundary decrease, with refnum 90000360, of March 14, 1990.
