= John C. Feehan House =

- U.S. National Register of Historic Places

- Location within Idaho
- Location: Main St., Murray, Idaho
- Coordinates: 47°37′36″N 115°51′05″W
- Area: less than one acre
- Built: 1891
- Built by: John C. Feehan
- Architectural style: Greek Revival
- NRHP reference No.: 80001334
- Added to NRHP: August 27, 1980

The John C. Feehan House, on Main St. in Murray, Idaho, was built in 1891. It was listed on the National Register of Historic Places in 1980.

It is a one-story hewn log building with some aspect of Greek Revival style.
