= Employer Support of the Guard and Reserve =

United States government agency

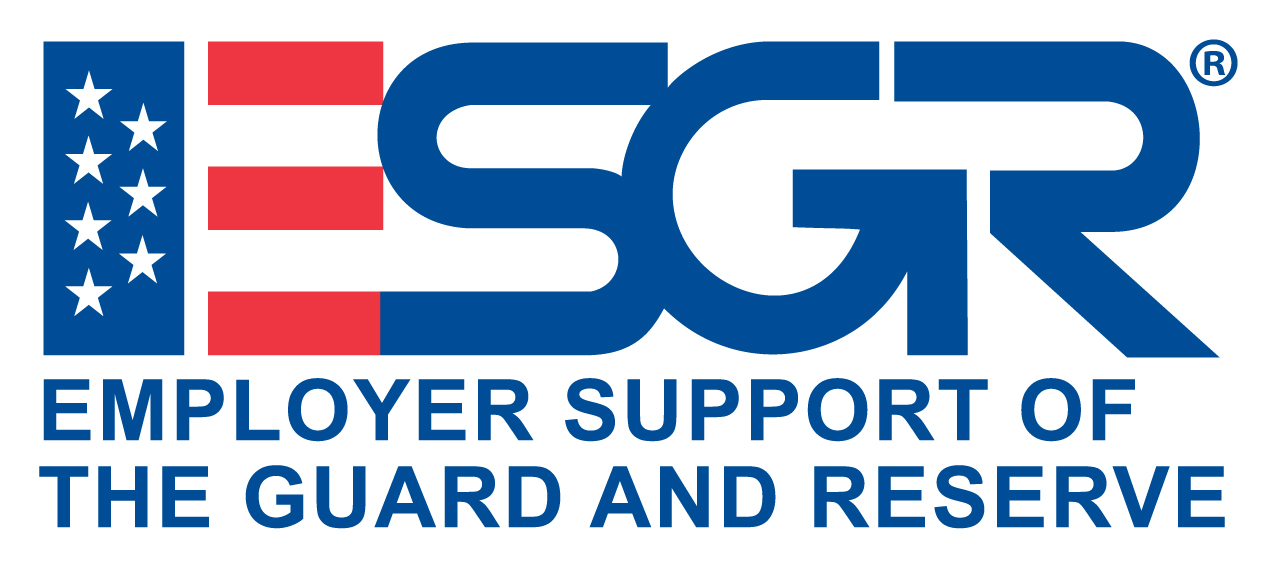

Agency overview
- Formed: 1972
- Jurisdiction: Federal government of the United States
- Headquarters: Washington, D.C.
- Parent department: United States Department of Defense
- Website: www.esgr.mil

Employer Support of the Guard and Reserve (ESGR) is the lead U.S. Defense Department program promoting cooperation and understanding between civilian employers and their National Guard and Reserve employees. Established in 1972, ESGR operates within the Defense Human Resources Activity. ESGR develops and promotes supportive work environments for service members in the Reserve Components through outreach, recognition, and educational opportunities that increase awareness of applicable laws and resolves employer conflicts between the service members and their employers.

== Statement of Support ==
The Statement of Support program is the cornerstone of ESGR's efforts to gain and maintain employer support. The program aims to develop employers into advocates for employee participation in the military. Supportive employers are critical to maintaining the strength and readiness of the nation's Guard and Reserve units. Employers signing a statement of support pledge that:

1. To recognize, honor and enforce the Uniformed Services Employment and Reemployment Rights Act (USERRA);
2. To provide managers and supervisors with the tools they need to effectively manage those employees who serve in the Guard and Reserve;
3. Appreciate the values, leadership and unique skills service members bring to the workforce and will encourage opportunities to employ Guardsmen, Reservists, and Veterans;
4. To continually recognize and support service members and their families in peace, crisis and war.

The chairman of the Board of General Motors signed the first Statement of Support on December 13, 1972. Since then, thousands of employers—ranging from Chrysler to the Commonwealth of Massachusetts to the Choctaw Nation of Oklahoma—have followed suit, as did every cabinet secretary and federal agency in 2005.

== Awards ==
To recognize employers for policies and practices that facilitate employee participation in the Guard and Reserve, ESGR initiated the following awards:

- The Patriot Award honors supervisors for their superior support of Guard and Reserve employees. Nominations must come from a Guard or Reserve member or a family member. Nominated employers receive a certificate of recognition and a lapel pin.
- The Spouse Patriot Award is for a spouse of a Reservist or Guardsman to thank their boss. Though not required by law, many employers voluntarily assist Guard and Reserve spouses who often share the challenges of military service. Childcare, managing the household, and work schedules often have to be adjusted when one spouse leaves to serve our country.
- The Seven Seals Award is the broadest and most inclusive award given by ESGR and is presented at the discretion of the State Chair or by ESGR senior leadership. The Seven Seals Award is in recognition of significant individual or organizational achievement, initiative, or support that promotes and supports the ESGR mission, to include the efforts of the more than 4,700 volunteers who carry out ESGR's mission across the Nation on a daily basis.
- The Above and Beyond Award, ESGR's second-level award, is selected and presented by ESGR field committees to recognize employers at the state level who have gone above and beyond the requirements of the Uniformed Service Employment and Reemployment Rights Act.
- The Pro Patria award recognizes leadership practices and personnel policies that provide the greatest support to Guard and Reserve employees. Each ESGR field committee presents the award to one small, one large, and one public-sector employer in each committee's state or territory.
- The Extraordinary Employer Support Award was created to recognize sustained employer support of the National Guard and Reserve Service. Only prior recipients of the Secretary of Defense Employer Support Freedom Award or the Pro-Patria Award, who have demonstrated sustained support for three years after receiving one of those awards, are eligible for consideration at the committee level. Subsequent awards can be given in three-year increments from the initial award.
- The Secretary of Defense Employer Support Freedom Award is the highest recognition given by the U.S. government to employers for their outstanding support of Guard and Reserve employees. Fifteen awards are presented annually to small, large, and public sector employers, who are further recognized in meetings with a senior governmental official, including the President, Vice President, Secretary of Defense, or member of Congress.

== Ombudsman Services Program ==
ESGR's primary means for mediating workplace conflict is its Ombudsman Services Program. This national network consists of more than 900 volunteers within 54 field committees throughout the United States, Guam, Puerto Rico and the Virgin Islands.

While each ombudsman receives extensive training on USERRA and dispute-resolution techniques, ombudsmen do not offer legal counsel or advice. Instead, they serve as an informal, neutral and free resource. In FY2013, ESGR ombudsmen successfully mediated 78 percent of their 2,554 cases.

If an ESGR ombudsman is unable to facilitate a resolution, parties have the option to seek private counsel and/or a formal investigation through the Department of Labor's Veterans' Employment and Training Service, the Office of Special Counsel, or the Department of Justice.

Employers or service members who have a question can reach an ESGR ombudsmen in the ESGR National Call Center M-F, 8am-6pm ET at 1-800-336-4590.

== See also ==
- Veterans' Employment and Training Service
