= Wallace Carnegie Library =

- U.S. National Register of Historic Places
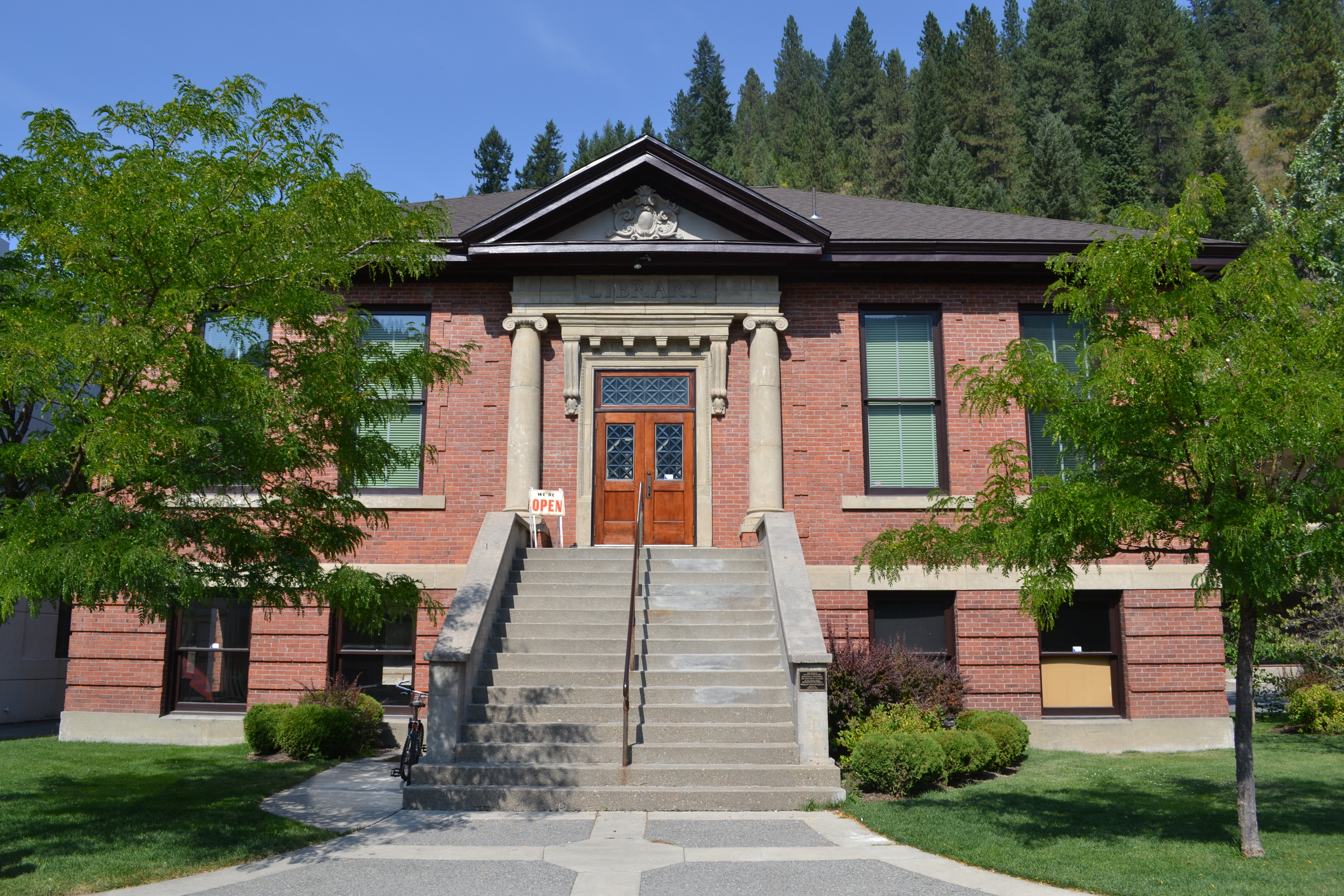

- Location within Idaho Location within the United States
- Location: City Park, Wallace, Idaho
- Coordinates: 47°28′27″N 115°55′34″W
- Area: less than one acre
- Built: 1911
- Architectural style: Renaissance, English Renaissance
- NRHP reference No.: 81000209
- Added to NRHP: February 3, 1981

The Wallace Carnegie Library, in Wallace, Idaho, was built in 1911. It was listed on the National Register of Historic Places in 1981.

It is located at 415 River St. adjacent to a small city park.

It is a one-story brick Carnegie library built upon a high basement in English Renaissance Revival style. Its entrance is through a portico with Ionic columns at the top of a flight of concrete steps.
