= Miner's Hat =

Novelty building in Kellogg, Idaho

- U.S. National Register of Historic Places
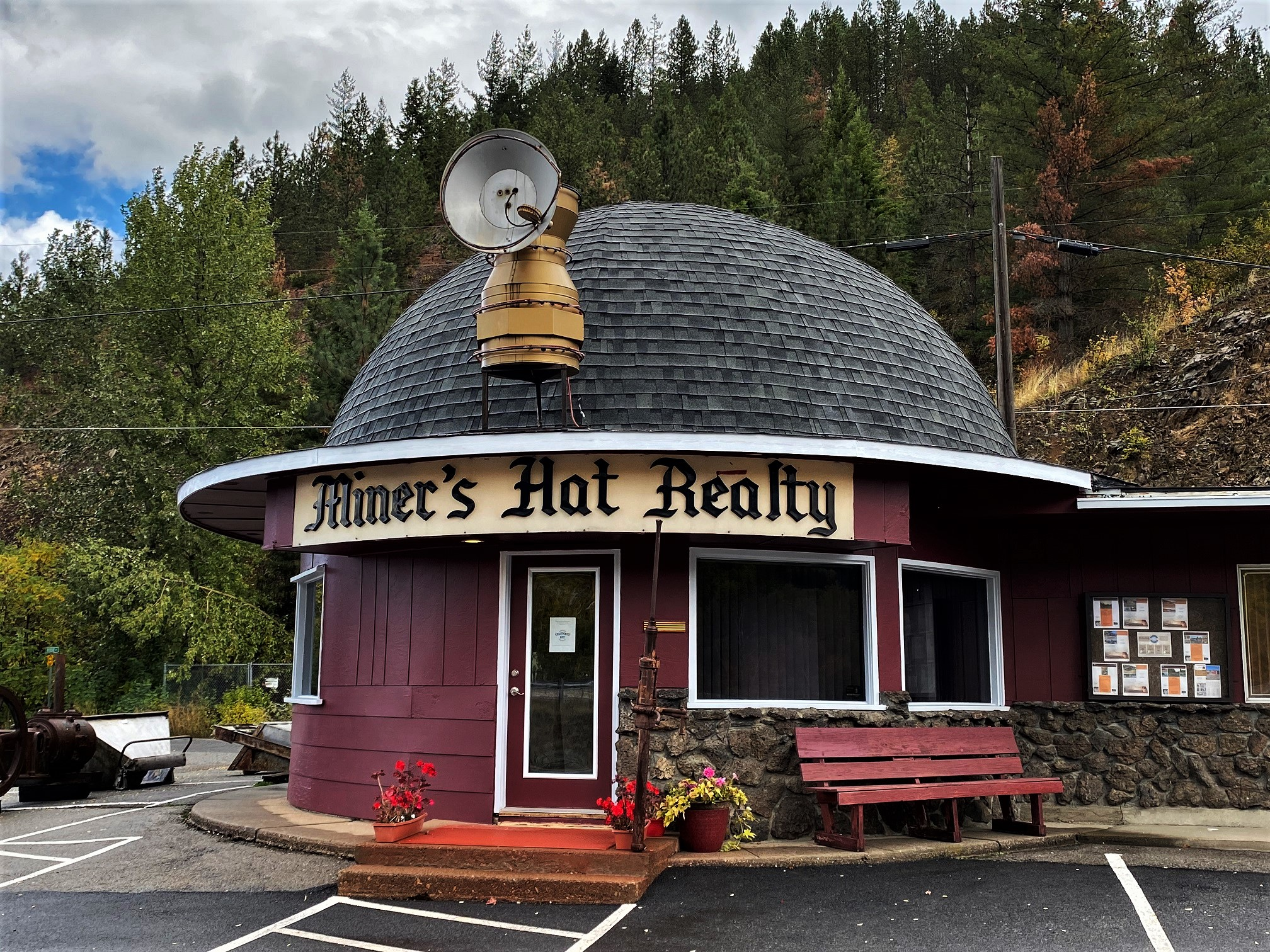

- Location within Idaho
- Location: 300 East Cameron Ave., Kellogg, Idaho
- Coordinates: 47.5362°N 116.1134°W
- Area: less than one acre
- Built: 1940
- NRHP reference No.: 100007007
- Added to NRHP: September 23, 2021

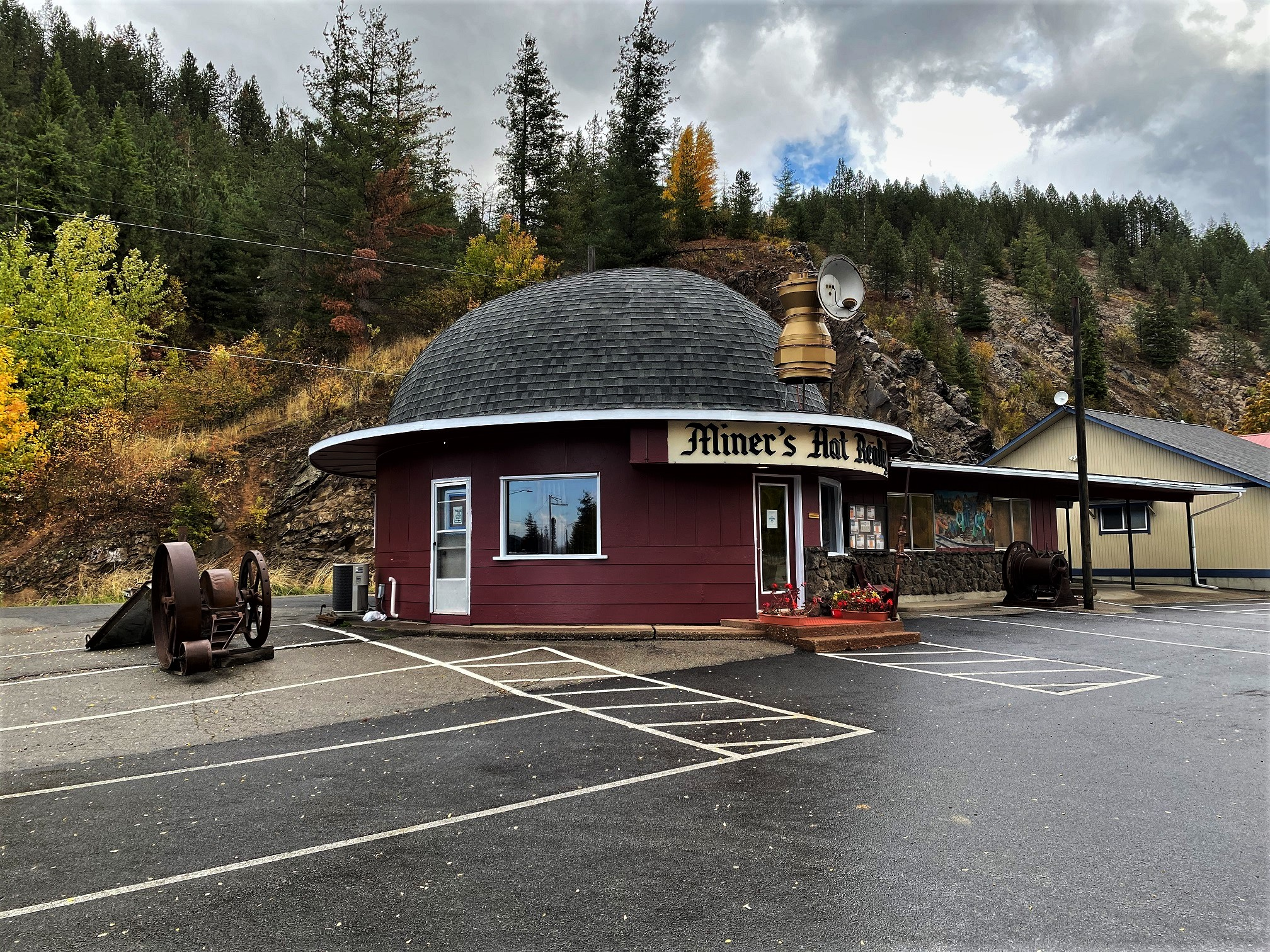
Miner's Hat, Shoshone County, ID

The Miner's Hat, is a novelty building located at 300 East Cameron Ave. in Kellogg, Idaho, that is designed in the shape of a hat, specifically a protective miner's helmet. It was listed on the National Register of Historic Places in 2021. Novelty buildings are architectural structures with unusual (and often whimsical) shapes. Examples include the Big Duck on Long Island, in New York State, and the Teapot Dome Service Station in Zillah, Washington.

== Description ==
The Miner's Hat was built in 1940 as a diner and drive-in restaurant located on East Cameron Ave, in Kellogg, Idaho in a mixed residential and commercial area. Local resident Mary Etta Page, and her two daughters had the structure custom-built for business use as a diner to serve locals, miners and travelers. It functioned as both a sit-down diner as well as a drive-in diner.

The building was constructed as a circular one story wood-frame building with a concrete block basement and a rectangular addition. The foundation is concrete slab. The main circular structural component is 20 feet in diameter with a domed roof, approximately 20 feet tall. A flat eave extends outwards from the lower portion of the domed roof forming a narrow "hat brim". A replica of a miner's carbide headlamp is constructed in steel and is attached to the main entrance of the building; the light in the headlamp is operational. The rectangular addition is 20x40 feet with a flat roof; there is a two-bay carport incorporated into the addition.

The original exterior was covered with wood clapboard siding and had two wood sash windows as well as partially glazed wooden doors. The original interior contained booths for diners that lined the circular walls.

In 1967 the building was sold to be used as a commercial office for Miner's Hat Realty.

It was nomitated for listing on the National Register of Historic Places in 2019 and was accepted and listed in 2021.

== Historical significance ==
The Miner's Hat is historically significant as a well-preserved example of roadside novelty architecture, "the building retains its association with the adjacent roadway and its auto-centric setting". The workmanship, and overall design of the structure has been retained over the years. Although the structure has lost some of its physical integrity, it has "sufficient integrity to convey its significance as a unique example of programmatic roadside architecture." The NRHP application states that: "The Miner's Hat is locally significant under Criterion C as a unique example of programmatic, or mimetic, roadside architecture."

== Novelty architecture as a form of programmatic architecture ==
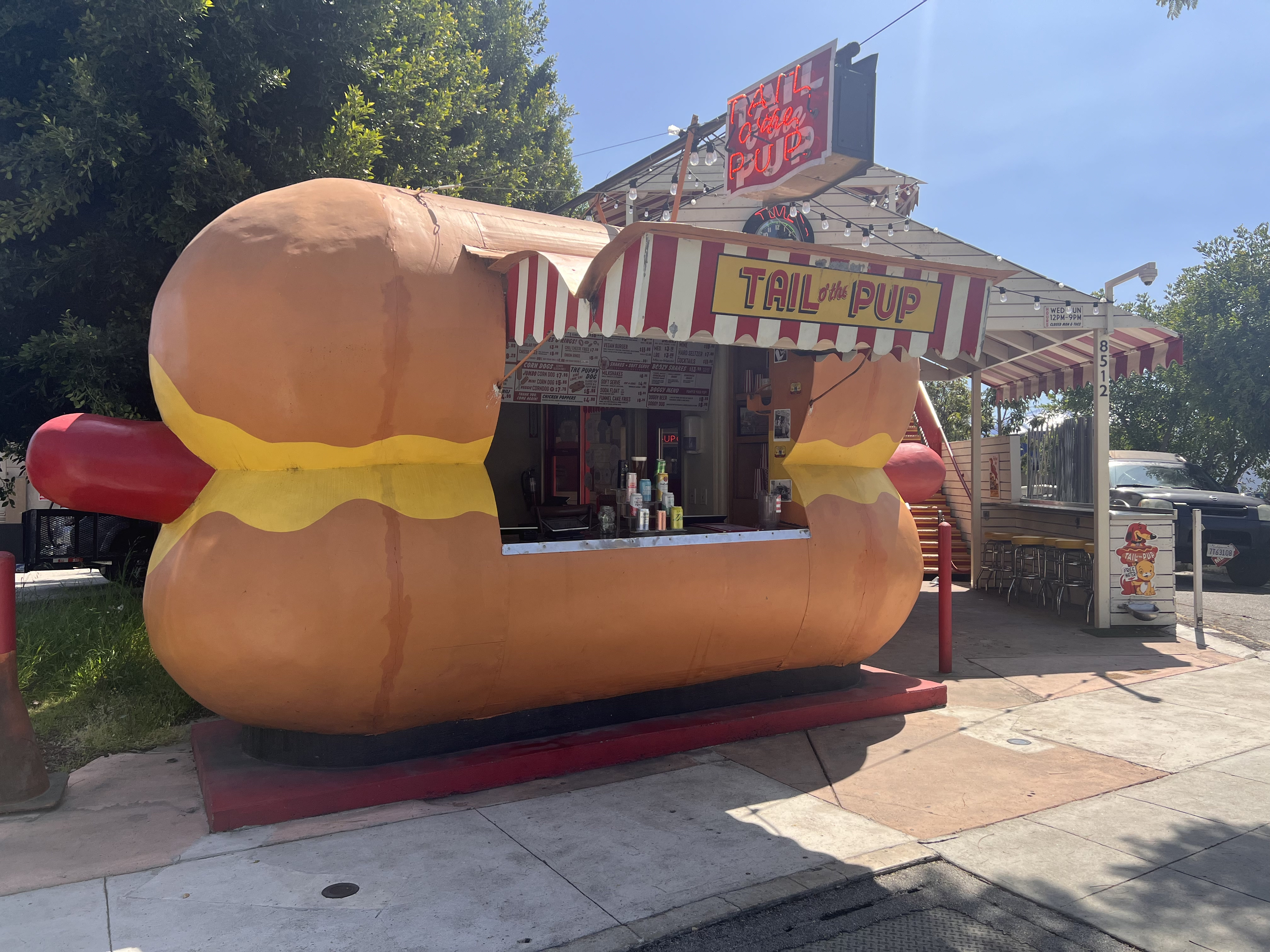
Tail o' the Pup, hotdog stand in Los Angeles; an example of programmatic architecture

The term "programmatic architecture" was coined by architectural historian David Gebhard to describe a type of building with a sculptural structural form to convey its use or contents. One well-known example in the United States is the 1931 building The Big Duck, in Flanders, New York. The purpose of the building was to sell ducks and eggs. "The Big Duck became a symbol for programmatic architecture after architects Robert Venturi, Denise Scott-Brown and Steven Izenour used "duck" as a catchall term for buildings whose form expresses its function, as opposed to a "decorated shed" in their 1972 book, Learning from Las Vegas." Some consider novelty architecture and programmatic architecture as a gimmicky, kitsch genre of mid-century American buildings, but its historical roots extend back to the 17th and 18th-century England and Europe.
