= Boise Fire Department =

Boise, Idaho Fire Department

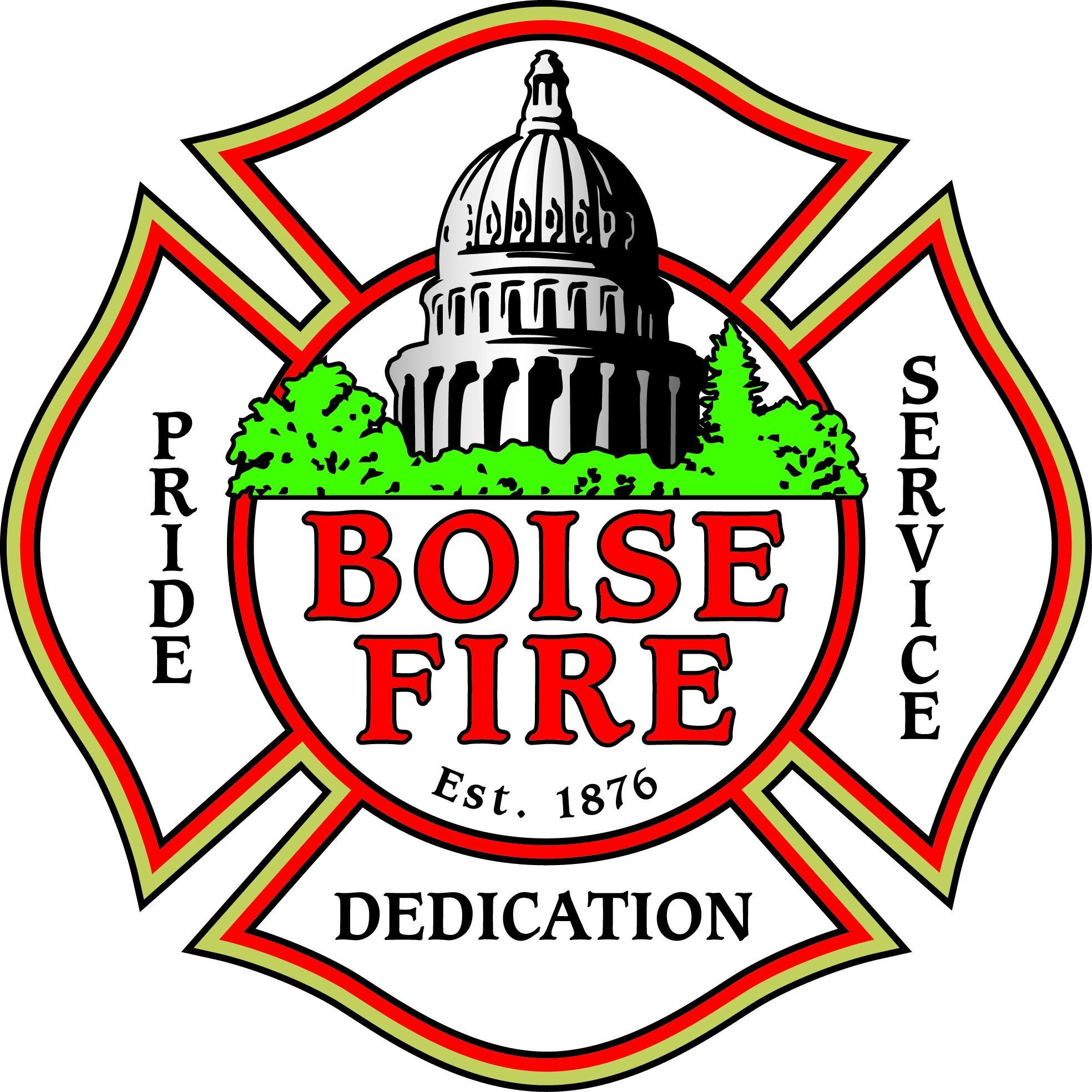

Operational area
- Country: United States
- State: Idaho
- County: Ada
- City: Boise

Agency overview
- Established: January 24, 1876
- Annual calls: 19,400+ (2021)
- Employees: 267 (2021)
- Annual budget: $59,523,387 (2021)
- Staffing: Career
- Fire chief: Aaron Hummel (2025)
- EMS level: ALS & BLS
- IAFF: 149
- Motto: "Pride, Dedication, Service"

Facilities and equipment
- Divisions: 4
- Battalions: 3 (9 Battalion Chiefs)
- Stations: 19
- Engines: 16
- Trucks: 3
- Tenders: 2
- HAZMAT: 2
- USAR: 2
- Airport crash: 6
- Wildland: 8

Website
- Official website
- IAFF website

The Boise Fire Department (Commonly called Boise Fire) is the agency that provides fire suppression services within the city of Boise, Idaho and contract services to two fire districts in suburban Ada County including Garden City and Hidden Springs through Whitney Fire District and North Ada County Fire and Rescue. It is the largest fire department in Idaho. Emergency Medical Services (EMS) are provided by the separate county agency, Ada County Paramedics. Currently, Boise Fire Department has 300+ full time employees, 17 Fire Stations, a Hazardous Materials Team, ARFF team, Dive Team and a Technical Rescue Team. The Department serves a population of 236,000 residents in 130+ square miles.

== History ==
Boise's first fire department was created on January 24, 1876; consisting of 28 volunteers. Engine Company #1 and Hook and Ladder Company #1 were housed in a converted blacksmith shop at 619 Main St., a one-story wood building which, ironically, burned down on Sept. 23, 1883. In 1902, the city created a paid, professional fire department with a part-time chief, three drivers and "pay-per-call" stokers and firefighters. The 1940's population growth led to a large expansion. The 1950's saw the introduction of radios and the dispatch office, but also saw a number of major downtown structure fires. The 1960's saw a staff of 107 firefighters with a call volume exceeding 1,000 alarms for the first time. The airport also needed specific Aircraft Rescue and Fire Fighting (ARFF) equipment, and another station was built on-site in 1965. The 1970's saw 14 new pieces of equipment and vehicles purchased. With Boise's population reaching 102,000 in 1980, the department could not keep up. In 1982, over $2.46 million was lost due to an arson spree. And by 1989, the call volume was exceeding 7,000 call annually. The 1990's saw new construction, and upgraded training facility and grew to 15 stations by 1998.

Their first female captain was promoted in 2019.

== Organization ==
The department has four (4) divisions as well as a Pipe and Drum corp and an Honor Guard.

=== Bureaus ===
- Emergency Services
- Support Services
- Planning and Administration
- Bureau of Fire Prevention

== Operations ==
=== Fire Station Locations and Apparatus (2021) ===
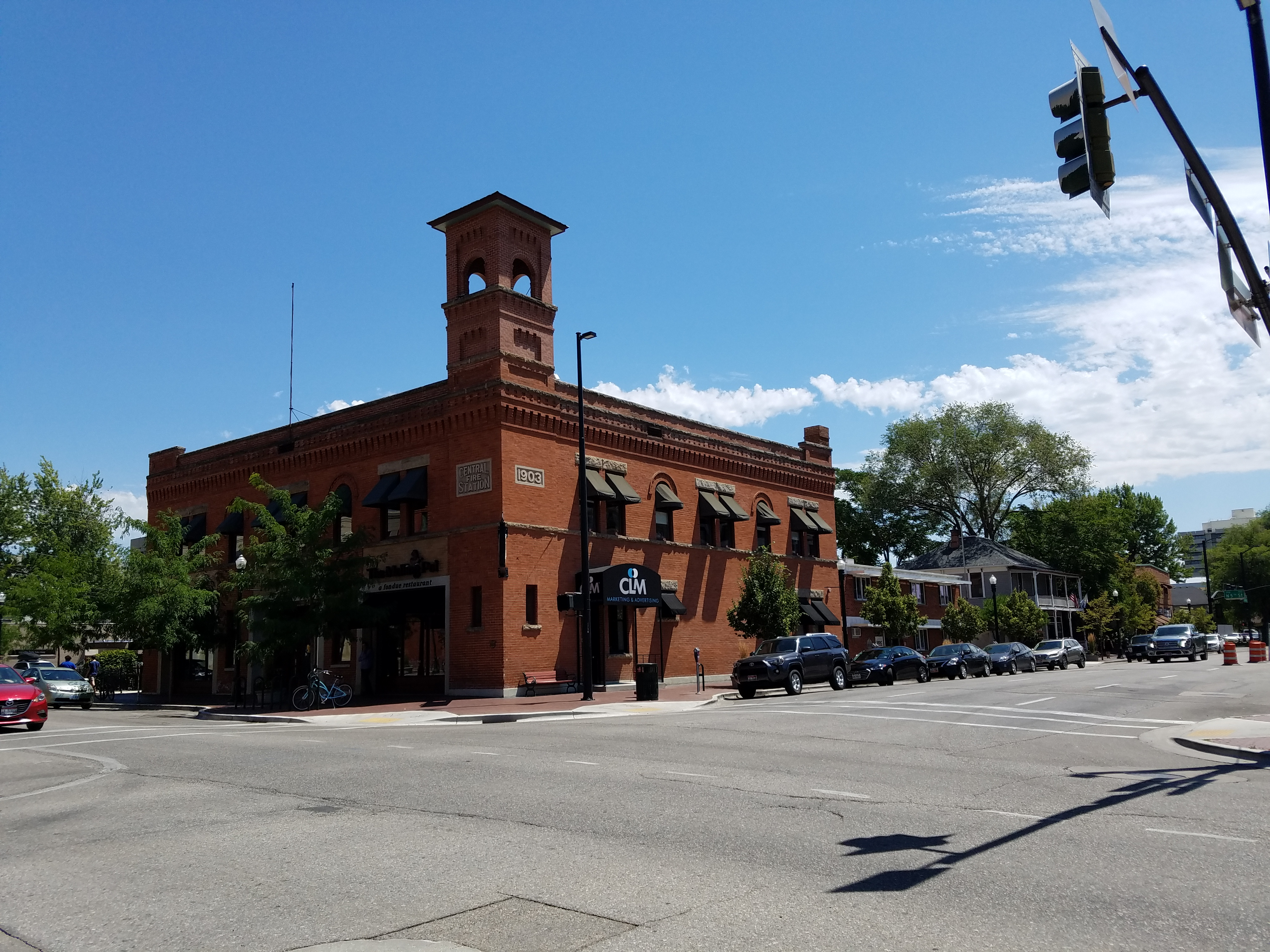
Central Fire Station (1903) in Boise, Idaho, is part of the Boise Historic District.

The BFD firefighting operations are based out of the city's 17 local fire stations.

	Address	Engine Companies or other units	EMS Units*	Truck Companies	Date	Other
1	707 Reserve Street	Engine 1, Dive 1, Brush 1			1892	Foothills Rescue unit & Battalion #1
2	3551 Cartwright Road	Engine 2, Brush 2			1906	
3	2202 Gekeler Lane	Engine 3, Dive 3	Medic 13		1912	Original engine "Old 13" is fully restored.
4	8485 Ustick Road	Engine 4		Truck 4	1950	Battalion #2, Reserve Battalion Vehicle
5	212 S. 16th Street	Engine 5, Squad 5		Ladder 5	1906	Was Fully remodeled/replaced in 2025. Squad 5 is to be set into service sometime soon.
6	6933 Franklin Road	Engine 6, Foam unit, Multiple Reserve Units				
7	1666 Commerce Street	Engine 7, Rescue 7, Squad 7		Truck 7	2003	100=-foot Rear-mount Tower-Ladder
8	3575 W. Overland Road	Engine 8	Medic 18		1956	
9	3101 Sycamore	Engine 9, Brush 9			1975	
10	12065 West McMillan	Engine 10	Medic 28		1994	
11	10895 Emerald	Engine 11			1979	
13	6124 Bogart	Engine 13, Brush 13		2025	Fully Electric Station. Built after the Goose Fire in 2021	
12	3240 State Highway 21	Engine 12, Brush 12, Water Tender 12			1998	
14	2515 S. Five Mile Rd	Engine 14, Water Tender 14, Brush 14, Hazmat 14			2007	Replaced #21.Whitney Fire District, Ada County Sheriff sub-station
15	3676 E. Warm Springs Ave	Engine 15, Brush 15			2013	Replaced Station#22
16	5800 Glenwood St	Engine 16, Water Tender 16, Brush 16			1967	
17	3801 S. Cole Road	Engine 17, Haz-Mat 17			2010	Battalion #3
18	3895 Chinden Boulevard		Medic 22		1979	(inactive)Recruit Academy Training
19 ARFF	2855 Lockheed Lane	ARFF Smokey 7, 9, 10			1965	Boise Airport. Both ARFF trucks were replaced in 2025
20	5871 Hidden Springs Drive				1999	Jointly operated with Eagle (Idaho) fire Department

^{*} EMS Services supplied by Ada County Paramedics

== See also ==
- South Boise Fire Station
- National Interagency Fire Center
