= Murray, Idaho =

Unincorporated community in the state of Idaho, United States

- Unincorporated community
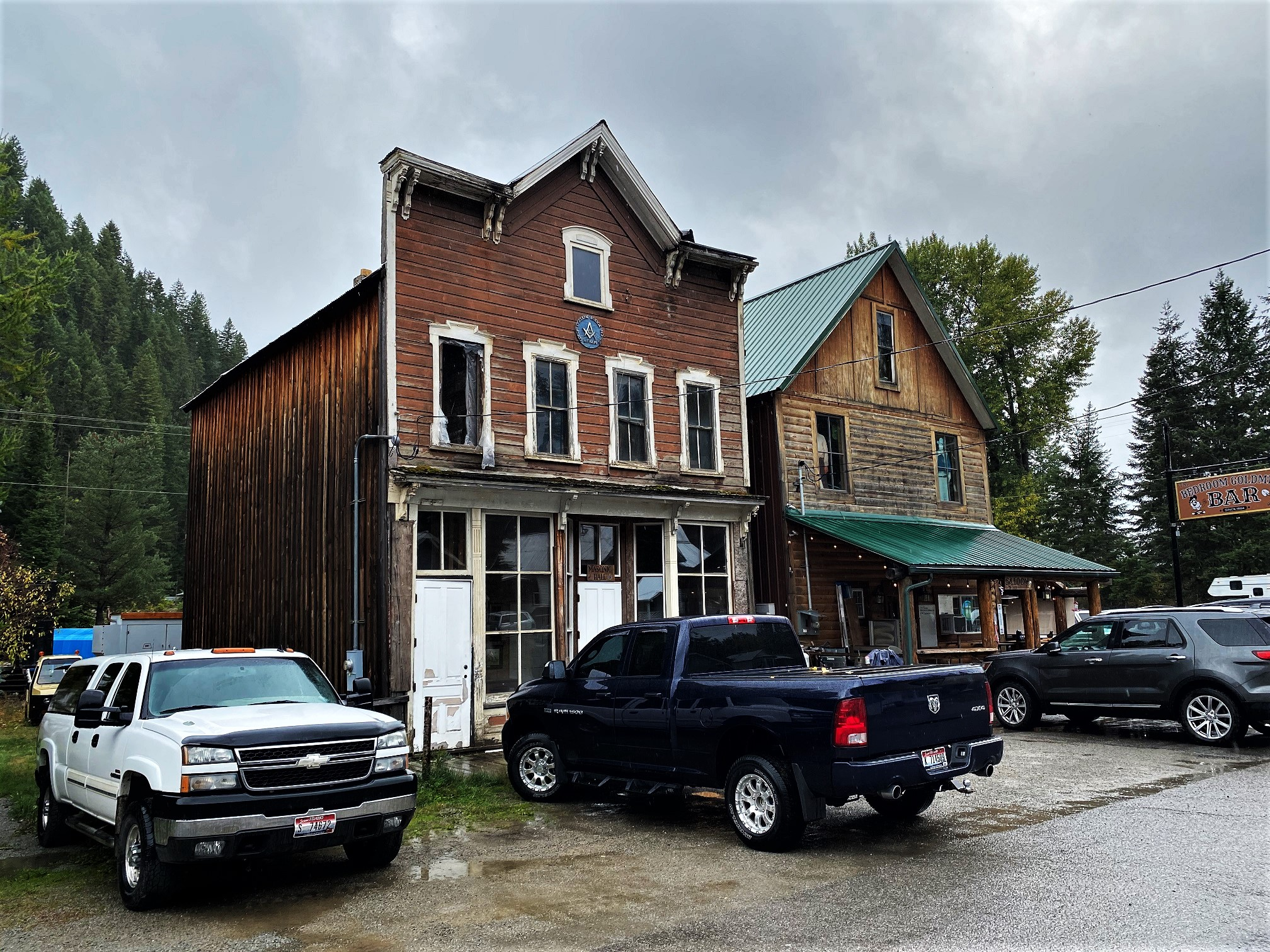
- Murray Masonic Hall in 2021

- Location within the United States Location within Idaho
- Coordinates: 47°37′38″N 115°51′31″W
- Country: United States
- State: Idaho
- County: Shoshone
- Elevation: 2,772 ft (845 m)
- Time zone: UTC-8 (Pacific (PST))
  - Summer (DST): UTC-7 (PDT)
- ZIP code: 83874
- Area codes: 208, 986
- GNIS feature ID: 396938

Murray is an unincorporated community in the northwest United States, located in Shoshone County, Idaho. It is approximately twenty miles (32 km) north of Wallace along Dobson Pass Road. Prichard Creek flows through the community, forming a thin and deep valley in the surrounding Coeur d'Alene Mountains.

== History ==
The community was named for George Murray, a mining prospector. Murray was one of several boisterous mining camps that became active in the late 1880s in northern Idaho, and mines operated in the area from the 1880s to the 1950s. In 1884, a judge fined Wyatt Earp $65 for claim jumping after he forced William Payne off his land at gunpoint near Murray.

There was never a Northern Pacific line serving Murray. The line was built by the Idaho Northern Railroad in 1908. The Idaho Northern was taken over by the Oregon–Washington Railroad and Navigation Company (OWR & N) on March 1, 1911. It served as a branch line from Enaville until the 1933 flood washed out much of the line., and it was then abandoned. A Northern Pacific railroad line served the community for two years during the 1910s.

A post office was established at Murray in 1884, and remained in operation until 1959. When roads was rebuilt over the dredge spoils in 1997 - 1998, many gold nuggets were found.

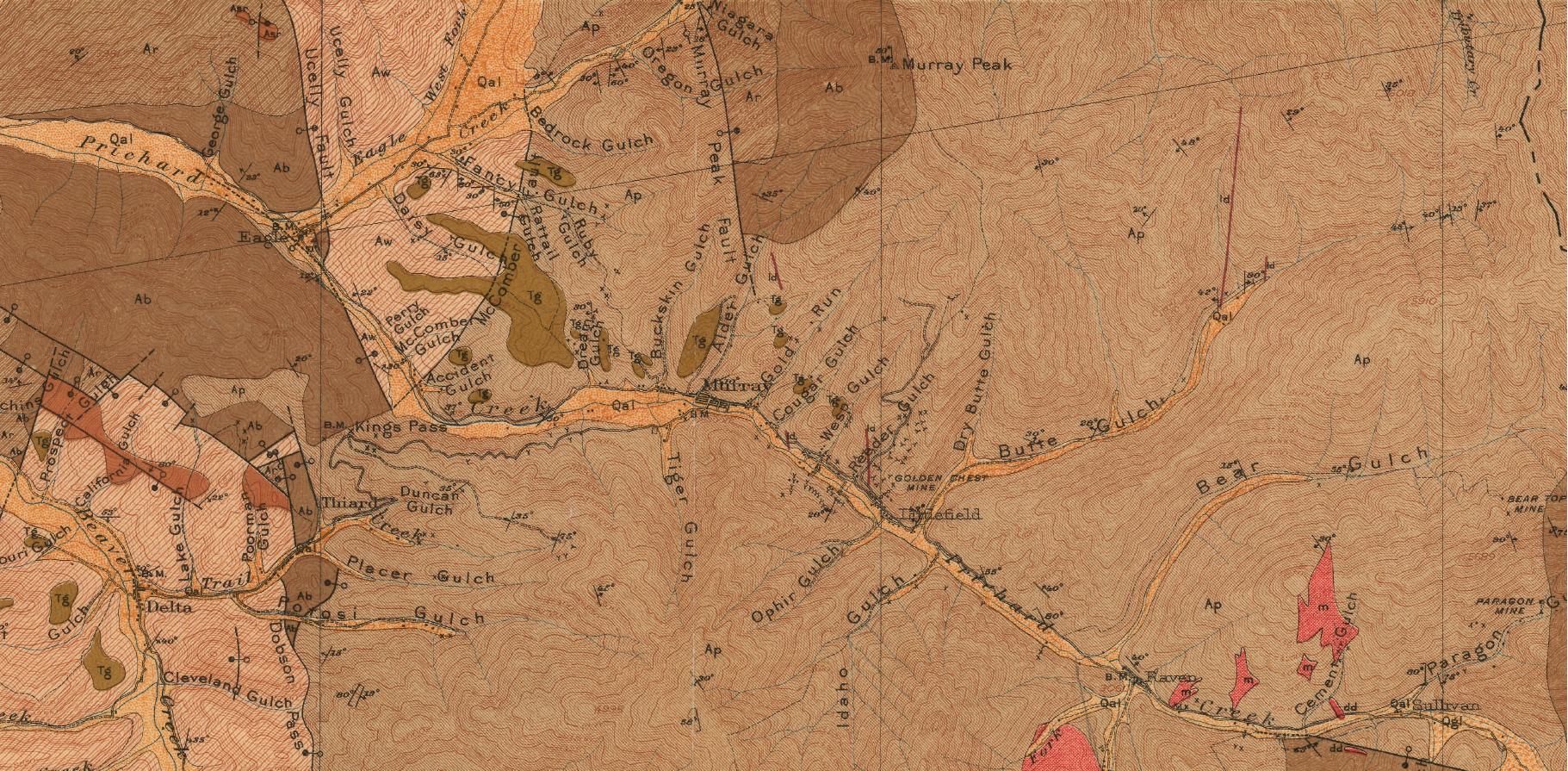
1907 geological map of Murray, including the locations of the Golden Chest, Bear Top and Paragon mines

Murray's population was estimated at 500 in 1909, and was estimated at 100 in 1960. As of 2024, the population is about 25.

== Notable person ==
The chemist and biochemist John D. Ferry (1912–2002) attended a one-room school in Murray.

== Today ==
Two businesses remain open, the Sprag Pole Restaurant and Museum and the Bedroom Goldmine Bar. The Sprag Pole occupies one of the town's original buildings, built in 1884.
