= Bullion Tunnel =

- U.S. National Register of Historic Places
- Location within Idaho Location within the United States
- Location: East of Avery, Idaho
- Coordinates: 47°24′4″N 115°42′4″W
- Area: 2.5 acres (1.0 ha)
- Built: 1910
- MPS: North Idaho 1910 Fire Sites TR
- NRHP reference No.: 84001160
- Added to NRHP: September 20, 1984

The Bullion Tunnel, located east of Avery, Idaho was listed on the National Register of Historic Places in 1984.

It protected about 50 fire fighters from death in the 1910 North Idaho fire.
