= Wallace, Idaho =

- City
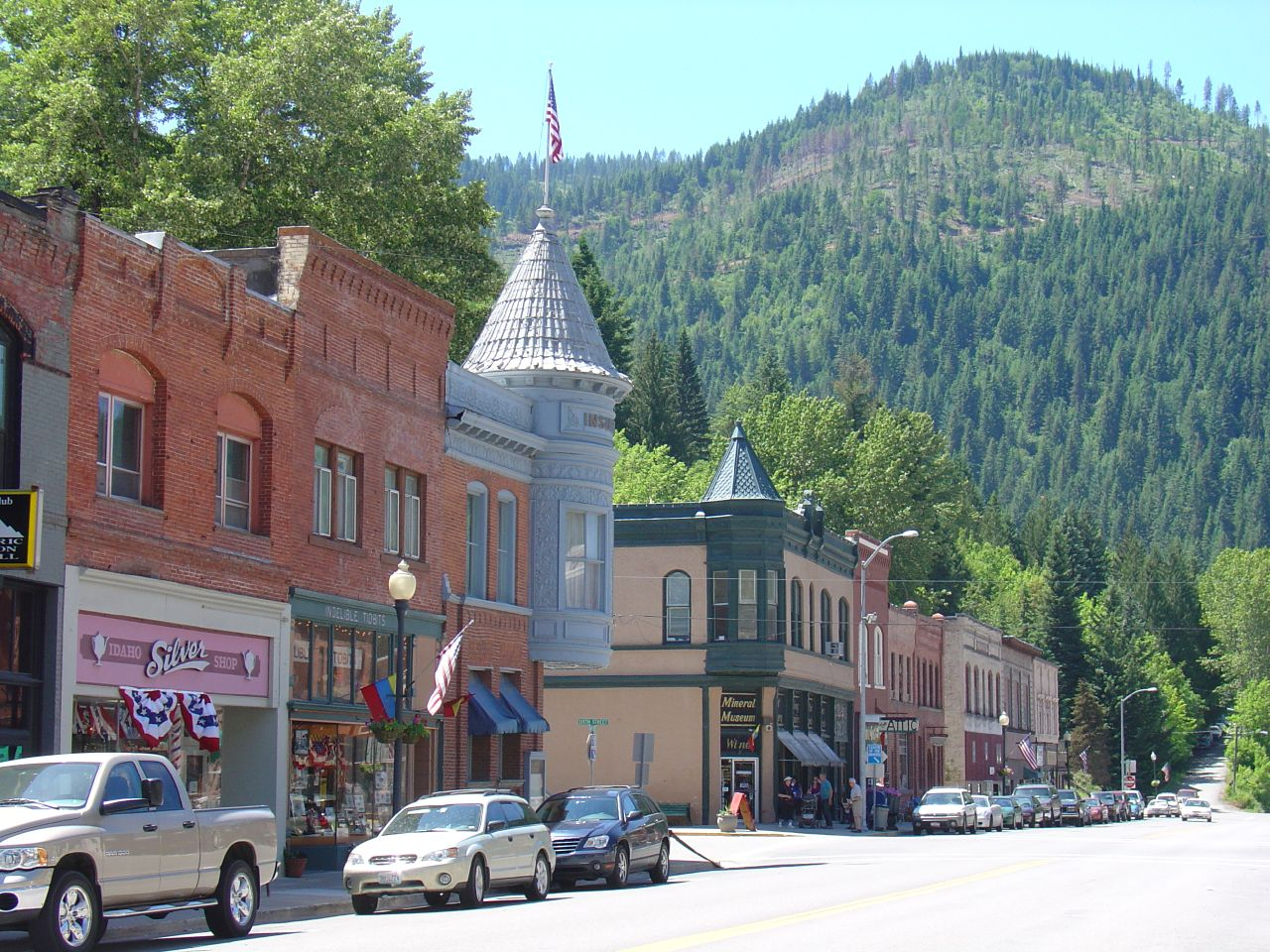
- Buildings in Wallace's historic district
- Nickname: Silver Capital of the World
- Location of Wallace in Shoshone County, Idaho.

- Location in the United States
- Coordinates: 47°28′25″N 115°55′21″W
- Country: United States
- State: Idaho
- County: Shoshone
- Founded: 1884

Area
  - Total: 0.91 sq mi (2.35 km^{2})
  - Land: 0.91 sq mi (2.35 km^{2})
  - Water: 0 sq mi (0.00 km^{2})
- Elevation: 2,854 ft (870 m)

Population (2020)
  - Total: 791
  - Density: 860.9/sq mi (332.38/km^{2})
- Time zone: UTC−8 (Pacific (PST))
  - Summer (DST): UTC−7 (PDT)
- ZIP codes: 83873-83874
- Area codes: 208, 986
- FIPS code: 16-84790
- GNIS feature ID: 2412169
- Website: wallace.id.gov

Wallace is a city in and the county seat of Shoshone County, Idaho, in the Silver Valley mining district of the Idaho Panhandle. Founded in 1884, Wallace sits alongside the South Fork of the Coeur d'Alene River (and Interstate 90). The town's population was 791 at the 2020 census.

The Trail of the Coeur d'Alenes rail trail passes through Wallace.

== History ==
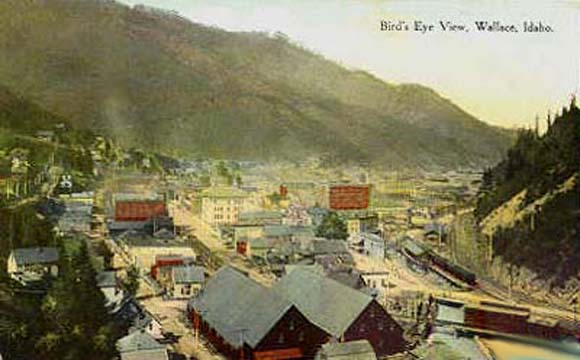
Depiction of Wallace c. 1900

=== Founding and early years ===
In the spring of 1884, Colonel William R. Wallace built a cabin at a site he called "Placer Center". A Civil War veteran, Wallace was heavily involved in mining ventures after the war. The spot's central location in the mining district clearly offered promise as a town site. In fact, a news sheet published at the time extolled the town's favorable prospects because "it is on the Mullan Road, which is the main emigrant road on the Bitter Root divide." Wallace believed in his new venture and invested money to build access roads, put up lot fences and made other improvements. By the spring of 1885, Placer Center had a grocery store and several other small businesses. Within a year or so, there was also a general store, a sawmill, hotel and more.

Wallace and Richard Lockey bought "Sioux half-breed scrip" from a bank in Spokane, Washington to purchase an 80-acre (32 ha) town site that would become the town of Wallace. Such scrip entitled the holder to "locate" (claim) unoccupied and unsurveyed public lands. Wallace's application for a land patent to secure title to the townsite was submitted to the United States General Land Office (GLO) in Coeur d'Alene on June 5, 1886.

The GLO head office in Washington, D.C. found that his scrip had been reported lost by its original holder. That original scrip had then been replaced and used to claim land, around six years earlier. For this reason, the GLO denied Wallace's application, in a letter dated February 3, 1887. Nevertheless, Col. Wallace and his Wallace Townsite Company continued to sell properties (lots) because the Coeur d'Alene land officer had advised them that they could do so. In fact, the officer said he would act as Wallace's attorney if a dispute arose. Neither the Company nor Col. Wallace informed potential or actual buyers that their patent on the townsite was uncertain.

The settlement flourished, and by the fall of 1887 when its first school was opened, there were many saloons, one brewery, a large apartment building with a public hall, a hotel, and many stores and shops. On September 10, 1887, a narrow gauge rail line reached Wallace, leading to further growth. Within two years the railroad would offer regular scheduled service. On May 2, 1888, a group of citizens petitioned Shoshone County's county commissioners for the town's incorporation, now to be called "Wallace", after the Colonel. Wallace was appointed one of the five trustees of the new town.

In November 1888, the townsite company engaged a Washington, D.C., attorney who specialized in contested public lands cases. The letter reporting this action does not say what event led to the move. However, it asserted that the original scrip owner had "made oath ... that he had never parted with the original, and never gave anyone power to use his name in any other location". That is, the company saw the reported GLO duplication of the scrip as a fraudulent action.

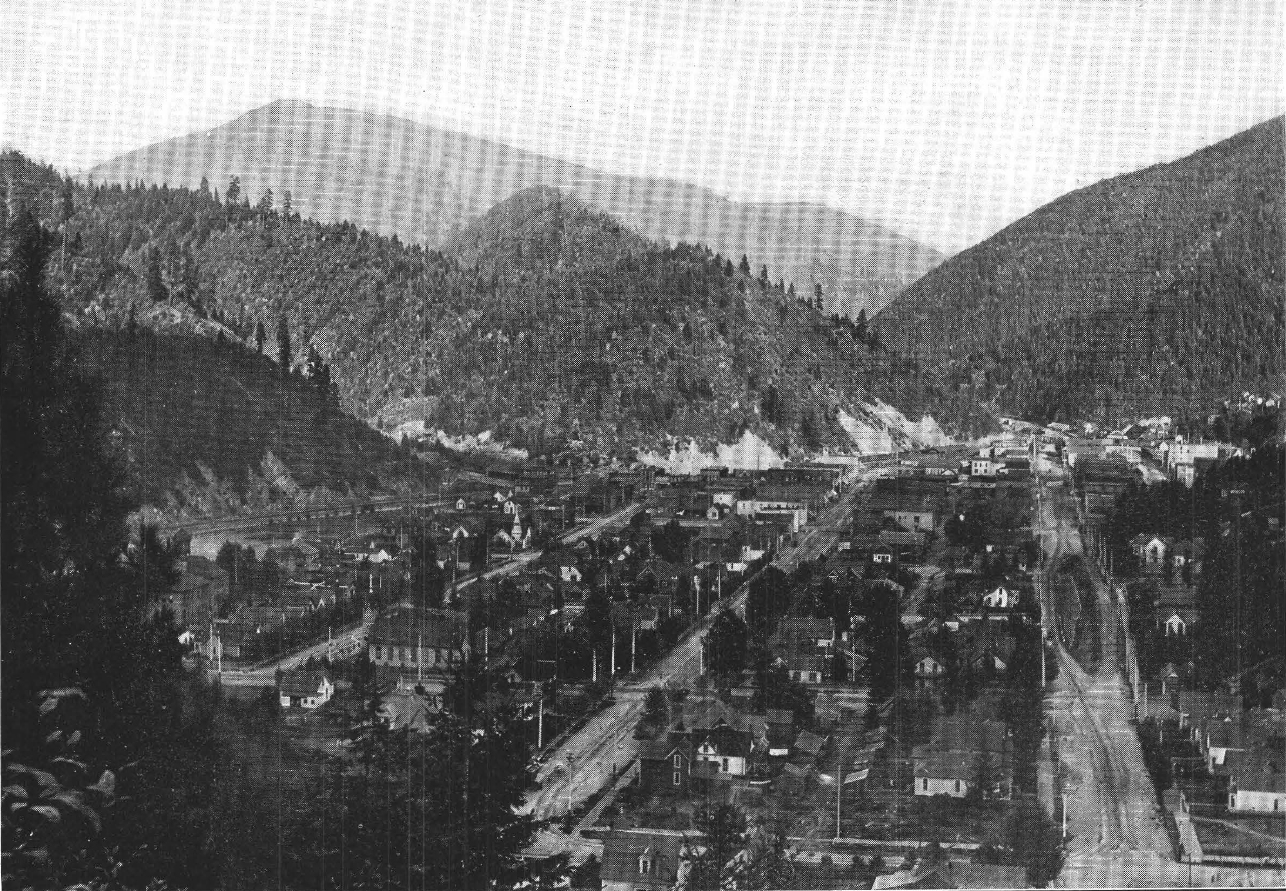
Wallace, 1904

But by February 19, 1889, reports had arrived in Wallace of a case involving disputed Sioux half-breed scrip. The Department of Interior (DOI) denied a Montana land claim because the scrip had been used for the benefit of persons other than the mixed-blood it had been issued to initially. This decision more closely followed the apparent intent of the original legislation, but was actually a reversal of long-standing GLO practice. For decades, the GLO had allowed land dealers to buy the scrip from the mixed-bloods for a pittance and then claim large expanses of valuable public land for white use. One group of speculators made substantial profits from at least 15,000 acres (6,070 ha) of land in Minnesota, Nevada and California. Newspaper reports suggested that this DOI decision might affect land claims in several places across the West.

In Wallace, the news of the case led many townspeople—on the night of Tuesday, February 19, 1889—to participate in "lot jumping," that is, peremptorily marking the space as their own. Newspapers across the United States carried news of the small western town's real estate upheaval. The New York Times wrote: "Many persons heretofore considered rich are no longer so, while poor persons have jumped into comfortable circumstances." Some existing owners guarded their own lots in order to retain their right of ownership. Local historian Judge Richard Magnuson wrote, "By 2 a.m., everything was located and the rush subsided."

William R. Wallace reacted to the jumping with an angry letter, partially quoted above to describe what the company considered improper action by the GLO. The letter closed, "The higher courts will ere long decide the validity of the claimants." With this letter and several others, Wallace took the stance of an aggrieved party in relation to the GLO's handling of the Sioux scrip. It has been documented that the under-staffed and poorly-run GLO was indeed involved in corrupt dealings at that time. Continuing their aggressive stance, the Wallace Townsite Company filed 13 legal suits, demanding $1,000 from citizens it claimed had illegally jumped their properties. Several years passed before all the disputes were fully resolved. Fortunately, land holders who had legitimately developed their plots were able to gain clear title. By the time the disputes were concluded, William R. Wallace had opened an office in Spokane to pursue mining ventures in the West.

In July 1890, a fire aided by strong winds destroyed thirteen saloons, six hotels, a bank, a theater, eighteen office structures (many doctors and lawyers, and the newspaper), three livery stables, and over thirty other stores and shops. A meeting hall, the telephone exchange, and the post office were also destroyed. Following the fire, the town organized a new, better-equipped fire company, installed an improved water system, and adopted ordinances requiring fireproof construction in certain downtown areas.

=== Labor strife, 1892 and 1899 ===
In 1892, mine owners in the Coeur d'Alenes found the usual investor pressure for profits exacerbated by increased railroad freight rates. Their subsequent measures to cut costs sparked a strike by the mine workers, so the operators brought in replacements. The pressure finally sparked the Coeur d'Alene, Idaho labor strike of 1892, which ended in a union victory. The immediate costs were three men dead on each side and the total destruction of the Frisco ore mill, about 4 miles (6.4 km) northeast of Wallace.

Unfortunately, the violence did not end there. An armed mob attacked the replacement workers as they waited for river transport out to Coeur d'Alene City. No evidence was found that the union leadership sanctioned this brutality, but reports to Idaho Governor Willey said that a dozen bullet-riddled bodies had been found. Martial law was declared and lasted about four months, but none of the charges brought by authorities were upheld.

A similar, although not nearly so deadly, confrontation occurred in April 1899. It again began among the miners working northeast of Wallace. However, the union's target was the Bunker Hill & Sullivan Mining Company, which adamantly refused to recognize or deal with the miners' union. A huge force took over and blew up the company's mill at Wardner. During the Coeur d'Alene, Idaho labor confrontation of 1899 attackers murdered a non-union miner and killed one of their own by "friendly fire".

Alarmed by the size of attacking force – perhaps as many as a thousand men – Governor Frank Steunenberg imposed martial law. About a thousand men were rounded up and held in a crude prison, dubbed "the bullpen". But in the end, only one union man was convicted of a crime, and he was pardoned and released two years later. But, again, there was a tragic aftermath. In 1905, union assassin Harry Orchard murdered ex-Governor Steunenberg.

=== Wallace grows ===
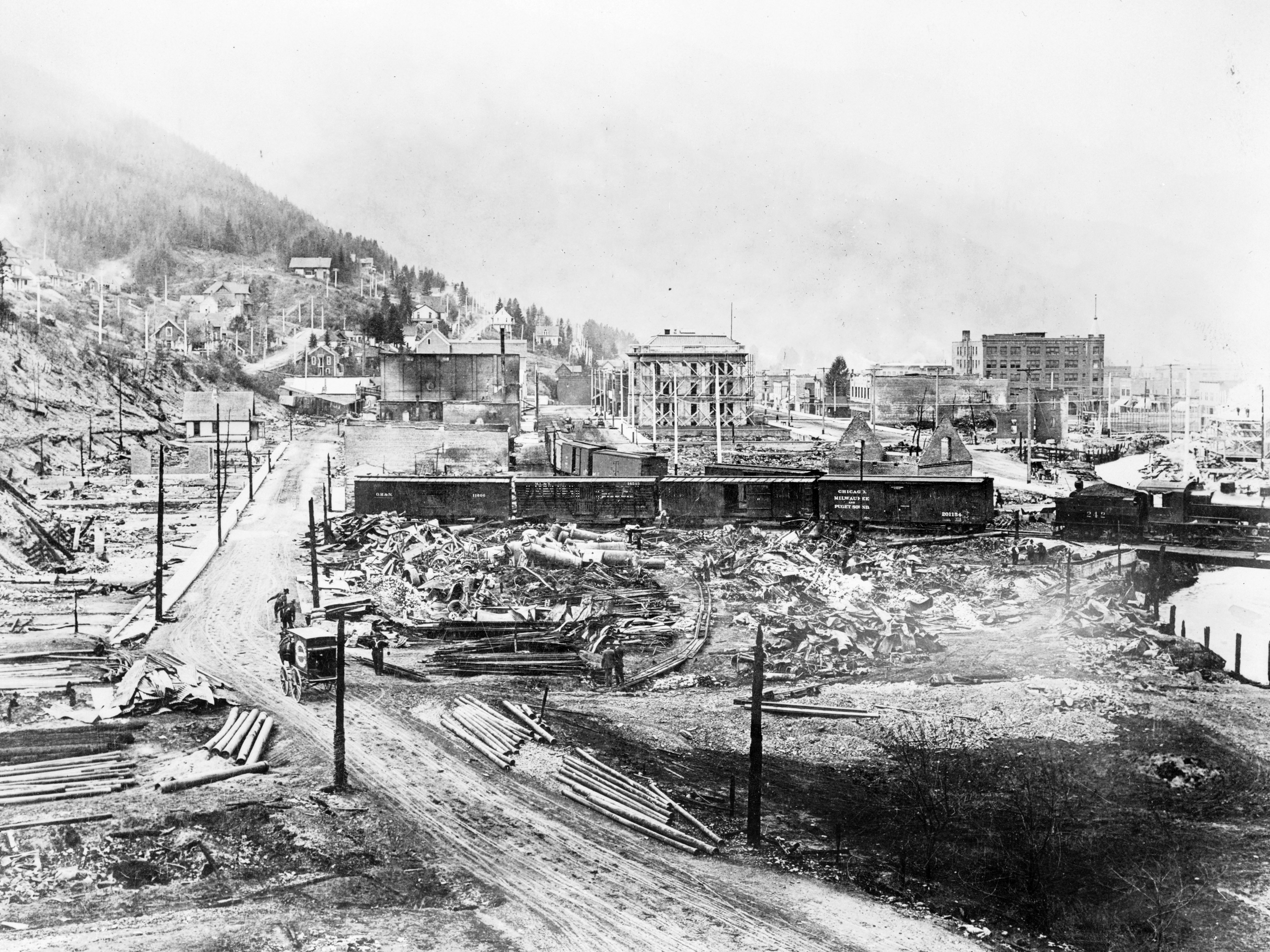
Wallace after the Great Fire of 1910

In 1893, Wallace went from governance by a board of trustees to a city charter. The first official mayor was William S. Haskins, who would shortly thereafter be appointed as Idaho's first State Mining Inspector. Haskins was succeeded by Oscar Wallace, son of Colonel Wallace. By that year, Wallace could also boast of the Providence Hospital, "an institution which has no equal of its kind in the state of Idaho, and no superior of its size in the United States".

In 1898, having experienced explosive growth, the city implemented a campaign to become the county seat for Shoshone County. A similar attempt six years earlier had left Wallace a distant third to Murray. This time around, Wallace garnered about three-quarters of the votes cast.

The year 1900 saw Wallace residents looking forward to even more growth from its population of over two thousand. They were proud of their extensive electric light system, substantial amounts of paved streets and the most building activity the city had ever seen.

However, one third of the town of Wallace was destroyed by the Great Fire of 1910, which burned about 3,000,000 acres (12,141 km^{2}; 4,688 sq mi) in Washington, Idaho, and Montana. Although set back by the devastation, the city soon resumed its growth, aided by strong demand for lead during World War I. After a post-war lull, the industry resumed its growth in the 1920s.

=== Famous for vice ===
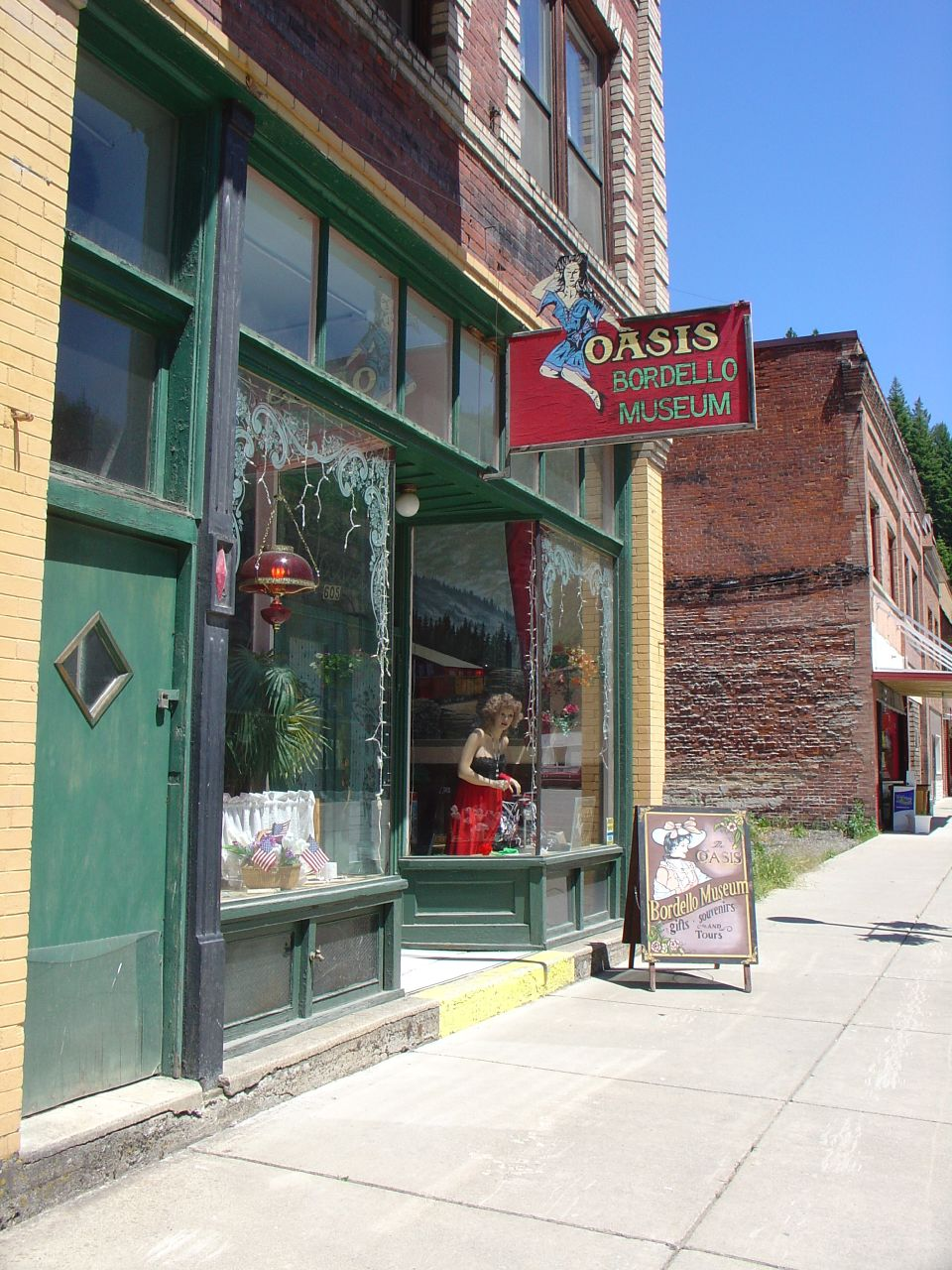
The Oasis Bordello Museum is a former brothel

A mining community with a "work hard, play hard" attitude, Wallace became well known for a permissive approach toward drinking, gambling and decriminalized prostitution. From 1884 to 1991, illegal yet regulated brothel-based sex work openly flourished because locals believed that sex work prevented rape and bolstered the economy, so long as it was regulated and confined to the northeastern part of town. Throughout the rest of the country, progressive era politics drove red-light districts underground, but madams in Wallace enjoyed unprecedented status as influential businesswomen, community leaders, and philanthropists. Between 1940 and 1960, for example, an average of 30 to 60 women came into town to work in one of the five well-established brothels.

=== Pollution versus jobs ===
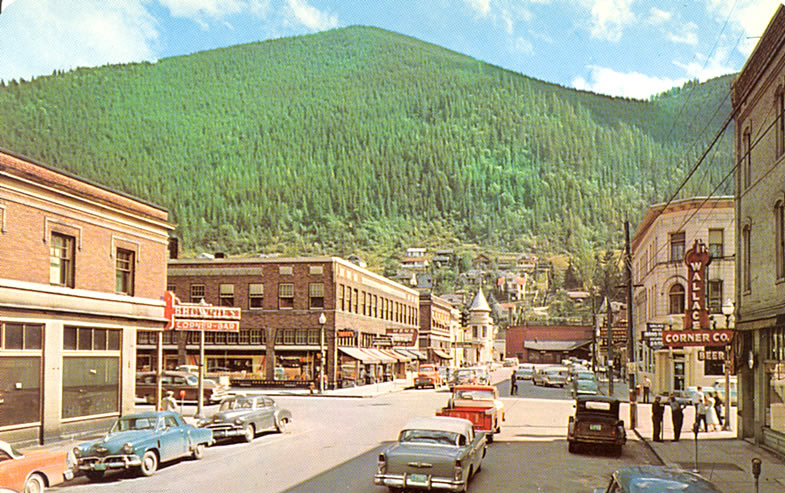
Downtown Wallace around 1956, old postcard

By around 1930, residents downstream from the Coeur d'Alene mines were complaining about water and air pollution. Operators downplayed the issue, but did make a few process concessions. Then the ravages of the Great Depression virtually eliminated the issue for the duration. That was followed by the ramp-up to World War II, which further kept the problems in the background. After the war, the metals industry in the region boomed, reaching a peak by around 1965. Process improvements continued but could not totally alleviate the effluent problems. And practically nothing was done about a half-century of pollution buildup.

Beginning in 1955, the U. S. Congress passed a series of air pollution laws, culminating in the Clean Air Act of 1970. That was followed two years later by the Federal Water Pollution Control Act. That and creation of the Environmental Protection Agency (EPA) put heavy pressure on mining operations, including those in the Coeur d'Alenes. When the Bunker Hill smelter in Kellogg shut down in 1981, the Silver Valley lost a vast number of jobs, three-quarters of all the regional mining employment by some estimates. Wallace suffered huge cutbacks just like all the other towns in the area. Only the Lucky Friday mine, located about 7 miles (11 km) east of Wallace, near Mullan, remains in operation at this time.

=== Historic preservation ===
Through the period of mine closures, Wallace had troubles of its own. In 1956, the Federal government authorized the Interstate Highway System and construction got under way. Then city leaders in Wallace learned that plans for Interstate 90 in Idaho would virtually wipe out the entire downtown. Their response is outlined in a section below. But the key event occurred in 1979, when several blocks of downtown Wallace were listed on the National Register of Historic Places as a historic district, the Wallace Historic District.

== Geography ==
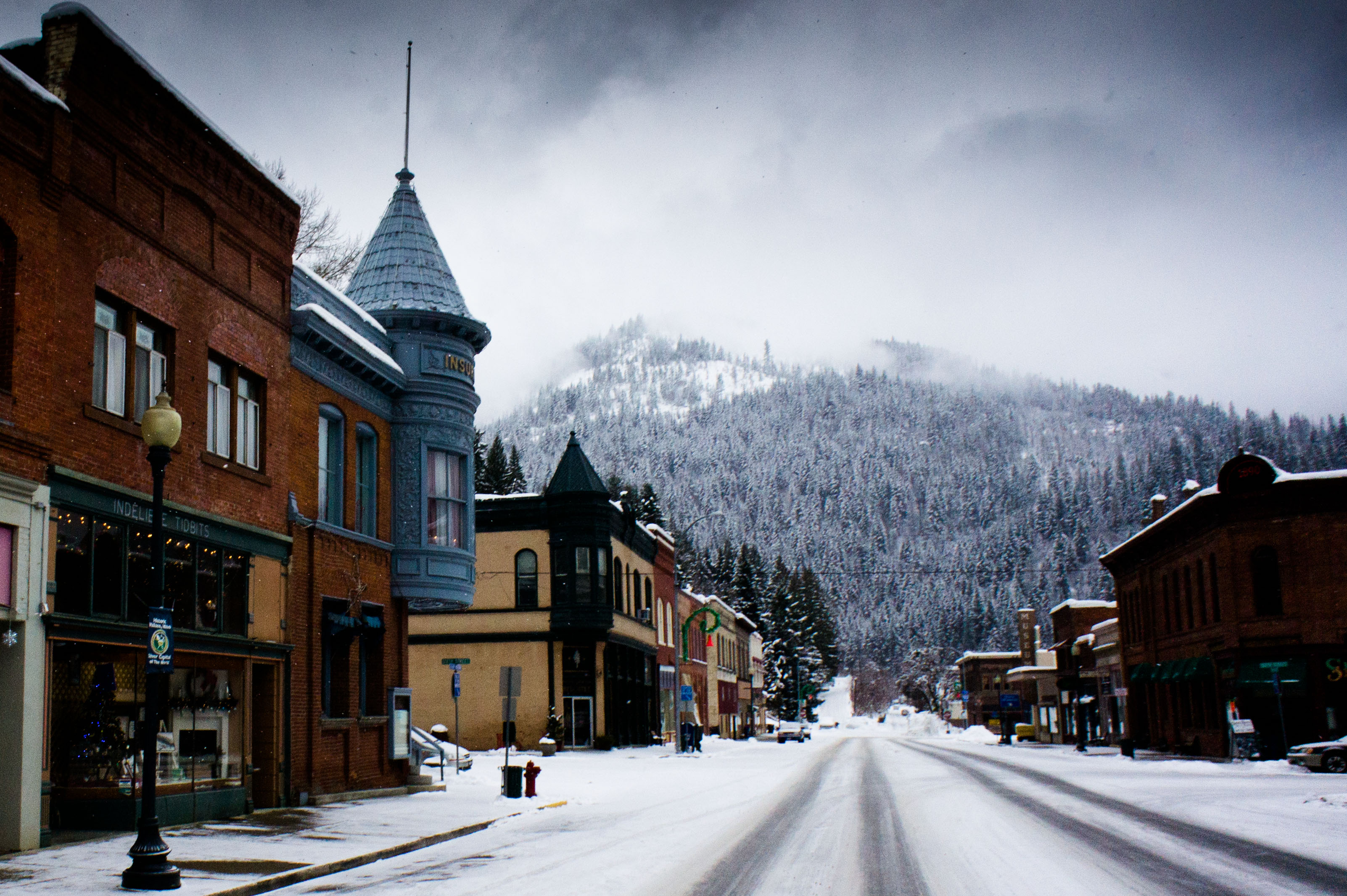
Downtown Wallace

According to the United States Census Bureau, the city has a total area of 0.84 square miles (2.18 km^{2}), all of it land.

=== Climate ===
Wallace has a continental Mediterranean climate (Köppen Dsb) with warm summers and cold, snowy winters. Winters are relatively moderate for an inland location so far north, although heavy rainfall often occurs when mild Pacific air penetrates inland, as in January 1974 when 14.56 inches (369.8 mm) of precipitation occurred including 3.07 inches (78.0 mm) on the 16th. July 1973 to June 1974 was also the wettest "rain year", receiving 56.27 inches or 1,429.3 millimetres, whilst the driest rain year from July 2000 to June 2001 saw only 21.96 inches or 557.8 millimetres. The most snowfall has been 91.0 inches (2.31 m) in January 1969; July 1968 to June 1969 also saw the maximum annual snowfall at 167.0 inches or 4.24 metres.

When cold air comes from Canada, temperatures can become severe, with the record low being −31 °F or −35 °C on December 30, 1968. The coldest month since records began in 1941 has been January 1949 with an average of 10.5 °F or −11.9 °C; the hottest has been July 2007 with a daily mean of 73.2 °F or 22.9 °C and a mean maximum of 91.1 °F or 32.8 °C.

Climate data for Wallace, Idaho (1991–2020 normals, extremes 1941–present)
Month	Jan	Feb	Mar	Apr	May	Jun	Jul	Aug	Sep	Oct	Nov	Dec	Year
Record high °F (°C)	57 (14)	67 (19)	77 (25)	91 (33)	96 (36)	103 (39)	102 (39)	106 (41)	101 (38)	88 (31)	70 (21)	58 (14)	106 (41)
Mean daily maximum °F (°C)	34.3 (1.3)	38.5 (3.6)	45.8 (7.7)	54.6 (12.6)	64.9 (18.3)	71.0 (21.7)	80.9 (27.2)	80.9 (27.2)	71.1 (21.7)	55.2 (12.9)	40.7 (4.8)	33.3 (0.7)	55.9 (13.3)
Daily mean °F (°C)	29.2 (−1.6)	31.4 (−0.3)	37.3 (2.9)	44.3 (6.8)	52.9 (11.6)	58.9 (14.9)	66.1 (18.9)	65.5 (18.6)	57.5 (14.2)	45.4 (7.4)	34.9 (1.6)	28.5 (−1.9)	46.0 (7.8)
Mean daily minimum °F (°C)	24.0 (−4.4)	24.4 (−4.2)	28.8 (−1.8)	33.9 (1.1)	41.0 (5.0)	46.8 (8.2)	51.3 (10.7)	50.1 (10.1)	43.8 (6.6)	35.6 (2.0)	29.2 (−1.6)	23.7 (−4.6)	36.1 (2.3)
Record low °F (°C)	−27 (−33)	−21 (−29)	−16 (−27)	15 (−9)	18 (−8)	28 (−2)	33 (1)	30 (−1)	12 (−11)	7 (−14)	−12 (−24)	−31 (−35)	−31 (−35)
Average precipitation inches (mm)	4.50 (114)	3.13 (80)	4.49 (114)	3.02 (77)	2.90 (74)	2.70 (69)	0.94 (24)	1.16 (29)	1.61 (41)	3.38 (86)	4.82 (122)	4.56 (116)	37.21 (945)
Average snowfall inches (cm)	19.7 (50)	13.3 (34)	11.5 (29)	1.3 (3.3)	0.2 (0.51)	0.0 (0.0)	0.0 (0.0)	0.0 (0.0)	0.0 (0.0)	0.4 (1.0)	6.5 (17)	22.7 (58)	75.6 (192)
Average precipitation days (≥ 0.01 in)	16.5	13.5	16.8	15.4	12.3	12.2	6.9	5.3	6.9	12.2	17.5	15.7	151.2
Average snowy days (≥ 0.1 in)	8.6	6.9	6.0	1.0	0.2	0.0	0.0	0.0	0.1	0.3	4.1	9.5	36.7
Source: NOAA

== Demographics ==
Historical population
Census	Pop.	Note	%±
1890	878		—
1900	2,265		158.0%
1910	3,000		32.5%
1920	2,816		−6.1%
1930	3,634		29.0%
1940	3,839		5.6%
1950	3,140		−18.2%
1960	2,412		−23.2%
1970	2,206		−8.5%
1980	1,736		−21.3%
1990	1,010		−41.8%
2000	960		−5.0%
2010	784		−18.3%
2020	791		0.9%
U.S. Decennial Census

=== 2010 census ===
As of the census of 2010, there were 784 people, 364 households, and 190 families residing in the city. The population density was 933.3 inhabitants per square mile (360.3/km^{2}). There were 535 housing units at an average density of 636.9 per square mile (245.9/km^{2}). The racial makeup of the city was 95.9% White, 0.1% African American, 1.0% Native American, 0.3% Asian, 0.4% from other races, and 2.3% from two or more races. Hispanic or Latino of any race were 2.3% of the population.

There were 364 households, of which 20.1% had children under the age of 18 living with them, 39.3% were married couples living together, 8.8% had a female householder with no husband present, 4.1% had a male householder with no wife present, and 47.8% were non-families. 42.3% of all households were made up of individuals, and 16.2% had someone living alone who was 65 years of age or older. The average household size was 1.99 and the average family size was 2.66.

The median age in the city was 47.5 years. Residents under the age of 18 comprise 16.1% of the population; 8.7% were between the ages of 18 and 24; 21.4% were from 25 to 44; 34.1% were from 45 to 64; and 19.5% were 65 years of age or older. The gender makeup of the city was 52.9% male and 47.1% female.

=== 2000 census ===
As of the census of 2000, there were 960 people, 427 households, and 237 families residing in the city. The population density was 1,104.4 inhabitants per square mile (426.4/km^{2}). There were 587 housing units at an average density of 675.3 per square mile (260.7/km^{2}). The racial makeup of the city was 94.90% White, 2.50% Native American, 0.10% Asian, 0.62% from other races, and 1.88% from two or more races. Hispanic or Latino of any race were 2.19% of the population.

There were 427 households, out of which 25.5% had children under the age of 18 living with them, 41.0% were married couples living together, 8.4% had a female householder with no husband present, and 44.3% were non-families. Individuals comprise 39.3% of all households, and 15.7% had someone living alone who was 65 years of age or older. The average household size was 2.14 and the average family size was 2.85.

In the city, the population was spread out, with 22.9% under the age of 18, 6.8% from 18 to 24, 28.4% from 25 to 44, 25.8% from 45 to 64, and 16.0% who were 65 years of age or older. The median age was 41 years. For every 100 females, there were 99.2 males. For every 100 females age 18 and over, there were 104.4 males.

The median income for a household in the city was $22,065, and the median income for a family was $33,472. Males had a median income of $25,288 versus $16,429 for females. The per capita income for the city was $14,699. About 12.8% of families and 20.1% of the population were below the poverty line, including 20.4% of those under age 18 and 10.5% of those age 65 or over.

== Education ==
Wallace is served by one elementary school and one secondary school, Wallace Junior/Senior High School.

== Arts and culture ==
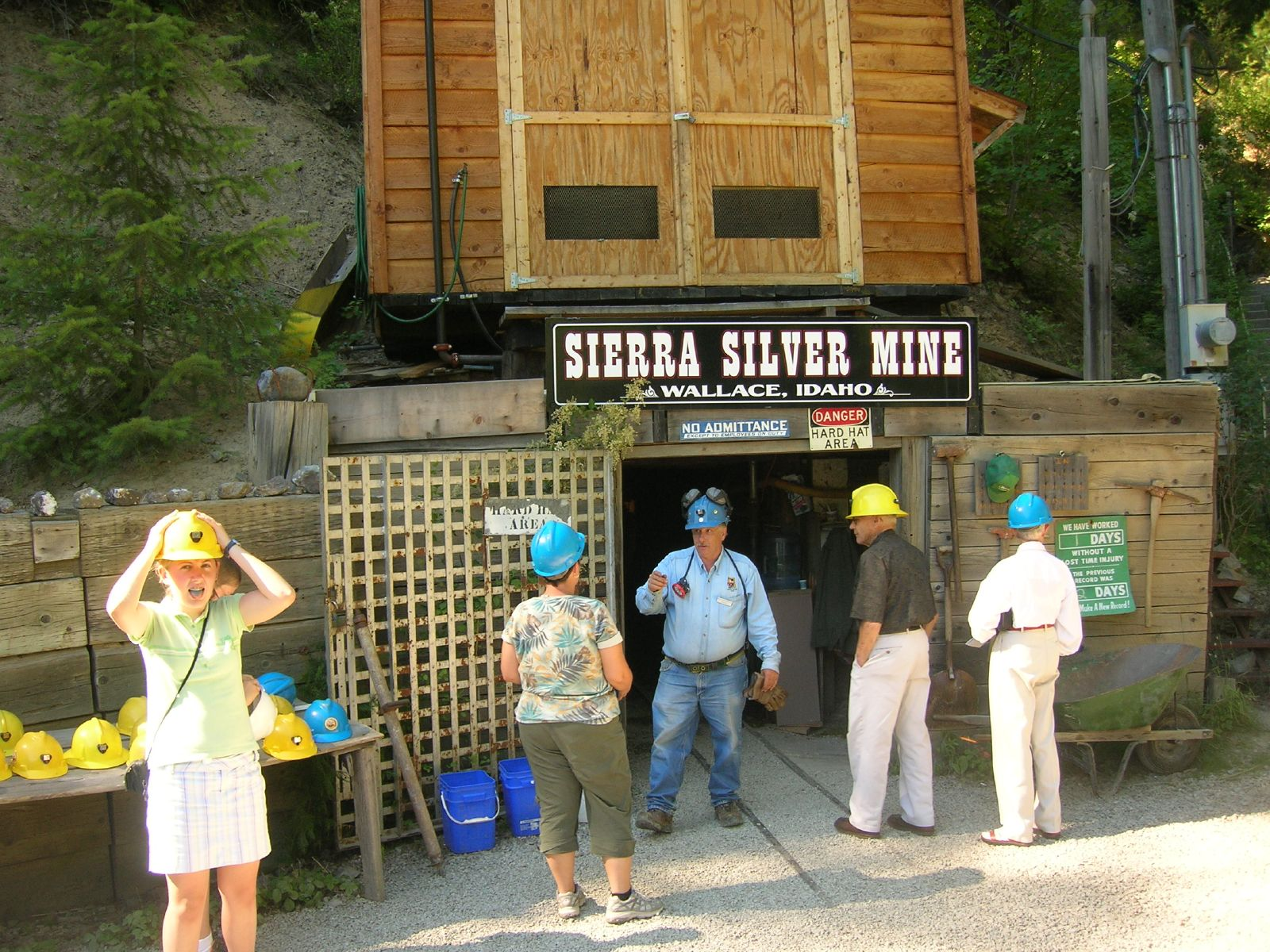
The Sierra Silver Mine museum

=== Museums ===
The Wallace District Mining Museum documents and recounts the legacy of over a century of mining history in the region. Mine tours are offered in the Sierra Silver Mine in Wallace and the Crystal Gold Mine in nearby Kellogg.

The Oasis Bordello Museum is dedicated to the history of sex work; housed in a former brothel, curious tourists or nostalgic former patrons can tour the upstairs, which has been preserved as it was when the women left. Although the Dumas Brothel in nearby Butte, Montana claims to be the longest operating brothel in the United States, all five of the Wallace, Idaho brothels rival it in terms of length, with the Oasis Rooms operating continuously until 1988 and the U&I Rooms outlasting the Dumas by nine years before closing in 1991. The former Lux Rooms has been repurposed into a boutique inn, and it also has many elements preserved from its brothel roots, including floor-to-ceiling gold veined mirrors.

The Barnard-Stockbridge Museum, located in the historic Holy Trinity Episcopal Church, displays period memorabilia and photographs maintained by the University of Idaho Barnard-Stockbridge Photograph Collection. The collection consists of large format photographs taken by the studio of Thomas Barnard and Nellie Stockbridge between 1893 and 1965. The collection of photographs is considered the best photographic collection in the Northwest United States and one of the seven best collections in the county.

=== Events ===
Regular annual events in Wallace include the Blues Fest, Statehood Day Parade, Huckleberry Festival 5k Walk/Run, Under the Freeway Flea Market, Gyro Days, Center Of The Universe Re-Dedication, Fall for History, Extreme SkiJor, and Home for the Holidays Christmas Festival.

== Infrastructure ==
=== Transportation ===
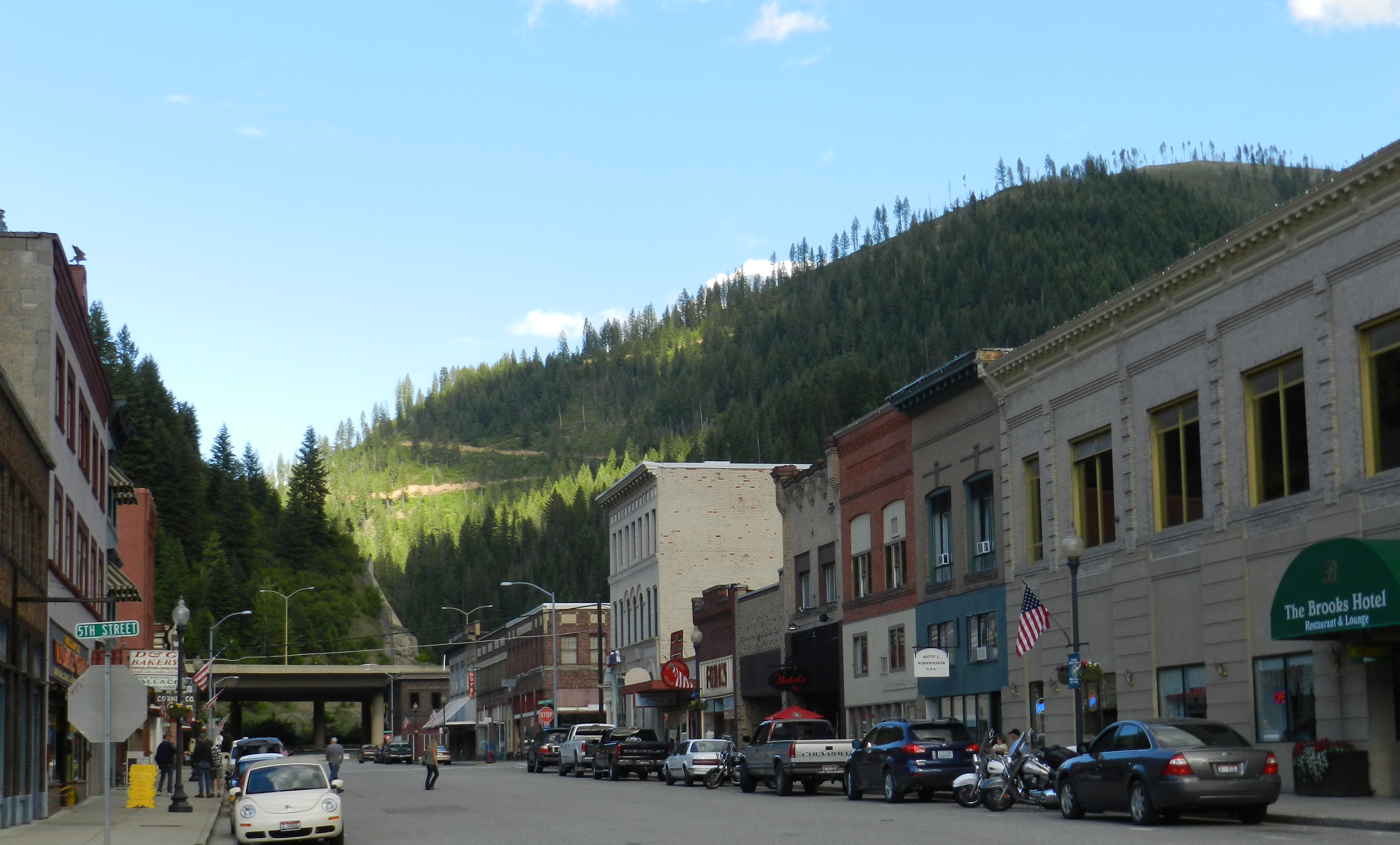
Downtown, with the I-90 overpass visible down the street

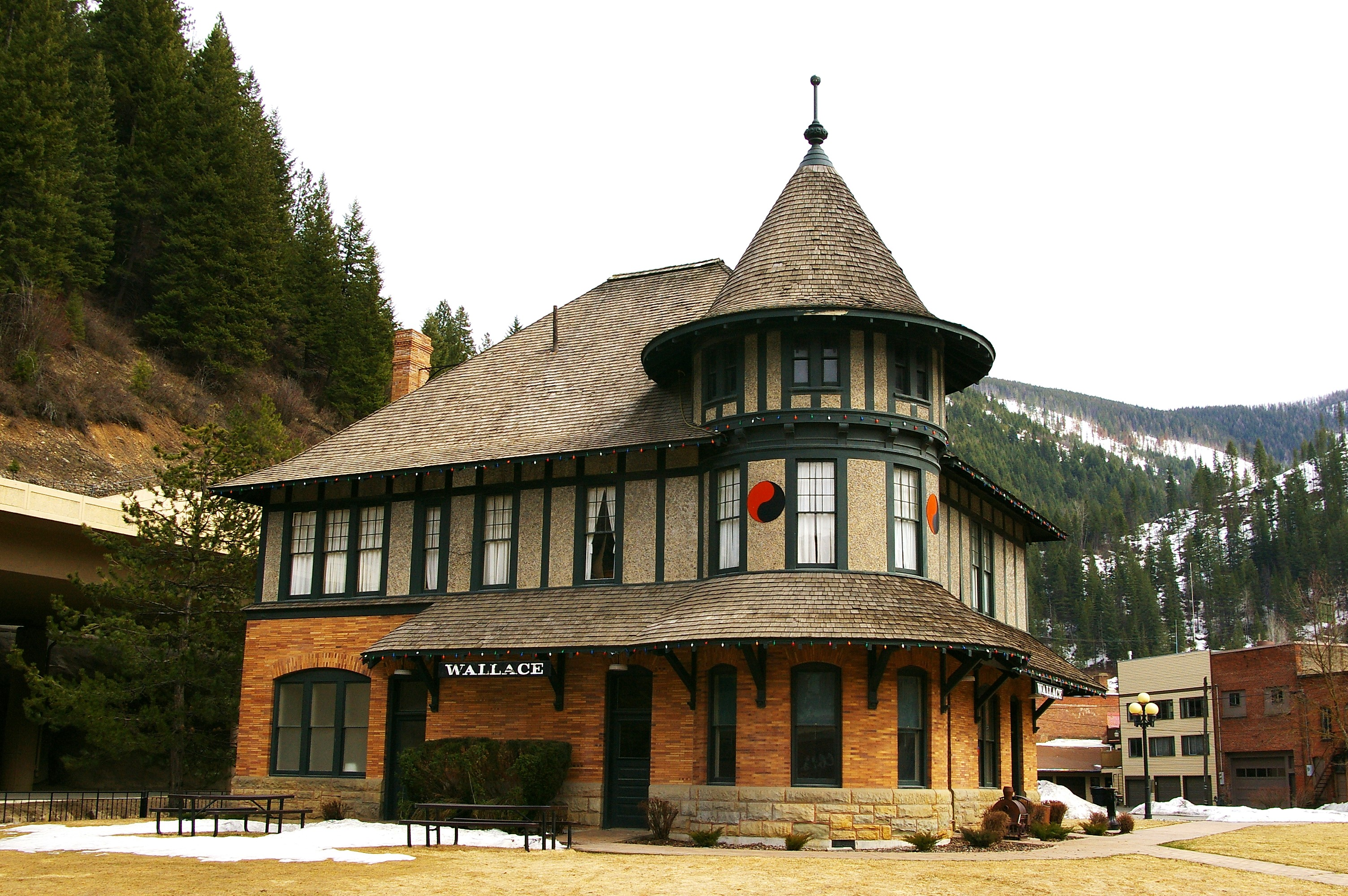
Former Northern Pacific depot

Wallace is accessible via Interstate 90 and State Highway 4. The nearest airport is Shoshone County Airport (S83), about 15 road miles (25 km) west, near Smelterville, which is a general aviation facility. The nearest airport with significant commercial service is Spokane International Airport (GEG), about 87 road miles (140 km) west.

In its prime, two railroads served Wallace. The Oregon-Washington Railway & Navigation Co. (Union Pacific) reached Wallace from the west, offering passenger service to Spokane and Portland until about 1958, and freight service to Spokane as late as 1992. The Northern Pacific Railway approached Wallace from the east with its branch over Lookout Pass to the NP mainline at St. Regis, Montana. The former NP depot was listed on the National Register of Historic Places in 1976. To avoid demolition during freeway construction, it was moved 300 feet (90 m) south a decade later in 1986. Now at Sixth and Pine streets, it currently functions as a local railroad museum.

The former NP line was abandoned and removed between St. Regis and Mullan in 1980. Union Pacific continued operating the Wallace-Mullan segment of the NP line until abandoning the entire Plummer-Mullan route in 1992. After abandonment, this segment of former UP and NP lines was developed into a rail trail, the Trail of the Coeur d'Alenes, which runs from east of Mullan through Wallace, to the Washington-Idaho state line west of Plummer.

Several miles to the south, the Chicago, Milwaukee, St. Paul and Pacific Railroad, commonly called the Milwaukee Road, ran transcontinental passenger trains on its Pacific Extension between Chicago and Seattle from 1911 to 1961, with freight trains until 1980. After the Milwaukee Road discontinued and abandoned the route, much of it also became a rail trail, the "Route of the Hiawatha Trail". Currently, it runs from Taft, Montana (near the top of Lookout Pass), descending west to Avery. This trail is at least 15 miles (24 km) distant at its closest point, but as the nearest large community, Wallace advertises itself as the primary jumping off point for trail users.

==== Interstate 90 ====
Interstate 90 passes through Wallace on an elevated freeway viaduct, completed in 1991. Until then, I-90 traffic used a surface highway previously designated U.S. Route 10 and used the main city streets through downtown. Wallace had the last traffic light on a coast-to-coast Interstate highway, a fact that is displayed on signage in downtown Wallace proclaiming it to be "The Last Stoplight". In September 1991, the Idaho Department of Transportation moved I-90 to a freeway viaduct above the north side of town. Prior to this, the interstate turned into arterial streets on the western outskirts of town and followed the main road through town before becoming a highway again on Wallace's east side. The section of US-10 through Wallace is now designated Interstate 90 Business.

The Federal Highway Administration (FHWA) originally planned to build I-90 as an at-grade freeway. This plan would have demolished most of downtown Wallace. In the 1970s, city leaders listed every building in the downtown on the National Register of Historic Places. The FHWA had to redesign I-90 to bypass downtown because federal law protects historic places from negative effects of highway construction. An elevated viaduct was erected.

== Notable people ==
- Weldon Heyburn (1852–1912), U.S. Senator (1903–1912)
- Doris Houck (1921–1965), actress
- Guy McPherson (b. 1960), scientist and professor specializing in ecological issues
- Michael Norell (1937–2023) actor and screenwriter
- Ed Pulaski (1868–1931), forest ranger noted for his heroism in the Great Fire
- Mike Riley (born 1953), former head football coach at Oregon State and Nebraska
- Lana Turner (1921–1995), film actress, was born in Wallace and spent her early childhood there
- William J. Murphy (March 12, 1912 – August 20, 1993) was a Democratic politician from Idaho. He served as the state's 34th lieutenant governor from 1977 to 1979, during the administration of Governor John V. Evans.

== In popular culture ==
The 1997 film Dante's Peak was shot on location in Wallace, which was portrayed as the fictional town "Dante's Peak" in Washington state, with a large hill just southeast of the town digitally altered to look like a volcano.

On September 25, 2004, Mayor Ron Garitone proclaimed Wallace to be the center of the Universe in a tongue-in-cheek political statement aimed at the EPA. Specifically, a sewer access cover was declared to be the precise location of the "Center of the Universe". This declaration was a humorous jab at the EPA's reliance on "probabilism," a theory the agency employed when declaring Wallace a Superfund site. During their assessment, the EPA announced that local water and soil were contaminated, potentially due to mining activities. However, they admitted they could not definitively prove whether the lead contamination was from ongoing mining operations or naturally occurring. Using probabilistic reasoning, they expanded the Superfund site from 21 square miles (54 km^{2}) to 1,500 square miles (3,900 km^{2}), significantly devaluing local properties and businesses. The EPA's assessment controversially treated lead sulfide, a less harmful and less bioavailable form of lead, as equivalent to pure lead, further fueling local criticism of the Superfund designation. For example, lead sulfide bioavailability in some animal studies is estimated to be 50 to 100 times lower than that of soluble lead salts.

In response, the Center of the Universe manhole cover was designed and installed to symbolize Wallace's resilience and mining heritage. It bears the inscription "Center of the Universe. Wallace, Idaho" and includes four sets of initials—HL, CDE, SRLM, and BHM—representing four major mining companies that shaped the region: Hecla Mining, Coeur d’Alene Precious Metals, Sunshine Silver Mine, and Bunker Hill Mining Company. This act of defiance also paid homage to Wallace's mining legacy, which dates back to 1884 and has yielded over 1.2 billion ounces of silver, earning the town the title "Silver Capital of the World".

This whimsical declaration also inspired British comedian and writer Danny Wallace to visit Wallace, leading to his book Danny Wallace and the Centre of the Universe, published in 2006. The event continues to be celebrated annually on the third Saturday of September.
