= National Federation of Press Women =

The National Federation of Press Women (NFPW) is a United States–based organization of professional women and men pursuing careers in the field of communications, including electronic, broadcast and print journalism, public relations, marketing, advertising, freelancing, graphic design, digital media and photography. They are also educators and authors of all genres. Part of the coalition founding the National Women's History Museum, the NFPW supports literacy and women's rights as well as freedom of information and advocates for First Amendment issues.

== History ==
The National Federation of Press Women (NFPW) was organized May 6, 1937, when Helen Miller Malloch and other members of the Illinois Woman's Press Association (IWPA organized in 1885), along with women from five other states and the District of Columbia, who met at the Chicago Women's Club in order to promote communication between women writers, and advance the interests and standards of women in the press. One of the major concerns of these women was that copyright legislation was not being applied equally to women's creative work. Among the 39 women attending were 24 from Illinois, six from Indiana, nine from Ohio, New York, Michigan, and Washington D.C.. Incorporation of the Federation was effected in 1938 in Illinois. By 1939 nine states had affiliated, including New York, New Jersey, Indiana, Illinois, Missouri, Iowa, Texas, Oregon, and Michigan; and a New England press group. Of these new affiliates, the two oldest were Illinois (IWPA), 1885, and Texas, (the Texas Woman's Press Association) 1893 - the only two states organized prior to 1900.

== Presidents (by term dates) ==
1. Helen Miller Malloch, (Illinois) 1937–1938
2. Octavia Goodbar, ( New York ) 1938–1939
3. Bertha Bliss, ( Missouri) 1940–1941
4. Helen Miller Malloch, (Illinois) 1942–1943
5. Gertrude Puelicher, (Wisconsin) 1943–1945
6. Marie Abels, (Kansas) 1945–1947
7. Catherine Dines Prosser, (Colorado) 1947–1949
8. Irene R. Bedard, (Minnesota) 1949–1951
9. Mattie M. Dykes, (Missouri) 1951–1953
10. Helen Ankeny, (Kansas) 1953–1955
11. Velma Price, (Nebraska) 1955–1957
12. Mabel Temby, (Wisconsin) 1957–1959
13. Helen Vanderburg, (Iowa) 1959–1961
14. Roberta Martin, (Arkansas) 1961–1962
15. Dr. Gertrude M. Hall, (acting) (Illinois) 1962
16. Hortense P. Myers, (Indiana) 1962–1965
17. Margaret Magee, (Oregon) 1965–1967
18. Ulrich Troubetzkoy, (Virginia) 1967–1969
19. Mildred Planthold Michie, (Missouri) 1969–1971
20. Louise Shadduck, (Idaho) 1971–1973
21. Naomi A. Whitesell, (Indiana) 1973–1975
22. Jean Wiley Huyler, (Washington) 1975–1977
23. Charlotte Tillar Schexnayder, (Arkansas) 1977–1979
24. Martha S. Reed, (Texas) 1979–1981
25. D. J. Cline, (South Dakota) 1981–1983
26. Jo Cart, (Louisiana) 1983–1985
27. Lois Jacobs, (Iowa) 1985–1987
28. Mary Lou Webb, (Mississippi) 1987–1989
29. Rosemary Carroll, (New Jersey) 1989–1991
30. Marj Carpenter, (Kentucky) 1991–1993
31. Gwen White, (North Carolina) 1993–1995
32. Ruth Anna, (Colorado) 1995–1997
33. Linn Rounds, (Wyoming) 1997–1999
34. Vivian Sadowski, (Kansas) 1999–2001
35. Ella Wright, (Alaska) 2001–2003
36. Donna Penticuff, (Indiana) 2003–2005
37. Meg Hunt, (South Carolina) 2005–2007
38. Marsha Shuler, (Louisiana) 2007–2009
39. Cynthia Price, (Virginia) 2009–2011
40. Lori Potter, (Nebraska) 2011–2013
41. Teri Ehresman, (Idaho) 2013–2015
42. Marsha Hoffman, (Iowa) 2015–2017
43. Marianne Wolf-Astrauskas, (Illinois) 2017–2019
44. Gwendolynne Larson, (Kansas) 2019–2021
45. Karen Rowley, (Louisiana) 2021-2022

== Activity ==
The NFPW conducts annual surveys about women in communications jobs.

NFPW also created its own publication, Press Woman. AGENDA is the Federation's current publication.

== Competitions ==
=== Professional Communications Contest ===
Each year NFPW sponsors competitions to reward excellence in communication. Winners are honored at the NFPW Professional Communications Contest Awards Banquet, which is held in conjunction with a yearly conference. The Federation's annual communications contest was established in 1940 during the presidency of Bertha I. Bless of Missouri. The presentation of honor award certificates to national winners and the announcement of the national sweepstakes winner remains a conference highlight. NFPW affiliates throughout the United States have annual communications contests that provide affiliate members an opportunity to compete against regional colleagues in a broad range of categories set by NFPW. All entrants to the national contest are required to be professional, student or retired members of NFPW. Where there is no state affiliate, the member is eligible to compete in the At-Large contest.

=== National High School Communications Contest ===
The NFPW High School Communications Contest honors excellence in student journalism and is the only nationwide communications competition for high school students. Winners at the national level are chosen by winning at the state level first. It is endorsed by the National Association of Secondary School Principals. Dow Jones announces first-place winners and promotes the competition in its publication distributed to journalism advisers across the nation, giving students and their teachers/advisers local and nationwide recognition.

== Communicator of Achievement ==
Each year, a professional communicator is selected as the National Communicator of Achievement. This program was established during the presidency of Velma Price of Nebraska. NFPW started the program as the Woman of Achievement award which was first given at the 1957 convention in San Antonio, Texas. The first honoree was Charlotte Paul of Washington. The award was renamed Communicator of Achievement in 1989. Today, the Communicator of Achievement Award is the highest honor bestowed by the National Federation of Press Women upon those members who have distinguished themselves within and beyond their profession.

Virginia Driving Hawk Sneve, the 1975 Woman of Achievement, was an author of 20 books, numerous short stories and essays about Native American life and culture, a member of the South Dakota affiliate, and the recipient of the National Medal of Humanities. The Medal of Humanities was presented by President Bill Clinton and First Lady Hillary Rodham Clinton on December 20, 2000, at D.A.R. Constitution Hall in Washington DC.

Randy Richardson, a member of the Illinois Woman's Press Association affiliate, was the 2017 Communicator of Achievement winner, becoming the first man to take the honor in 60 years.

=== Communicator of Achievement Honorees ===
The following individuals have been honored:

- 1957 Charlotte Paul (Washington)
- 1958 Margaret Dixon (Louisiana)
- 1959 Emma C. McKinney (Oregon)
- 1960 Roberta "Bobbie" Forster (Arkansas)
- 1961 No Award
- 1962 Agness Underwood (California)
- 1963 Helen Waterhouse (Ohio)
- 1964 Olive Burt (Utah)
- 1965 Vada Carlson Rodridguez (Arizona)
- 1966 Hortense Myers (Indiana)
- 1967 Gladys Erickson (Illinois)
- 1968 Mamie Boyd (Kansas)
- 1969 Hilda Bryant (Washington)
- 1970 Charlotte Schexnadyer (Arkansas)
- 1971 Hazel Brannon Smith (Mississippi)
- 1972 Marjorie Holmes (Virginia)
- 1973 Ruth Carlson (Michigan)
- 1974 Emily Ivanoff Brown (Alaska) / Katharine Graham (District of Columbia)
- 1975 Virginia Sneve (South Dakota)
- 1976 Lois Watkins (Virginia)
- 1977 Margaret Woolfolk (Arkansas)
- 1978 Kathy Piper (Colorado)
- 1979 Joann Easley Arnold (Colorado)
- 1980 Lynn Stewart (Louisiana)
- 1981 Faye Plank (New Mexico)
- 1982 Betzi Woodman (Alaska)
- 1983 Ann McKay Thompson (South Dakota)
- 1984 Marj Carpenter (Georgia)
- 1985 Lois Lambley (Nebraska)
- 1986 Joanne Zerkel (Illinois)
- 1987 Kay Kennedy (Alaska)
- 1988 Jean Wiley Huyler (Washington)
- 1989 Donna Hunt (Texas)
- 1990 D. J. Cline (South Dakota)
- 1991 Dorothy Steinmeier (Indiana)
- 1992 Olga Gize Carlile (Illinois)
- 1993 Joan Burney (Nebraska)
- 1994 Mary Rueter (Iowa)
- 1995 Jan Ingram (Alaska)
- 1996 Vivien Sadowski (Kansas)
- 1997 Louise Seals (Virginia)
- 1998 Marjorie Setter (Kansas)
- 1999 No Award
- 2000 Eva Marie Pearson (Arkansas)
- 2001 Jane Brandt (North Dakota)
- 2002 Kay Wood Bailey (Delaware)
- 2003 Carole Eberly (Michigan)
- 2004 Mary Kimbrough (Missouri)
- 2005 Ree Strange Sheck (New Mexico)
- 2006 Betty Packard (California)
- 2007 Peggyann Hutchinson (Oregon)
- 2008 Clara Cartrette (North Carolina) / Cary Herz (New Mexico)
- 2009 Heloise (Texas)
- 2010 Karen Stensrud (North Dakota)
- 2011 Beth Miller Delaware)
- 2012 Cynthia Price (Virginia)
- 2013 Marianne Wolf-Astrauskas (Illinois)
- 2014 Becky Funke (Kansas)
- 2015 Barbara Gigone (Colorado)
- 2016 Loretta Hall (New Mexico)
- 2017 Randy Richardson (Illinois)
- 2018 Billie Travalini (Delaware)
- 2019 Eileen Wirth (Nebraska)
- 2020 Sandy Michel Nance (Colorado)
- 2021 Sherri Burr (New Mexico)
- 2022 LuAnn Schindler (Nebraska)
- 2023 Marilyn Saltzman (Colorado)
- 2024 Gwen White (North Carolina)
