= Idaho's Women of Influence =

Idaho's Women of Influence is a database originally compiled in 2014 by researchers Annie Gaines and Mike Bullard. The women listed are considered by the university to be some of the most accomplished in Idaho's history. It is a living database continually updated by librarians, educators, museum staff, tribal authorities, women’s organizations. The database is provided by the University of Idaho Library, and is open to credibly sourced submissions from the general public.

This list is not to be confused with the East Idaho Women of Influence, sponsored by the East Idaho Business Journal and the Adams Publishing Group.

== Inductees ==
University of Idaho Library list of Women of Influence
Name	Image	Birth–Death	Notability	Ref(s)
Margaret Cobb Ailshie		(1883–1959)	Publisher of the Idaho Statesman	
Verda Rebecca White Barnes		(1907–1980)	Chief of Staff and political strategist for US Senator Frank Church	
Carol Ryrie Brink		(1895–1981)	Children's author who won the Newbery Medal for Caddie Woodlawn	
Mary Brooks		(1907–2002)	Director of the United States Mint under Richard Nixon and Gerald Ford. United States Secretary of the Treasury William E. Simon presented her with the Alexander Hamilton Award.	
Helen Chenoweth-Hage		(1938–2006)	United States House of Representatives January 3, 1995 – January 3, 2001	
Mary Elizabeth Donaldson		(1851–1941)	aka (Mary Craker) Physician, co-founder of Idaho Sanitarium Institute, the Donaldson Home for the Aging, and Idaho Magazine.	
Abigail Scott Duniway		(1834–1915)	Suffragist, newspaper editor and writer.	
Permeal J. French		(1867–1954)	Dean of Women at University of Idaho, and the first woman elected to state-wide office in Idaho.	
Maggie Hall		(1853–1888)	aka Molly B'Damn – brothel madam in Murray, Idaho, who used her income to feed and house the homeless. Annual Molly B'Damn Gold Rush Days honors her legacy.	
Christine Holbert		(b. 1952)	Founding director of Lost Horse Press	
Minnie Howard		(1872–1965)	Physician whose civic involvement, often as president or chair of any civic organization, helped build the Pocatello Public Library.	
Mary Kirkwood		(1904–1995)	Artist and a professor at the University of Idaho	
Edith Miller Klein		(1915–1958)	Judge of the Municipal Court in Boise. Employed by Federal Communications Commission and was admitted to the United States Supreme Court Bar in 1954. She was elected to the Idaho House of Representatives in 1964, and elected to the Idaho State Senate in 1968–1982.	
Velma Morrison		(1920–2013)	Philanthropist, the Velma V. Morrison Center for the Performing Arts on the Boise State University honors her efforts.	
Lee Morse		(1897–1954)	Jazz and blues singer-songwriter, composer, guitarist, and actress.	
Sarah Palin		(b. 1964)	Politician, former Governor of Alaska. Republican Party nominee for Vice President in the 2008 Presidential election, alongside Arizona Senator John McCain. Born in Sandpoint, Idaho	
Gracie Pfost		(1906–1965)	Five-terms United States House of Representatives.	
Marjorie Reynolds		(1917–1997)	Actress	
Margaret Ritchie		(1895–1986)	Head of the Home Economics department at the University of Idaho 1938–1959.	
Marilynne Robinson		(b. 1943)	Novelist and essayist. Pulitzer Prize for Fiction in 2005, National Humanities Medal in 2012, and the 2016 Library of Congress Prize for American Fiction. In 2016, Robinson was named in Time magazine's list of 100 most influential people.	
Louise Shadduck		(1915–2008)	Journalist, author, political activist.	
Jennie Eva Hughes Smith		(1877–1939)	First African-American to graduate from the University of Idaho. The university's Jennie Eva Hughes Award is given annually for involvement in multicultural issues and dedication to campus multiculturalism.	
Nellie Stockbridge		(1868–1965)	Photographer	
Belle Sweet		(1879–1964)	Served as the University of Idaho Librarian 1905–1948, compiling the largest library collection in the state of Idaho.	
Dorice Taylor		(1901–1987)	Public relations for Sun Valley, Idaho. Author of two books, Sun Valley in 1980, and Idaho ghost towns : past and present, with special insert on the Yankee Fork. 1984 Inductee into the U.S. Ski and Snowboard Hall of Fame.	
Lana Turner		(1921–1995)	Actress	
Betty Penson-Ward		(1914–2002)	Journalist	
Benedicte Wrensted		(1859–1949)	Danish photographer documentation of the Northern Shoshone, Lemhi, and Bannock tribes in Idaho between 1895–1912.	
Mary Allen Wright		(1868–1948)	Speaker of the Idaho House of Representatives, and served as Clerk of the House. Owner of Wright's Loan and Investment Company.	
Emma Russell Yearian		(1866–1951)	Educator, sheep herder, and first woman to represent Lemhi County in the Idaho House of Representatives. Nicknamed the Sheep Queen of Idaho.	
