= Steph Littlebird =

Native American artist

- Born: 1984 or 1985 (age 41–42); Banks, Oregon, U.S.
- Citizenship: United States; Confederated Tribes of Grand Ronde
- Education: Pacific Northwest College of Art (BFA)
- Website: www.stephlittlebird.com

Steph Littlebird is a Native American multimedia artist, illustrator, and exhibit curator who is a member of the Confederated Tribes of Grand Ronde. She is known for her curation of the exhibit, "This is Kalapuyan Land".

== Early life and education ==
Littlebird was born in 1984 or 1985 and grew up in Banks, Oregon. She is an enrolled member of the Confederated Tribes of Grande Ronde.

She graduated from Pacific Northwest College of Art in 2015 with a Bachelor of Fine Arts in Painting and Printmaking.

== Graphic design and illustration ==
Littlebird re-designed the Yahoo logo for 2022 Native American Heritage Month using Native American-inspired patterns. The final "O" was used as Yahoo's avatar on its social media platforms for the month of November.

My Powerful Hair was published in March 2023 through Abrams Books for Young Readers. The children's book was written by Carole Lindstrom and illustrated by Littlebird.

Littlebird created a portrait of Shimkhin displayed as part of the exhibit My Father's Father's Sister: Our Ancestor Shimkhin, which opened at Chachalu Tribal Museum and Cultural Center in 2023.

Littlebird has artwork displayed in the exterior window niches of the Jordan Schnitzer Museum of Art as well as other locations around the University of Oregon.

Fierce Aunties, a children's book written by Laurel Goodluck and illustrated by Littlebird, was published in April 2025. The Summer of the Bones Horses was also published April 2025, through Abrams Books for Young Readers. It is a chapter book written by Virginia Driving Hawk Sneve and illustrated by Littlebird.

You are the Land, written and illustrated by Littlebird, was released in 2026.

== Curatorial career ==
Littlebird first curated This Is Kalapuyan Land at the Five Oaks Museum (formerly Washington County Museum) in 2019. The exhibit incorporated materials from a 2008 Five Oaks Museum exhibit titled This Kalapuya Land, which were then visibly annotated and edited by LIttlebird with help from Grand Ronde historian David G. Lewis. These panels were displayed alongside works by contemporary Indigenous artists. A modified version of the exhibit opened at the Pittock Mansion in 2023.

Littlebird curated the exhibition Ancestors, hosted by the Portland Parks & Recreation at the Multnomah Arts Center in 2024.

Littlebird curated the Salem Art Association Exhibition Indigenous Northwest, on view at the Bush Barn Art Center from September 6 to October 27, 2024. In 2026, Littlebird curated Salem Art Association's first Indigenous Northwest Biennial, also at the Bush Barn Art Center, on display from September 4 to October 25. The exhibition included artwork by Anthony Hudson among others.

== Awards and fellowships ==
- 2020 AICAD-NOAA National Fellowship recipient
- '20 Caldera Artist in Residence
- 2019 Regional Arts and Culture Council (RACC) project grant awardee
- 2025 Oregon Community Foundation's Creative Heights grant
