= Anthony Hudson =

Anthony Hudson may refer to:

- Anthony Hudson (commentator) (born 1971), Australian sports commentator
- Anthony Hudson (entertainer), American artist and drag performer known by the stage name Carla Rossi
- Anthony Hudson (soccer) (born 1981), English-American association football manager
- Tony Hudson (born 1958), American college and minor league baseball pitcher
