= Mary Donaldson (disambiguation) =

Mary Donaldson is the birth name of Queen Mary of Denmark (born 1972).

Mary Donaldson may also refer to:

- Mary Donaldson, Lady Donaldson of Lymington (1921–2003), Lord Mayor of London
- Mary Ethel Muir Donaldson (1876–1954), British author and photographer
- Mary Elizabeth Donaldson (physician) (1851–1941), American physician
