= Oregon Trail Memorial half dollar =

US commemorative 50-cent coin

- United States
- Value: 50 cents (0.50 US dollars)
- Mass: 12.5 g
- Diameter: 30.61 mm (1.20 in)
- Thickness: 2.15 mm (0.08 in)
- Edge: Reeded
- Composition: 90.0% silver; 10.0% copper
- Silver: 0.36169 troy oz
- Years of minting: 1926, 1928, 1933, 1934, 1936–1939
- Mint marks: D, S. Just to the left of the ground on which the Indian stands. Philadelphia Mint coins struck without mint mark.

"Indian side"
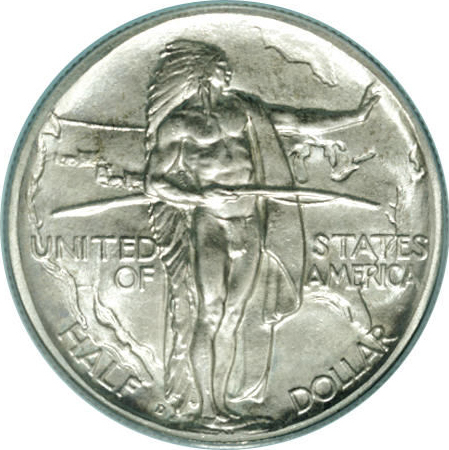
- Design: Native American standing in front of a US map
- Designer: Laura Gardin Fraser
- Design date: 1926

"Wagon side"
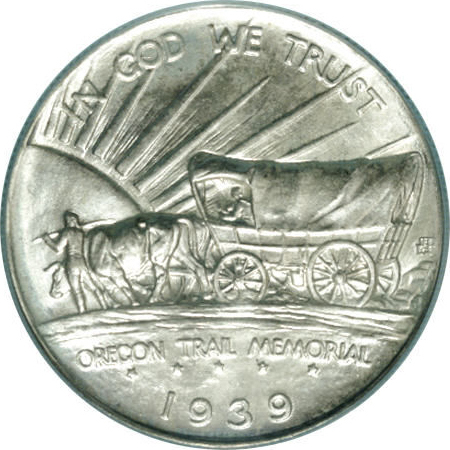
- Design: Ox-drawn covered wagon being led west toward the setting sun
- Designer: James Earle Fraser
- Design date: 1926

The Oregon Trail Memorial half dollar was a fifty-cent piece struck intermittently by the United States Bureau of the Mint between 1926 and 1939. The coin was designed by Laura Gardin Fraser and James Earle Fraser, and commemorates those who traveled the Oregon Trail and settled the Pacific Coast of the United States in the mid-19th century. Struck over a lengthy period in small numbers per year, the many varieties produced came to be considered a ripoff by coin collectors, and led to the end, for the time, of the commemorative coin series.

Ohio-born Ezra Meeker had traveled the Trail with his family in 1852 and spent the final two decades of his long life before his death in 1928 publicizing the Oregon Trail, that it should not be forgotten. In 1926, at age 95, he appeared before a Senate committee, requesting that the government issue a commemorative coin that could be sold to raise money for markers to show where the Trail had been. The coin had originally been thought of by Idahoans, led by Dr. Minnie Howard, seeking to further preservation work at Fort Hall; Meeker broadened the idea. Congress authorized six million half dollars, and placed no restriction on when or at what mint the coins would be struck. Meeker's Oregon Trail Memorial Association (OTMA) had tens of thousands of pieces struck in 1926 and 1928, and did not sell them all. Nevertheless, most years between 1933 and 1939, it had small quantities of the half dollar coined, in some years from all three operating mints to produce mintmarked varieties, and raised prices considerably.

Collectors complained that some of the issues were controlled by coin dealers, and individual collectors had to pay high prices. Public protests followed, and in 1939 Congress ended the series. Despite the complaints, the OTMA had difficulty in selling the coins, and they remained available from the OTMA's successor organization as late as 1953. Just over 260,000 of the 6,000,000 authorized coins were struck, of which about 60,000 were melted. The US commemorative coin struck over the longest period, the Oregon Trail Memorial half dollar has been widely praised for its design.

== Background ==
In the middle years of the 19th century, before the completion of the transcontinental railroad in 1869 made travel easier, hundreds of thousands of people journeyed along the Oregon Trail to settle the Far West of the United States. Not all who began the journey reached their destination as there was much suffering and death along the way—by one estimate, 20,000 people lie in unmarked graves.

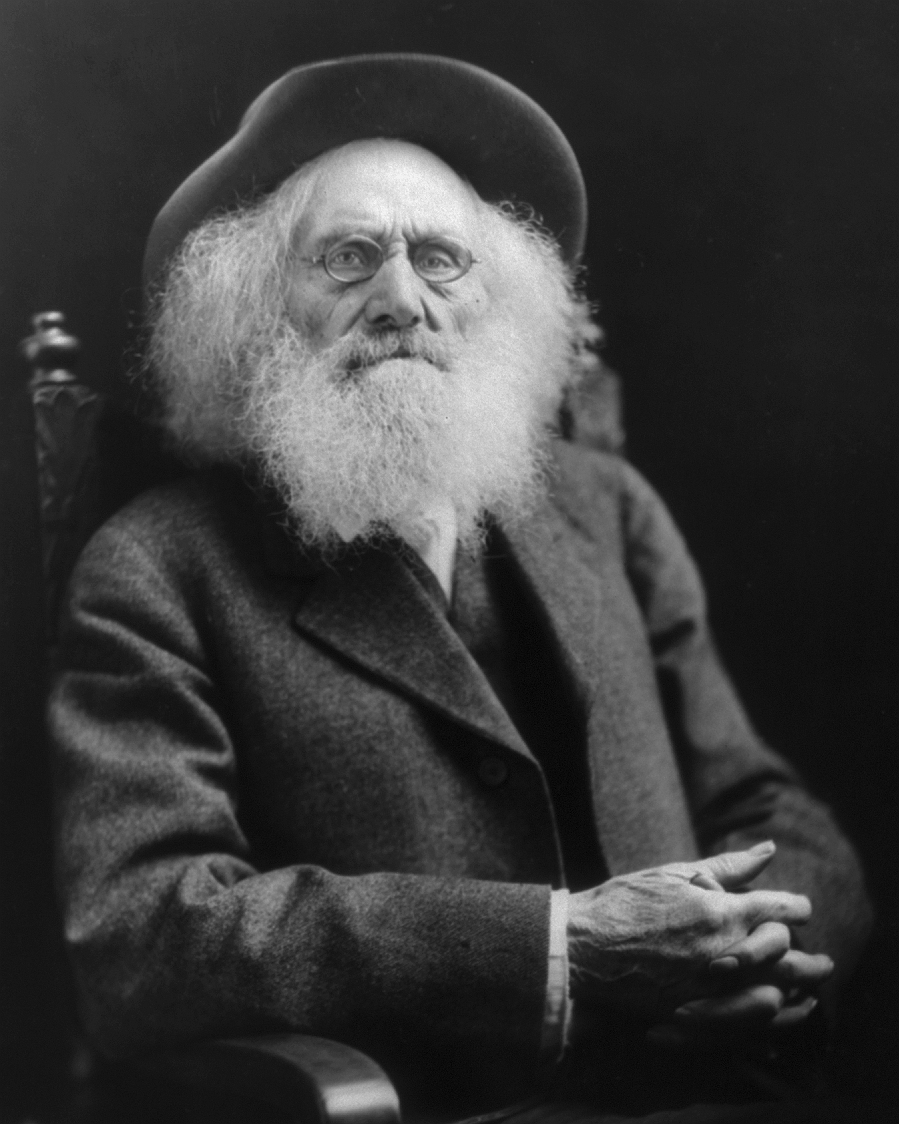
Ezra Meeker in 1921 at age 90

Ohio-born farmer Ezra Meeker (1830–1928) traveled the Oregon Trail in 1852; he and his young wife and infant child went by ox-drawn wagon from Iowa to Oregon Territory. In his old age, he came to believe that the Oregon Trail, and the sacrifice of those who had died along it, were being forgotten. Amid considerable publicity as one of the last survivors of the pioneers who had blazed the way west, Meeker retraced his route along the Trail between 1906 and 1908. The Trail had in some places disappeared, swallowed up by town and farm, and in his journeys, he sought to find where he had passed, seeking to have historical markers erected. He took his ox team and wagon across the nation to publicize his cause, parking his rig in front of the White House where he met President Theodore Roosevelt. In New York, he crossed the Brooklyn Bridge. In 1910, he and his oxen participated in the Tournament of Roses Parade in Pasadena. In the succeeding years, he traveled the route by oxcart, automobile, and, at age 93 in 1924, airplane, attempting to further his cause, and seeking federal recognition and funding for his efforts.

== Inception ==
The Oregon Trail Memorial half dollar stemmed from various efforts by Idahoans who favored the preservation of the site of Fort Hall, an important way station on the Trail. The idea was sparked by the issuance of the 1925 Stone Mountain Memorial half dollar, which caused Mabel Murphy, wife of an Idaho newspaperman, to propose to her husband the striking of an Oregon Trail coin, the profits from which could be used for historic preservation. Her husband, D.T. Murphy, on April 16, 1925, dutifully published an editorial, "Oregon Trail Covered Wagon Half Dollars" in the Idaho State Journal. Mrs. Murphy would not live to see the coin issued, dying November 30, 1925, of tuberculosis.

The idea for the coin was brought up again when civic activists in Pocatello, Idaho, led by Dr. Minnie Howard, sought ideas for funding a monument on the site of Fort Hall. Insurance salesman F.C. McGowan displayed a Stone Mountain piece, "Yes. Coinage. Like this!" Howard and her colleagues pursued the idea. Meeker did as well once he heard of it, forming the Oregon Trail Memorial Association, ("OTMA" or "the Association") a national organization, which could also receive the half dollars, and sell them at a profit.

An act to authorize the coinage of 50-cent pieces in commemoration of the heroism of the fathers and mothers who traversed the Oregon Trail to the far West with great hardship, daring, and loss of life, which not only resulted in adding new states to the Union but earned a well-deserved and imperishable fame for the pioneers; to honor the twenty thousand dead that lie buried in unknown graves along two thousand miles of that great highway of history; to rescue the various important points along the old trail from oblivion; and to commemorate by suitable monuments, memorial or otherwise, the tragic events associated with that emigration—erecting them either along the trail itself or elsewhere, in localities appropriate for the purpose, including the city of Washington.

— Preamble of the act authorizing the Oregon Trail Memorial half dollar

By 1925, Congress was reluctant to authorize more commemorative coins; twelve pieces had been issued between 1920 and 1925, and many legislators felt that coins were being allowed that "commemorate[d] events of local and not national interest". The entire mintages of commemoratives were sold at face value to the sponsoring organizations designated in the authorizing acts. These groups then sold the coins to the public at a premium, thus raising money for causes that Congress had deemed worthy. Made cautious by a series of unsuccessful issues, Congress rejected a number of proposals for special coins in early 1926. Among these were pieces to honor the completion of the Lincoln and Victory Highways, and a proposal to commemorate the centennial of the birth of American composer Stephen Foster.

The bill authorizing the Oregon Trail Memorial half dollar was first introduced in the House of Representatives on January 25, 1926, by Washington Congressman John Franklin Miller, who had previously been mayor of Seattle. Meeker was living in Seattle while Miller was mayor, having moved from his previous home in Puyallup. According to local historian Bert Webber in his 1986 monograph on the coin, "there is little doubt that Mr. Miller was influenced to propose this coin by Ezra Meeker." A hearing was held before the House Coinage Committee on March 3; Meeker testified. The bill was reported favorably, and then passed by the full House on April 5, 1926. The bill was not opposed in the House of Representatives, though one member, Michigan Congressman Louis Cramton, asked several questions before it passed by unanimous consent. According to an October 2013 article in The Numismatist, "Congress was no match for Meeker".

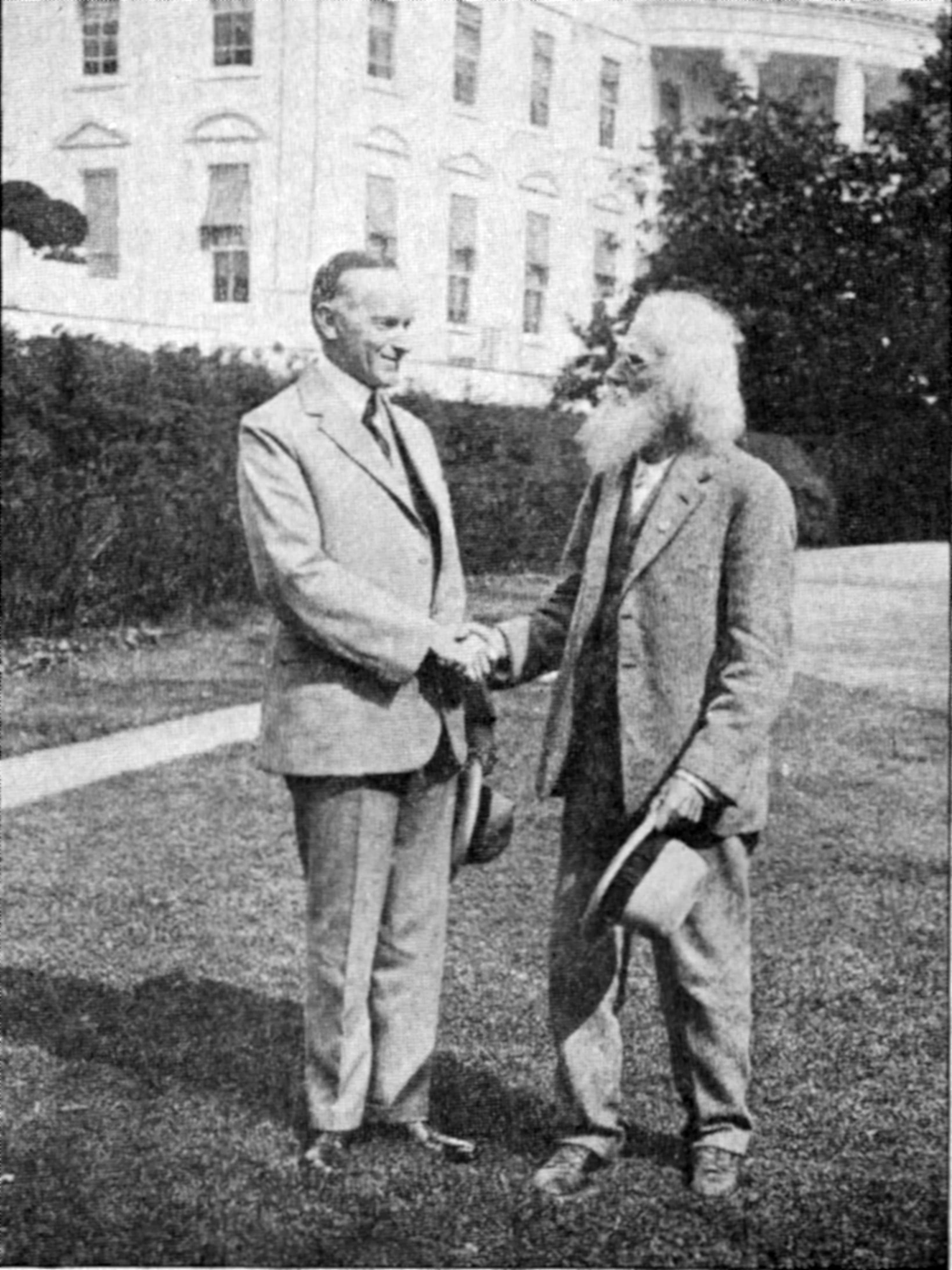
Meeker with President Calvin Coolidge

On April 26, 1926, the 95-year-old Meeker appeared before the Senate's Committee on Banking and Currency. Treasury Secretary Andrew W. Mellon had filed a letter opposing commemorative coin issues, except those of national importance. Meeker, in his testimony, argued that the Trail issue would be of such importance. The OTMA board considered whether to seek amendment of the bill to the alternative suggested by Mellon, a commemorative medal. In part because of Howard's urging, they decided to stay with the coin. The bill for the half dollar was reported without recommendation, but was passed by the Senate on May 10. Meeker met with President Calvin Coolidge to ensure it would be signed, which it was on May 17, 1926, as Public Law 325, authorizing the issuance of up to 6,000,000 half dollars. President Calvin Coolidge signed the bill on the White House lawn; Meeker was present at the signing ceremony and was photographed shaking hands with President Coolidge.

The bill required that the Association pay for the half dollars at par, and that the dies and other costs of preparation not be at the expense of the United States. The figure of six million was the largest in American commemorative history, exceeding the five million for the Stone Mountain issue. Congress placed no restriction on which mint should strike the coins, and did not put a time limit on the authorization. According to numismatists Anthony Swiatek and Walter Breen in their encyclopedia of US commemoratives, the bill passed "possibly because the stated purpose was nationalistic rather than obscurely local". Coin dealer and author Q. David Bowers states that "on the surface the motivation seemed to be good enough ... doubtless many American citizens had family ties to the famous migration".

== Preparation ==
Meeker wanted the new half dollars struck as quickly as possible; he was planning another journey west on the Trail, and wanted to be able to sell the coins along the way. The Association initially contacted Chester Beach, credited with the design of the 1923 Monroe Doctrine Centennial half dollar, to sculpt the new coin, but he was unavailable, though he prepared sketches.

The OTMA tried to reach agreement with Gutzon Borglum, designer of the Stone Mountain piece, but he wanted too much money and time. Ulric Stonewall Jackson Dunbar, who had played a minor role in the Columbian half dollar of 1892–93, was willing, but lacked the national reputation the Association felt the coin's sculptor needed. After receiving suggestions from the American Numismatic Society, the Association turned to the husband-and-wife team of James Earle Fraser and Laura Gardin Fraser. James Fraser had designed the Buffalo nickel; Laura Gardin Fraser had created several commemorative coins, including the Grant Centennial dollar and half dollar. It chose the Frasers at the urging of Minnie Howard, who felt that James Fraser's work dealt with the West, and might make manifest, in his coin design, the importance of the migration by covered wagon. The Association determined upon a design concept of a map showing the Oregon Trail on one side, and on the other a man leading an ox-drawn wagon, with his wife and infant child riding. Although he is not formally commemorated by the coin, the man was meant to be Meeker, and the wagon was based on a photograph of the one he took east in 1906.

== Design ==
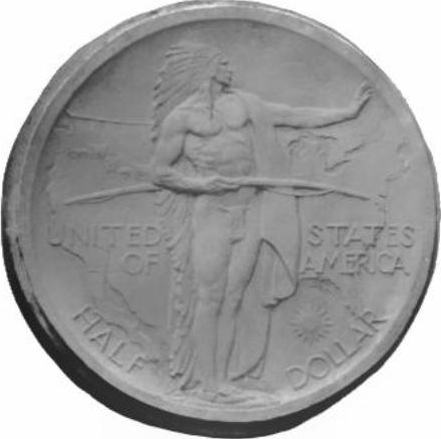
Laura Fraser's plaster models

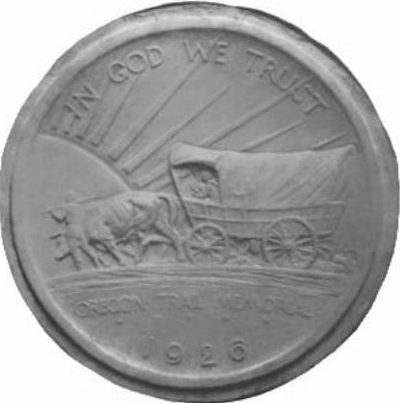

James Fraser designed the wagon side (Note: Which side is the obverse and which the reverse is a matter of dispute. The Frasers considered the Indian side the obverse; the Mint considered the wagon side, with the date, to be the obverse. See Bowers, p. 88. Accordingly, those terms are avoided in this article.) while Laura Fraser designed the Indian side and converted both into relief models. Meeker pestered Laura Fraser to complete the modeling, as he wanted the half dollars available for sale at an upcoming event. She completed the work by July 30, 1926, when she wrote to enquire where she should send the designs for endorsement by the Commission of Fine Arts. This body since 1921 had been tasked with advising the Secretary of the Treasury on coinage design. She sent photographs of her models to the commission's offices. On August 5, 1926, commission chairman Charles Moore responded enthusiastically, informing her that not only had the commission endorsed the designs, but they were having the prints framed for their meeting room. To save time, the hubs from which coinage dies could be prepared were made by the Medallic Art Company of New York, which had made reductions from plaster models to hubs for several commemorative issues. The resulting hubs were sent to the Philadelphia Mint, where working dies for the issue were made. A compass rose on the Indian side, included in Laura Fraser's models, does not appear on the issued coin, though the reason for the change is not known.

The wagon side designed by James Fraser depicts a Conestoga wagon drawn by two oxen, heading into an extremely large setting sun, with resplendent rays. The designers' initials appear behind the wagon; five stars appear below the vehicle, though what they represent is uncertain. Swiatek and Breen suggested that they represent five states and territories through which pioneers would have passed.

The Indian side designed by Laura Fraser features a dramatically rendered Native American, standing erect with outstretched arm in what Vermeule describes as a gesture of peace. The Indian was added by the Frasers to the original map design concept endorsed by the OTMA. Swiatek and Breen noted that the Indian's "position has been irreverently compared to that of a traffic policeman demanding 'Halt!' " Such statements were made from the time of issue; The Numismatist in November 1926 stated that the Indian's left hand "is upraised as if warning the people of the East of the perils and hardship of the Trail". Meeker's 1928 obituary in The New York Times averred that the Indian was "standing with hands upraised to stop the white man's progress westward". The Native American wears a headdress, has a blanket and bow, and is superimposed on a map of the United States, with a line of Conestoga wagons heading west. The design is carried to the rim of the coin; Hudson Bay is visible in the upper right.

The Frasers' design for the half dollar has been widely admired. Swiatek and Breen deemed the issue "one of the greatest artistic triumphs ever to be released by the Mint". Numismatic historian Don Taxay called the coin "the most beautiful as well as the most truly 'American' U.S. coin. It testifies to the fact that authentic genius, even when trammeled by the necessities of a modern, mechanical mint, can transform our coinage into a work of art."

== Production ==
=== Initial release ===
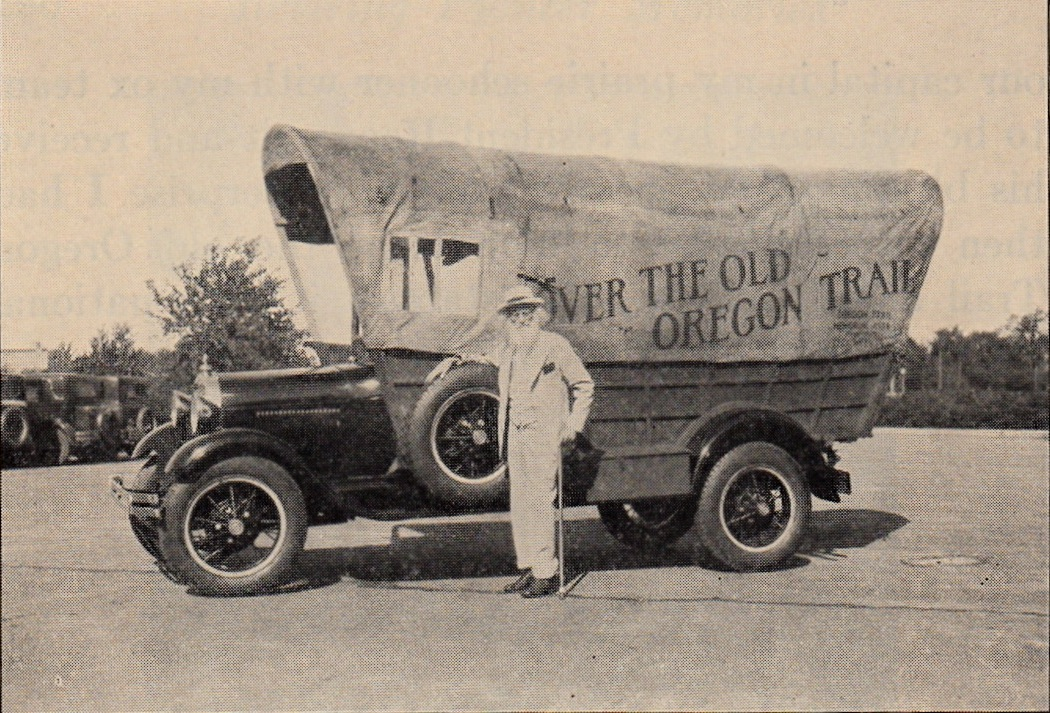
Ezra Meeker, Detroit, November 1928

According to Webber, "during the final stages of manufacture, [Meeker] kept heckling the mint to 'hurry up' ". The Philadelphia Mint struck 48,000 pieces in September 1926, plus 30 reserved for inspection by the 1927 United States Assay Commission. Meeker peddled them along his route at $1 each. The difference between the face value and the sale price was to pay the cost for historical markers along the Trail, and to renovate the Whitman Mission in Washington state. The 1926 piece was later dubbed by the Association the "Ezra Meeker Issue". The first piece struck was presented to Meeker; its whereabouts are not known, while the second, presented to Howard, rests in the Idaho State Historical Museum.

With the initial quantity committed (75 pieces were returned to the mint, most likely because they were damaged or misstruck), the Association requested that more pieces be produced. A hundred thousand were coined at the San Francisco Mint in October and November, bearing the mint mark S (1926-S). The Oregon Trail Memorial half dollar thus became the first commemorative coin struck at multiple mints; Bowers notes that this set "a precedent which would be expanded and abused in the years to come". According to Swiatek and Breen, "the Association ... [was] expecting that the collectors who bought 1926 Philadelphia coins would turn out in similar or greater numbers for the second variety". Although a few thousand quickly sold, the market for the half dollars proved saturated, and tens of thousands remained at the mint pending payment. On December 29, 1926, Meeker celebrated his 96th birthday in New York; he was presented with 96 Oregon Trail Memorial half dollars by the Association.

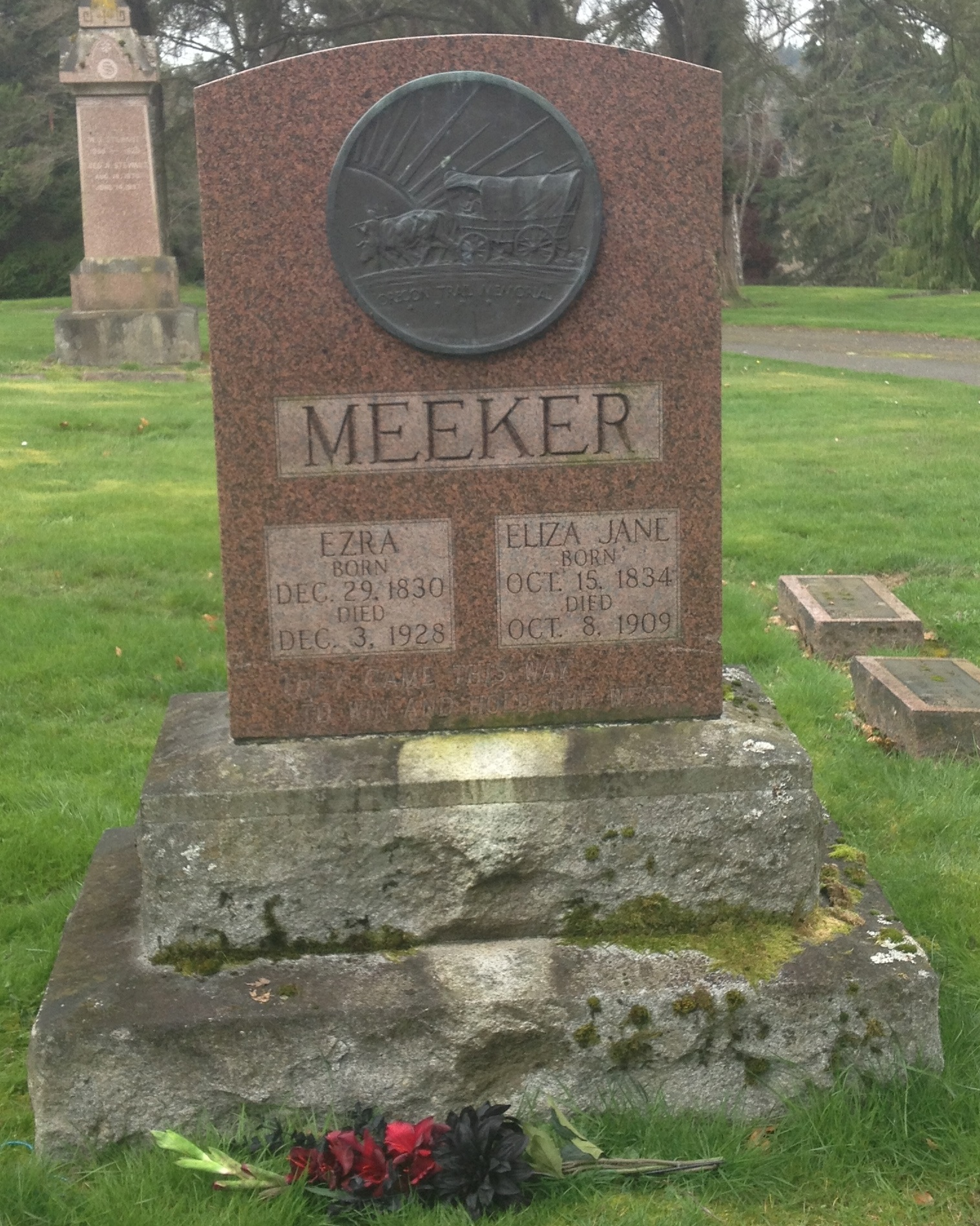
Ezra Meeker's grave, Puyallup, Washington

Despite the many unsold 1926-S half dollars still in the government's hands, the Association sought the issuance of 1927-dated half dollars; this was refused by the Treasury Department (of which the Bureau of the Mint was a part) due to the backlog. In 1928, 50,000 more were struck at the Philadelphia Mint. Meeker continued his exploits: he was presented with 97 coins on his birthday in December 1927 by the Association and brought his half dollars to the visitor's gallery of the New York Stock Exchange, though he was refused permission to go onto the floor. In April 1928, Meeker wrote to the American Numismatic Association, urging its coin-collecting members to purchase both the 1926 and 1926-S pieces. Nevertheless, although Meeker organized a national campaign to sell the coins, the OTMA lost $10,000 by his efforts, due to office and other expenses. "The aged pioneer did not appear to be that good with money".

Meeker was given a truck chassis and money to modify it into a wagon-topped vehicle by Henry Ford in 1928 for yet another Trail trip. Ford offered to make the vehicle more comfortable for Meeker if he brought it to the Ford factory in Dearborn, Michigan. Accordingly, when he left New York in August 1928 on another journey, planning to sell half dollars along the way, he headed directly for Michigan. He arrived ill, and was hospitalized, almost dying there. He was able to return home, disgruntled at having missed voting in the election (he supported the successful Republican candidate, Secretary of Commerce Herbert Hoover, for president) for the first time since 1853. At his home in Washington state, Meeker again became ill in November, and died December 3, 1928, aged 97. He was buried in a cemetery in Puyallup, a place he had helped settle. Meeker's headstone bears a plaque reproducing the wagon side of the half dollar.

=== Reissue ===
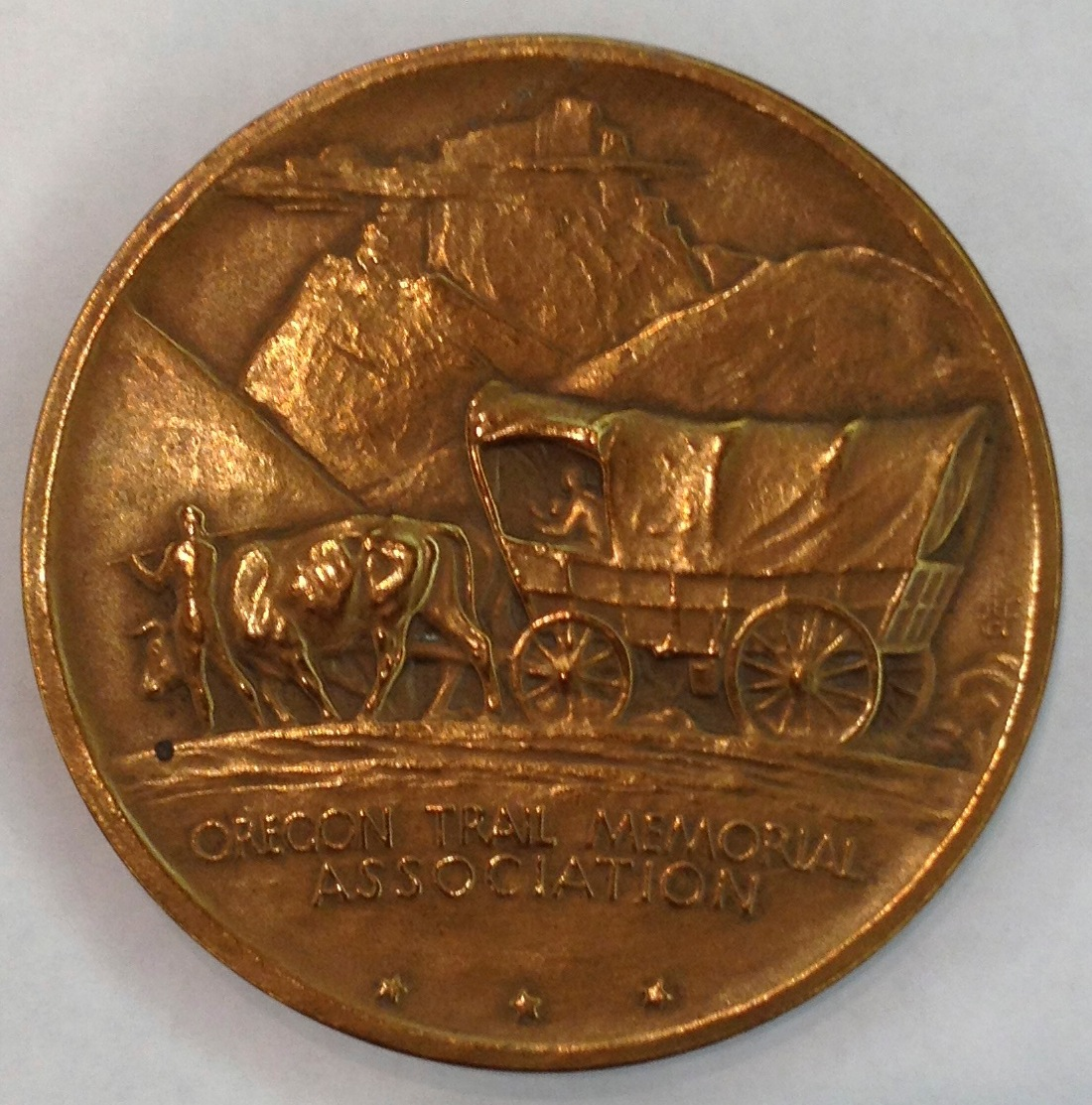
Medal of the Oregon Trail Memorial Association, presented to its second and last president, Howard R. Driggs

After Meeker's death, the OTMA selected Howard R. Driggs, a professor of English education at New York University as his successor, and elected a new board of directors, which worked to clear the debt Meeker had accrued. Coins on hand continued to be sold. It was able to persuade President Hoover to proclaim the Covered Wagon Centennial in 1930, the hundredth anniversary both of Meeker's birth and of the first wagon train leaving St. Louis for the Oregon Country. One means of selling coins the Association devised was a campus-wide drive at Yale University, alma mater of Association executive director Lorne W. Buckley, in October 1930 to raise money for Trail markers. More than 600 coins were sold.

Most 1928 Oregon Trail Memorial half dollars remained in the hands of the Treasury for several years after their striking, though the Association purchased an estimated 1,000 for sale to the public. This impoundment by the government generated interest in the coin collecting community—several letters to the editor appeared in The Numismatist, enquiring as to the coins' fate. One collector followed up with the Philadelphia Mint; Acting Superintendent Fred H. Chaffin replied that the coins were being held there for the Association, and were dated 1928. The OTMA had a financial crisis in 1931, and was planning to close its doors, but operations continued, with headquarters moved from its Manhattan office to Driggs's home in Bayside, Queens. The Association marketed the 1928 coins as the "Jedediah Smith Issue".

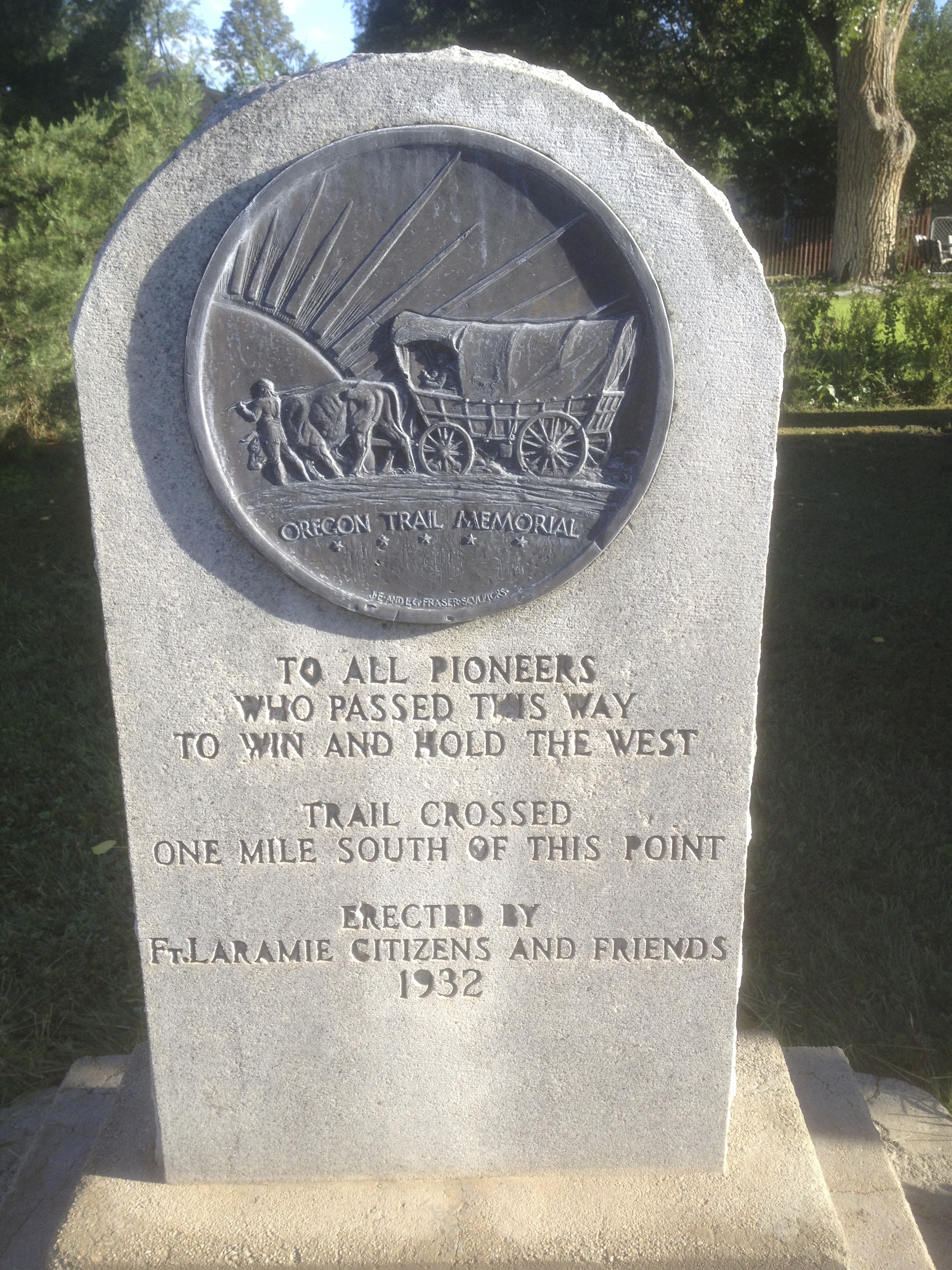
Oregon Trail memorial, Fort Laramie, Wyoming

In early 1933, Driggs sought the issuance of more half dollars on behalf of the OTMA, writing to the acting Mint Director, Mary Margaret O'Reilly. and then to Treasury Secretary William H. Woodin. Driggs wanted 5,000 of the 1928 and 5,000 new half dollars struck at Denver (1933-D), proposing to exchange 10,000 half dollars dated 1926. All the coins held by the government, including those acquired by the exchange, were to be melted. This was approved, and the pieces were duly struck at the Denver Mint, the first commemorative coins ever struck at Denver.

The Association had turned to the Scott Stamp and Coin Company of New York to market the coins. Scott was able to sell some of the 1928 half dollars. These actions have been interpreted negatively by numismatic scholars: Q. David Bowers alleges that Scott's representative, Wayte Raymond, proposed melting most of the issue to create an artificial scarcity, and that the company "desired to capitalize on the gullibility of collectors and their need to complete sets by having more varieties coined. Scott figured that if additional Oregon Trail half dollars could be minted with the date 1933 they could be sold effectively at the Century of Progress Exposition held that year in Chicago." Swiatek and Breen noted, "through God only knows what manner of political manipulation, the Oregon Trail Memorial Association managed to obtain approval of a new 1933 Denver issue" for sale at the exposition.

A total of 5,250 of the 1933-D were struck, of which approximately five were reserved for the Assay Commission and 242 were eventually returned for melting. Bowers believes that the returned pieces were likely defective, rather than unsold. The Association dubbed the 1933-D the "Century of Progress Exposition Issue"; both the 1928 and the 1933-D half dollars were sold for $2 each. However, the 1928 could be obtained for $1.75 by anyone who had recently bought two or more of the 1926 issues, and could be purchased for as little as $1.10 each by purchasing 10 of the 1926-dated coins.

With the relative success of the 1933-D issue, the Association ordered 7,000 more in 1934, also struck at Denver. These were dubbed the "Fort Hall, Fort Laramie and Jason Lee Issue" and were also sold by Scott, for $2. These also were not paid for by the OTMA, but were an exchange for 1926-S half dollars—the distribution figure of 83,055 for the 1926-S equals 100,000 for the OTMA plus 55 assay pieces minus 17,000 returned in exchange for the 1933-D and 1934-D pieces.

The resurrected Oregon Trail issue became controversial in the collecting community, with a large number of coin clubs passing resolutions against the reissues; the president of the American Numismatic Association called for commemorative coins to be sold only by the Mint, not by private organizations. Driggs protested against the resolutions, copies of which were sent to federal authorities. Nevertheless, the 1935-S pieces he had requested of the Mint, and dies for which were prepared, were never struck, perhaps because of the indignation of collectors. Other reasons have been postulated for the lack of an issue in 1935: in a 1937 monograph quoted by Bowers, early coin dealer B. Max Mehl speculated that it took Scott two years to dispose of the 1934-D pieces.

=== Final issues and termination ===
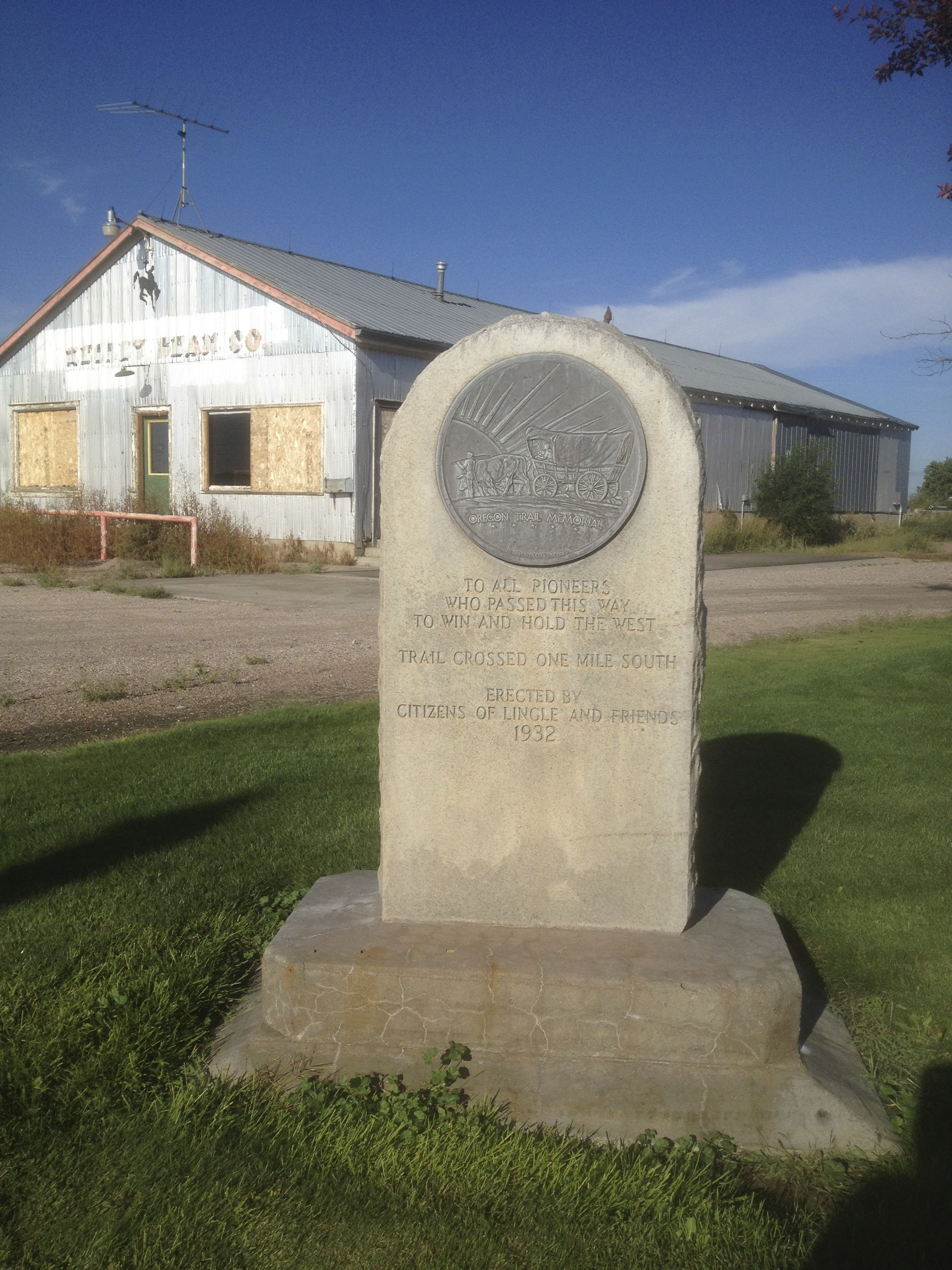
Oregon Trail memorial, Lingle, Wyoming

Beginning in 1934, organizations and individuals saw small-mintage commemoratives, struck at multiple mints over the course of years, as an opportunity for profit. Congress authorized several issues in 1934, including the Texas Centennial half dollar, meant to honor the centennial of Texas Independence in 1936, but struck from 1934 to 1938, after 1934 at all three mints each year. More new commemoratives followed in 1935, and over 20 in 1936. These issues included the Cincinnati Musical Center half dollar, issued to commemorate the 50th anniversary of Cincinnati as a center of music, although nothing out of the ordinary is known to have taken place in that city's musical life in 1886.

Numismatist Arlie R. Slabaugh, in his volume on US commemorative coins, discussed the marketing practices of the 1930s:

Added to the abuse of reissues was the manner of selling these [the Oregon Trail pieces] and several other later issues of commemoratives. The price was often higher than the dollar per coin usually asked in the past, although most of the commemorative deluge came during the depression years. A few pieces at a higher price would not have been too bad, but on a large number of types, the cost to collectors added up. Then, too, many issues were sold only in sets. Coinage was generally small and sold out in only a few days. Speculation was rife—original cost was low to what it might be a short time later if you unfortunately missed having your order filled ... collectors who had not managed to obtain single specimens from the original source were forced to buy it at higher and higher prices from speculators—it soon became a regular round robin of higher and higher prices.

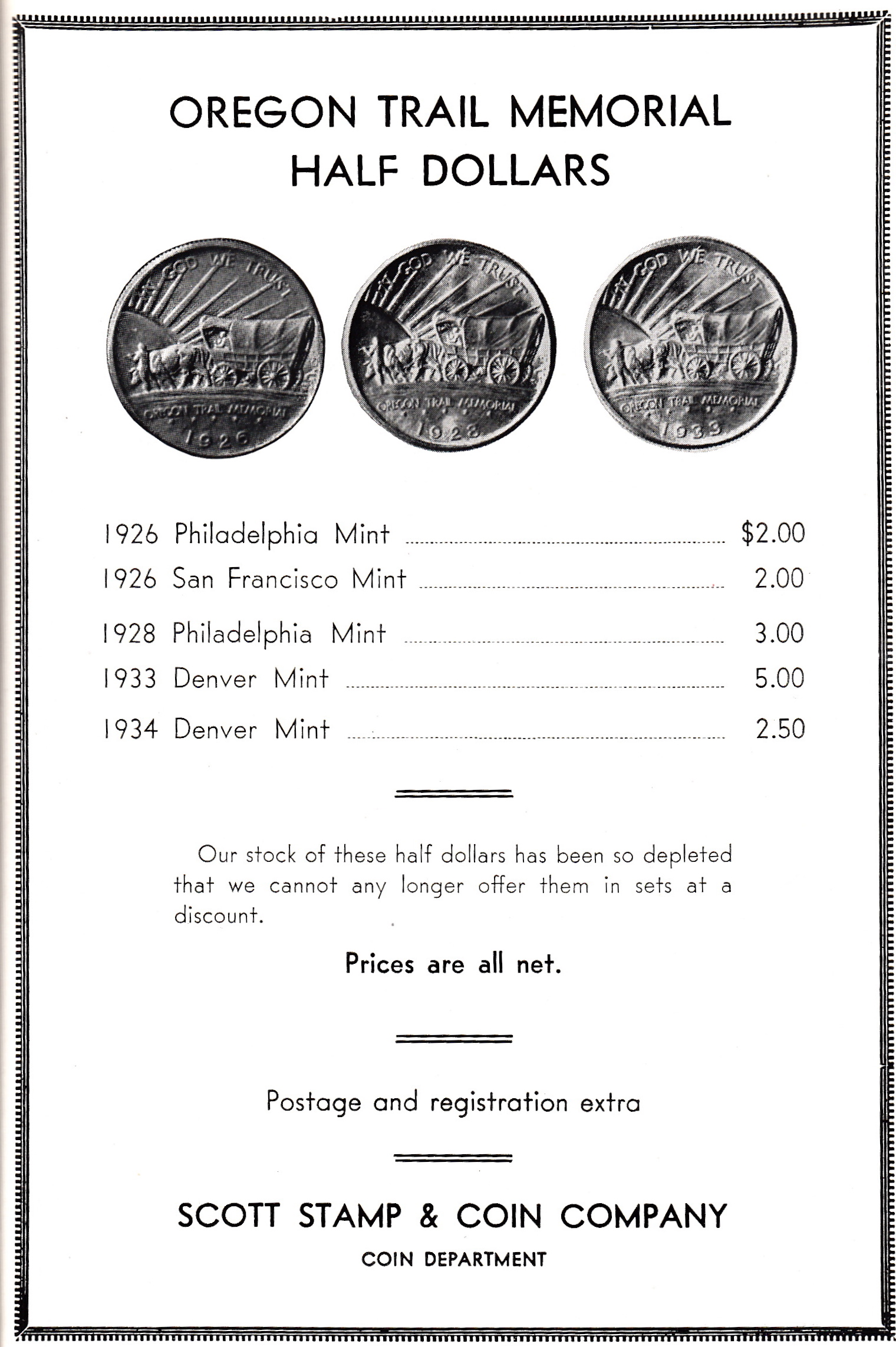
Scott advertisement, February 1936

On December 30, 1935, Driggs wrote to O'Reilly, who with the appointment of Nellie Tayloe Ross as Mint Director had resumed her position as Assistant Mint Director, seeking the issuance of 5,000 Oregon Trail coins to be struck at San Francisco (1936-S) to celebrate the centennial of the arrival of missionary Marcus Whitman and his wife in the Walla Walla Valley. O'Reilly and other officials did not immediately answer and Driggs wrote again in March 1936, Chaffin, again acting superintendent at Philadelphia, responded that the dies had been prepared and sent to San Francisco. The coins were sent at Driggs' request to Scott's in New York. In May, Driggs asked that 10,000 more be struck at Philadelphia, and this was done. These were sold at the height of the commemorative coin boom. Some of the 1936 and 1936-S pieces were sold by Scott, others by the Association through a New York City mail drop, in either case at an initial price of $1.60 per half dollar. Six each of the 1936 and 1936-S were struck in addition to the requested quantities, for assay.

In June 1936, Herbert G. West, head of the Whitman Centennial Celebration, wrote to Driggs informing him that his group had sought and failed to gain (unusually for 1936) a commemorative half dollar to finance its activities. West wanted Driggs to order a special issue of the Oregon Trail commemorative for the Whitman organization to sell. Driggs was non-committal, first telling West that he hoped they might still be successful in gaining their own half dollar, and then that a special issue would be difficult to get as the mints had shut down for the summer. He eventually agreed to give the Whitman group a thousand 1936-S half dollars, on condition they not be sold for less than $1.60 so as not to undercut the OTMA's sales efforts. In fact, Driggs suggested a sale price of $2, which was what the Whitman organization sold them for. These were dubbed the "Whitman Centennial Issue", or the "Whitman Mission Issue". Most of the 1936 pieces struck at Philadelphia were sold by the means of a mailing to Scott's customer list. Some portion of each of the issues between 1933 and 1937 were reserved for sale by patriotic organizations.

The 1937 issue was distributed only by the Association as the deal with Scott had been ended. A total of 12,000 pieces (plus eight for the Assay Commission) were struck at Denver, and were sold at $1.60. No special name was given to the issue. Coin dealer Mehl wondered in 1937, "the 1936 Philadelphia Mint coin is now retailing at $5 and the San Francisco Mint at $10. Where will this thing stop? I don't know."

Senator Francis T. Maloney: "Is there any limitation of time on these issues?"

Lyman W. Hoffecker (legislative committee chairman, American Numismatic Association): "No, sir. They can coin them on for the next 100 years unless there is some legislation to stop it."

...

Senator Alva B. Adams: "Then, within some reasonable limits, they are permitted to get a part of their coins from one mint, and a part from another mint, and a part from the third mint; and they can get a part of them dated in 1934, and a part dated in 1935, and a part dated in 1936?"

Mr. Hoffecker: "Yes, sir."

— Hearing before the Senate Committee on Banking and Currency, March 11, 1936

The 1938 coins, again without a special name, were struck at all three mints, the first time that had been done for the Oregon Trail coins in one year. Six thousand (plus pieces for the Assay Commission) were struck at each mint, and the issue was sold in sets of three, for $6.25. The same practice was followed in 1939, but the price was raised to $7.50 a set and the mintage reduced to 3,000 coins, plus the assay pieces. According to Swiatek and Breen, these sets were also bought up by speculators, and individual collectors often had to pay double or triple the issue price to secure a set. The coins did not sell out instantly; the OTMA's accounting records reveal that nine months after the 1938 coins were put on sale, the organization still had almost half the issue available. Similarly, by October 1939, the Association had sold only 8,283 half dollars dated that year, less than the 9,000 available for sale. Nevertheless, collectors sent letters of protest to congressmen and to the Treasury Department. On August 5, 1939, Congress acted, passing legislation that put an end to all commemorative issues authorized before March 1939. Swiatek and Breen observed that if Congress had not intervened, "there would probably be Oregon Trail coins dated 1980".

A total of 264,419 Oregon Trail Memorial half dollars were struck, of which approximately 174 were intended for the Assay Commission, and 61,317 were melted. Accordingly, a total of 202,928 were issued to the public. The Oregon Trail Memorial half dollar was the commemorative coin struck for the longest period. According to R.S. Yeoman's 2018 deluxe edition of A Guide Book of United States Coins, the cheapest Oregon Trail coins are the 1926 and 1926-S at $135 in Almost Uncirculated. The 1939 pieces are listed only as a set and in Mint State condition (uncirculated), beginning at $1,350.

== Aftermath ==
The Oregon Trail Memorial Association became part of the newly formed American Pioneer Trails Association (APTA) in 1940, a group meant to be broader in scope than the OTMA. A 1942 joint financial statement of both organizations reveals that it still held 7,212 half dollars. It was selling 1936 and 1937-D half dollars in 1943. A letter to the editor in the September 1943 issue of The Numismatist stated that the group was selling the pieces at $5 to finance stakes made of Oregon wood with which to mark the Trail. The sum of five dollars, which included membership, paid for a coin at a time, the letter noted, when the pieces were selling at $1.50 from dealers. (Note: Advertisements in the same issue bear that out. On page 742, a dealer named O. Fred Koch of Cincinnati was selling 1936 half dollars for $1.40 and 1937-D pieces for $1.50. The 1936-S was $5.00, and the set of three from 1938 was $6.50; the 1939 set was $20.)

Minnie Howard was still in 1947 trying to secure the site of Fort Hall, and as part of that effort got Idaho Senator Henry Dworshak to introduce legislation allowing the issuance of more Oregon Trail half dollars to benefit Howard's Idaho organization. No sooner had he done so, on February 26, than President Harry Truman announced his opposition to various coin bills that had been introduced. Acting Treasury Secretary E.F. Foley wrote in opposition, tracing the history between the OTMA and the Treasury Department, "Coins were ordered to be minted and left in the mints". The Banking Committee opposed the bill, and it failed. According to a November 2014 article in The Numismatist, "With the efforts in the 1940s, the Oregon Trail half dollar, having seen its sunrise in Pocatello, met its sunset there as well."

Driggs led the APTA until his death at age 89 in 1963, but it became less active in his final years. He retained at least some half dollars, notifying the Mint in 1953 that the APTA was the successor to the OTMA, and still had half dollars for sale. After his death, over fifty Oregon Trail half dollars were found among his effects. Other groups have carried the APTA's missions of Trail preservation and the building of monuments. In 1963, two years before Howard's death, the City of Pocatello erected a replica of Fort Hall in a park. The actual site, however, remains undeveloped, with an inconspicuous marker.

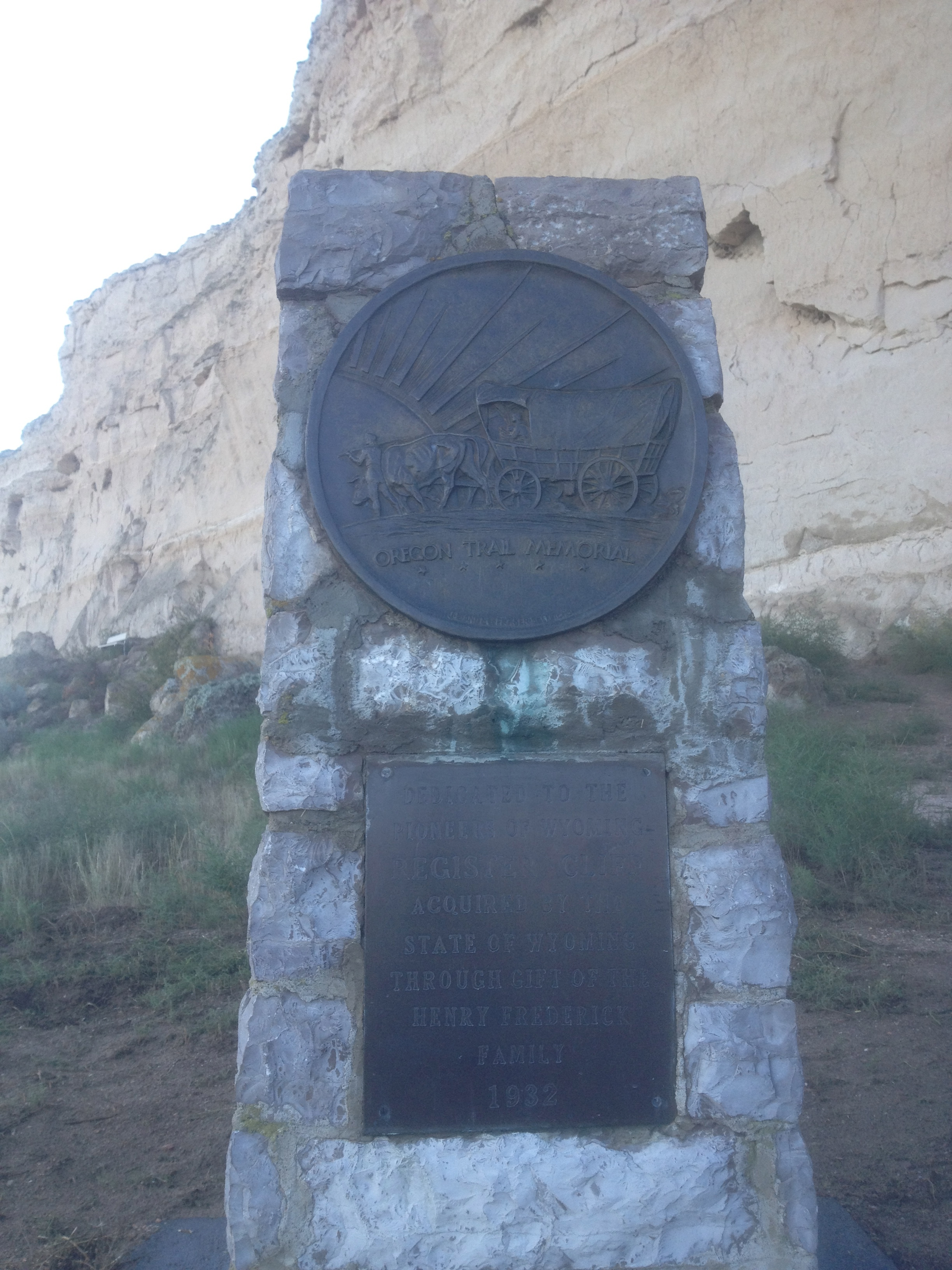
An Oregon Trail memorial at Register Cliff, Wyoming, reproducing the coin's design

No commemorative coins were struck between 1939 and 1945. When authorizations resumed after the war, issues in honor of Booker T. Washington and George Washington Carver were sold, in some years, in low-mintage sets of coins from all three mints. After 1954, when the last such pieces were struck, the Treasury Department did not again support a non-circulating commemorative until 1982, when a half dollar in honor of the 250th anniversary of the birth of George Washington was issued. The Washington half dollar was distributed by the Mint, with profits applied to the reduction of the national debt. Bowers writes, "this time around, [striking of commemorative coins] would not be on behalf of private or local interests".

In the past, numismatic writers have described the Association and its activities harshly. Bowers states that the Oregon Trail coins "are beautiful, but circumstances surrounding their issuance leave much to be desired". Slabaugh noted that "Artistically, this is my favorite commemorative coin. But from an ethical standpoint, it is not." Swiatek and Breen wrote that the Association's "activities in exploiting coin collectors and the general public eventually led to the unpopularity of commemoratives in Congress and ultimately to adamant Treasury Department opposition to any further commemorative issues, no matter how worthy the cause to be memorialized, no matter who represented the sponsoring commissions". According to Bowers, "as far as I know, the financial benefits which provided the reason for issuing the half dollars, 'to rescue the various important points along the old trail from oblivion,' to erect 'suitable monuments, memorial and otherwise,' etc., never came to pass, at least not from money provided by the sale of the coins." (Note: In fact, over 100 memorials were built with coin-derived funds (see The Numismatist & November 2014, p. 38).) These, however, did not have the benefit of examining OTMA records. Following the opening of Driggs's papers for research at Southern Utah University, an October 2013 article in The Numismatist concluded that though many documents, such as the arrangements with Scott's, are missing from his records, what there is "seems consistent with Driggs wanting to use the coins to finance the marking of the Oregon Trail, not to line his own pockets".

== Mintages ==
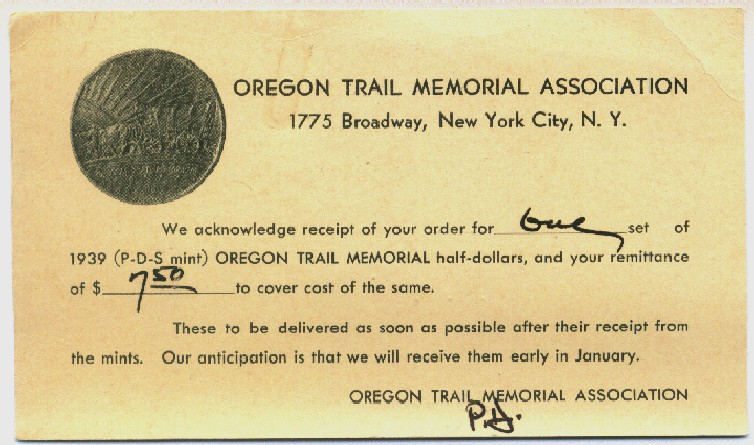
Postal card sent to those successful in ordering the 1939 half dollar set

Date	Mint mark	Mint	Distribution
1926	None	Philadelphia	47,955
1926	S	San Francisco	83,055
1928	None	Philadelphia	6,028
1933	D	Denver	5,008
1934	D	Denver	7,006
1936	None	Philadelphia	10,006
1936	S	San Francisco	5,006
1937	D	Denver	12,008
1938	None	Philadelphia	6,006
1938	D	Denver	6,005
1938	S	San Francisco	6,006
1939	None	Philadelphia	3,004
1939	D	Denver	3,004
1939	S	San Francisco	3,005

A small number of coins from each year and mint were put aside for inspection by the following year's Assay Commission; the above figures include such pieces. This accounts for the variance from the even thousand mintages in 1933 and after.

== See also ==
- Half dollar (United States coin)
- Early United States commemorative coins
- Buffalo nickel, designed in 1913 by James Earle Fraser

== References and bibliography ==
Books

- Bowers, Q. David (2008). A Guide Book of United States Commemorative Coins. Atlanta, Ga.: Whitman Publishing. ISBN 978-0-7948-2256-9.
- Driggs, Howard R.; Meeker, Ezra (1932). Covered-Wagon Centennial and Ox-Team Days. Yonkers, N.Y.: World Book Magazine.
- Slabaugh, Arlie R. (1975). United States Commemorative Coinage (second ed.). Racine, Wis.: Whitman Publishing. ISBN 978-0-307-09377-6.
- Swiatek, Anthony; Breen, Walter (1981). The Encyclopedia of United States Silver & Gold Commemorative Coins, 1892 to 1954. New York: Arco Publishing. ISBN 978-0-668-04765-4.
- Taxay, Don (1967). An Illustrated History of U.S. Commemorative Coinage. New York: Arco Publishing. ISBN 978-0668015363.
- Vermeule, Cornelius (1971). Numismatic Art in America. Cambridge, Mass.: The Belknap Press of Harvard University Press. ISBN 978-0-674-62840-3.
- Webber, Bert (1986). The Oregon Trail Memorial Half-Dollar. Medford, Ore.: Webb Research Group. ISBN 0-936738-16-2.
- Yeoman, R.S. (2018). A Guide Book of United States Coins 2014 (Mega Red 4th ed.). Atlanta, GA: Whitman Publishing, LLC. ISBN 978-0-7948-4580-3.

Other sources

- Bowers, Q. David. "Chapter 8: Silver commemoratives (and clad too), Part 54". Commemorative Coins of the United States: A Complete Encyclopedia.
- Bowers, Q. David. "Chapter 8: Silver commemoratives (and clad too), Part 55". Commemorative Coins of the United States: A Complete Encyclopedia.
- Bowers, Q. David. "Chapter 8: Silver commemoratives (and clad too), Part 56". Commemorative Coins of the United States: A Complete Encyclopedia.
- Bowers, Q. David. "Chapter 8: Silver commemoratives (and clad too), Part 57". Commemorative Coins of the United States: A Complete Encyclopedia.
- Bowers, Q. David. "Chapter 8: Silver commemoratives (and clad too), Part 59". Commemorative Coins of the United States: A Complete Encyclopedia.
- Bowers, Q. David. "Chapter 8: Silver commemoratives (and clad too), Part 60". Commemorative Coins of the United States: A Complete Encyclopedia.
- Bowers, Q. David. "Chapter 8: Silver commemoratives (and clad too), Part 179". Commemorative Coins of the United States: A Complete Encyclopedia.
- Bowers, Q. David. "Chapter 8: Silver commemoratives (and clad too), Part 180". Commemorative Coins of the United States: A Complete Encyclopedia.
- "Ezra Meeker departs on his second round-trip wagon expedition to publicize and map the old Oregon Trail on March 16, 1910". HistoryLink.org.
- "Oregon Trail Memorial Half Dollar". CoinSite. ROKO Design Group. Archived from the original on August 6, 2013.
- Greenbaum, Gary M. (October 2013). "The other side of the Oregon Trail half dollar". The Numismatist. Colorado Springs, Col.: American Numismatic Association: 42–49.
- Greenbaum, Gary M. (November 2014). "Sunrise at Pocatello: Dr. Minnie Howard, Ezra Meeker, and the Oregon Trail half dollar". The Numismatist. Colorado Springs, Col.: American Numismatic Association: 32–38.
- "Memorial coin is unnoticed in Wall Street". The Morning Leader. May 5, 1928.
- "Meeker to motor over Oregon Trail" (PDF). The New York Times. July 11, 1926. (subscription required)
- "Ezra Meeker at 97 finds world good" (PDF). The New York Times. December 30, 1927. (subscription required)
- "Ezra Meeker to hit Oregon Trail again" (PDF). The New York Times. August 4, 1928. (subscription required)
- "Ezra Meeker dies; an ox-team pioneer" (PDF). The New York Times. December 4, 1928. (subscription required)
- "Oregon Trail half dollar". The Numismatist. Colorado Springs, Col.: American Numismatic Association: 614–615. November 1926.
- "The Oregon Trail half dollar of 1928". The Numismatist. Colorado Springs, Col.: American Numismatic Association: 294–295. May 1930.
- Bibler, Stephen H. (September 1943). "Oregon Trail Commemoratives". The Numismatist. Colorado Springs, Col.: American Numismatic Association: 294–295.
- Rossman, Will (August 1998). "Ezra Meeker and the Oregon Trail Commemorative". The Numismatist. Colorado Springs, Col.: American Numismatic Association: 887–890.
- "Commemoratives from 1892–1954". United States Mint. Archived from the original on September 22, 2010.
