= Carla Rossi (entertainer) =

Native American drag performer

- Born: Anthony Hudson
- Occupation: Drag performer

Anthony Hudson, known sometimes as Carla Rossi, is an American artist and writer based in Portland, Oregon.

== Early and personal life ==
Hudson was raised in Keizer, Oregon. They are of Native American and German descent. They are a citizen of the Confederated Tribes of Grand Ronde and a descendant of the Confederated Tribes of Siletz Indians.

They performed with the drama department while attending McNary High School. Hudson graduated from the Pacific Northwest College of Art with a Bachelor of Fine Arts in Intermedia.

== Career ==
=== Intermedia Art ===
In 2013, Hudson created an installation "Queering Portlandia" that was on display in the Installation Space at the Portland Building. The installation was a photo and video booth prompting participants to perform their own interpretation of Portlandia.

In 2018, the exhibit "Me, Myself & It" was on view at the Littman Gallery at Portland State University. The exhibit is a collection of makeup wipes used by Hudson to make prints of their face after performing as Carla Rossi. The exhibit is attributed to both Anthony Hudson and Carla Rossi.

In 2020, the world premiere of Looking for Tiger Lily at Artists Repertory Theatre was postponed due to the COVID-19 pandemic. The play evolved from a solo show of the same name and explores Hudson's journey with identity.

=== Carla Rossi ===
Hudson performs as drag clown Carla Rossi, who Hudson characterizes as a trickster character rather than the traditional drag queen. Rossi has been featured at Seattle PrideFest, the Risk/Reward Festival, the Cascade AIDS Project Auction, and the Hollywood Theatre's Queer Horror series.

Hudson has overseen programming for Hollywood Theatre's Queer Horror series since 2015.

In 2024, they premiered the variety drag show Ask Dr. Carla at PAM CUT's Tomorrow Theater. They also participated in the 2024 Venice Biennale's opening festivities and performed on an art installation by Jeffrey Gibson in the U.S. pavilion. Hudson announced Rossi's retirement in February 2026.

=== Exhibit curation ===
In 2023, Hudson and Felix Furby curated the exhibit "My Father's Father's Sister: Our Ancestor Shimkhin," which was on display at Chachalu Tribal Museum and Cultural Center on the Confederated Tribes of Grand Ronde reservation. The exhibit drew on historical documents and featured Shimkhin, a 19th-century Two-Spirit Atfalati Kalapuya healer. Hudson and Furby received funding from the Native Arts and Cultures Foundation to support the exhibit.

In 2024, Hudson and Furby curated the exhibit "Transgressors," which originated at Chachalu Tribal Museum and Cultural Center. The exhibit consisted of a variety of artwork from various Indigenous queer artists, including Steph Littlebird and Lehuauakea. The exhibit opened at the Museum of Natural and Cultural History in 2025 and will be on view through January 4, 2026.

== Fellowships ==
- National Artist Fellowship (2018) - Native Arts and Cultures Foundation
- Artist in Business Leadership Fellowship (2021) - First Peoples Fund
- Indigenous Place Keeping Artist Fellowship (2022) - Confederated Tribes of Grand Ronde

== See also ==
- Indigenous drag performers
- LGBTQ culture in Portland, Oregon
- List of drag queens
- List of people from Portland, Oregon
