= Louise Shadduck =

American journalist and author (1915–2008)

- Born: October 14, 1915; Coeur d'Alene, Idaho, US
- Died: May 4, 2008 (aged 92)
- Occupations: Journalist; author
- Political party: Republican Party

Louise M. Shadduck (October 14, 1915 – May 4, 2008), nicknamed the "Lioness of Idaho," was an Idaho journalist, political activist, public servant, author, speaker and lobbyist, and the first woman in the United States to serve in a state Governor's executive cabinet level office as a departmental secretary. As Idaho's popular newly appointed Secretary of Commerce and Development, under 24th Governor of Idaho, Robert E. ("Bob") Smylie (1914–2004, served 1955–1967), and supervising a small office of the Department of Commerce and Development, often leading visiting corporate business executives on horseback adventures in the mountains, she stimulated the state's economy to its ten best years of growth. She was also administrative assistant to two governors, a U.S. Senator and a U.S. Representative (congressman).

As a historian, she was known for her ability to remember names and personal stories. The author of five history books, president of the National Federation of Press Women and independent lobbyist in the fields of forestry and human rights, she was one of Idaho's most decorated and celebrated citizens.

== Early life and education ==
Louise Shadduck was born in 1915 in Coeur d'Alene, Idaho, the county seat and largest town of surrounding Kootenai County and region of North Idaho, just south of the Canada–United States border. and raised on a dairy farm in the North Idaho panhandle. Her family had purchased the farm for $700 at the foot of Canfield Mountain, raising vegetables, chickens, goats, and cows. Shadduck drove the family truck as soon as she could reach the pedals, and she and her six brothers took turns driving the family dairy milk truck on its route in the mornings before school. She would perform farm chores and rough-house with her siblings, and also played dolls and helped her mother with the house. She attended Dalton Grade School and secondary school at Coeur d'Alene High School (CDAHS), (founded 1903) in Coeur d'Alene in the early 1930s. At one point winning a journalism contest with a prize of a trip north to Alaska, she wrote for her high school newspaper "The Viking Voice" (current name), and was a cheerleader for the "Vikings" sports teams during the economic hardships of the beginning Great Depression of the 1930s. In 1969, she received an honorary degree from the University of Idaho in Moscow, Idaho.

== Career ==
=== Early career ===
Shortly after graduating high school she was hired as a writer / reporter for the Spokesman-Review of Spokane, Washington, one of the biggest and most influential papers in the Pacific Northwest region, and afterwards for her hometown daily newspaper in Coeur d'Alene, Idaho of the Coeur d'Alene Press. Shadduck was sent to report on the 1944 Republican National Convention in Chicago, Illinois (which nominated New York Governor (and famous New York City district attorney (prosecutor), Thomas E. Dewey (1902–1971), as their candidate for president against long-serving 32nd President and military commander-in-chief during the war of Franklin D. Roosevelt (1882–1945, served 1933–1945). for the Coeur d'Alene Press. At the end of World War II (1939/1941-1945), she founded the Kootenai County Young Republicans organization in the North Idaho panhandle. Gaining recognition in that organization, she rejected attempts by the Republican Party to recruit her, instead sticking for the time being to her talents in journalism. However, when the Coeur d'Alene Press sent her east to Washington, D.C. as a student intern for Idaho's longtime politician, then U.S. Senator Henry Dworshak (1894–1962, served as Representative 1939–1946, as Senator Nov.1946-Jan.1949 / Oct.1949 – July 1962), recruited her for his office, she both wrote stories for the paper back home and also helped the senator on the side. She also joined prominent conservative Republican U.S. Senator Robert A. Taft (1889–1953, served 1939–1953), of Ohio, (nicknamed "Mr. Republican" in the 1940s / 1950s era of the American national political arena) and his inner circle, after being invited after attending a Young Republicans convention in Milwaukee< Wisconsin.

Returning to the state capital of Boise, Idaho, she accepted a job from then 22nd Governor of Idaho, Charles A. ("C.A.") Robbins (1884–1970, served 1947–1951). as his publicity assistant. She was quickly promoted to administrative assistant in the Capitol Governor's office.

She was the first female administrative assistant to an Idaho governor, serving Governor Robins for four years from 1946 until 1950. She left writing for The Press in 1948 but continued to occasionally write and sell freelance stories and columns. The Press in Coeur d'Alene published these stories under her "This and That" by-lined column. She continued in that office with his successor, 23rd Governor Len Jordan (1899–1983, served 1951–1955), for another year until 1952 when again Idaho's then still U.S. Senator Henry Dworshak finally convinced her to come to the federal national capital city of Washington, D.C. and work for him on his staff on Capitol Hill at the United States Capitol. During the 1952 presidential election campaign, Shadduck spoke for Republican Party presidential candidate and former United States Army commanding general in Europe during the earlier Second World War of Dwight D. Eisenhower (1890–1969, served 1953–1961), and his "I Like Ike" themed election campaign, sharing a head table with the retired general and briefly Columbia University president and future 34th president. She spoke in support of his peace-time nuclear policy proposals given in a nationally televised acceptance of his nomination speech at the 1952 Republican National Convention in Chicago.

In 1956 she made a run herself for the United States Congress, in the lower chamber of the U.S. House of Representatives against two-terms incumbent Democratic Party opponent Gracie Pfost (1906–1965) for the First Congressional District of Idaho seat. Representative Pfost, a Democrat had been elected four years earlier in the 1952 general elections, against the Republican "red tide" sweep that election year with candidate General Eisenhower's victory and a parallel majority in both legislative houses of Congress. Now four years later in the 1956 general elections, it was the first time in United States history where both major political parties chose female candidates facing off against each other in a House of Representatives / congressional race, and drew nation-wide attention in the news media. Congresswoman Pfost won a third term by a substantial margin in the First District of Idaho however, with a majority of 60,170 and 55.1% versus Shadduck's 48,174 and 44.9% of the votes cast, and continued serving for the next decade, 1953–1963, as the first woman in Idaho history to represent the state in the halls of Congress in Washington. During this time Shadduck also helped and made appearances for President Eisenhower in his reelection campaign that same year. She spoke from the podium in August 1956, at the Cow Palace arena in San Francisco, California addressing the G.O.P.'s 1956 Republican National Convention which was also televised nation-wide on the three major news networks.

=== State secretary and lobbying ===
In 1958, she was the first woman in the United States to be a state secretary of commerce and development, when Idaho's Governor appointed her to the position Given five employees and a budget of $140,000, soon after losing 45% to 55% to Congresswoman Pfost, Shadduck was asked in 1958 by Idaho's 24th governor, Robert ("Bob") Smylie (1914–2004, served 1955–1967), to take over the state's then struggling Idaho Department of Commerce and Development, giving her a blank slate to do it her way. Under Governor Smylie, she became the first female head of a state executive department when she created and the ran the agency that later became the current Idaho Department of Commerce. With an office in the State House / State Capitol top floor / attic, Shadduck began a strategy of promotion which included back country horseback and fishing trips with business leaders from other states. She brought major Girl Scout and Boy Scout events to the state, implemented development of Farragut State Park and brought other national conventions meetings to Idaho. Her ten-year tenure coincides with Idaho's per capita income level rising to its highest point in the 20th century.

Following the election defeat of Governor Smylie, she became administrative assistant to Idaho's U.S. Representative (congressman) Orval Hansen. After leaving his office, she lobbied for Idaho's forest industries and rewrote the timber tax laws to make it profitable for renewable logging on managed private property. Reacting to the arrival of a racist white supremacist group in northern Idaho, she lobbied effectively for an amendment to the state's malicious harassment laws. That amendment allowed for civil damages to be awarded in cases of malicious harassment and was instrumental in dismantling the supremacist compound. In 1979, she accompanied U.S. Senator Frank Church (1924–1984, served 1957–1981), and others on a major trade delegation to the People's Republic of China (China), where she spoke about and promoted cooperation in forestry issues between the two nations.

=== Writing and later years ===
Shadduck continued to write articles for various Idaho newspapers and publications. In 1966 she was president of Idaho Press Women. From 1971 to 1973 she was president of the National Federation of Press Women and spoke in the State of Israel at the World Association of Women Journalists in a program which also included Prime Minister of Israel, Golda Meir (1898–1978, served 1969–1974).

In May 2008, then Idaho Lieutenant Governor, Jim Risch named her his North Idaho panhandle campaign for his campaign to replace incumbent U.S. Senator Larry Craig.

Shadduck wrote five books, Idaho Sheep King, Doctors with Buggies, Snowshoes and Planes, At the Edge of the Ice, Rodeo Idaho, and Idaho Rodeo! Her final book, about Victor Dessert and titled The House that Victor Built, was published posthumously and fortunately had a publisher's proof version to look over and scan brought to her deathbed at age 92 in 2008.

An amateur artist, she promoted the arts throughout her life. Shadduck had a reputation for never forgetting a name or a person's story. She enjoyed mentoring young people beginning their studies or careers, and her personal friendships are cited as a source of her political influence in Idaho's history. She remained active with full-time speaking engagements until within several months of her death at the age of 92.

== Personal life ==
Shadduck never married, with her great-niece stating in an interview that "it was because no man could keep up with her." In 2005, she organized a family expedition to Enterprise, Oregon and Joseph, Oregon, where her great-grandfather had led a wagon train expedition along the historic Oregon Trail in the mid-19th century. She died in Coeur d'Alene after a long illness. An obituary noted her death published in the Los Angeles Times of Los Angeles, California. Upon her death in 2008, she was survived by ten nieces and nephews.

== Accolades and awards ==
- In 1990, she was chosen as one of the List of 100 "Idahoans who make a difference" by the Idaho Centennial Homecoming Commission.
- Bullard, Mike. Lioness of Idaho: Louise Shadduck and The Power of Polite. (Coeur d'Alene, Idaho: The Samuel Dow,) 2013.
- Silver and Gold Award from University of Idaho at (Moscow, Idaho),1988
- Monongahela Forestry Leadership Award from National Forest Products Association
- Silver Anvil Award from Public Relations Society of America
- Idaho Press Women's Woman of Achievement Award 1967 and 1994
- National Federation of Press Women's President's Award and Hall of Fame
- "Outstanding Idahoan" from the daily newspaper Idaho Statesman (published in the state capital of Boise, Idaho)
- Distinguished Member Trophy from Boise Ad Club
- Idaho Hall of Fame, 1996
- Outstanding Achievement in the Humanities award by the Idaho Humanities Council in 2000
- Esto Perpetua award of the Idaho Historical Society
- Honorary Doctor of Laws degree, University of Idaho (Moscow, Idaho), 1969
- Louise Shadduck Office Building, Idaho Department of Lands
- A bronze bust of Shadduck is among the displays rotated into the Idaho State Capitol (Idaho State House) in Boise.

== Works ==
- Andy Little: Idaho Sheep King. (Caldwell, ID: Caxton Press 1990).
- Doctors with Buggies, Snowshoes and Planes. (Coeur d'Alene, ID: Tamarack, 1993).
- At the Edge of the Ice. (Coeur d'Alene, ID: Tamarack, 1996).
- Rodeo Idaho. (Coeur d'Alene, ID: Tamarack, 2001).
- The House that Victor Built. (Spokane: Walsworth Publishing, 2007)
- Unpublished notes and papers in boxes of Shadduck's personal effects held by the University of Idaho Library in Moscow, Idaho, acquisition numbers ma1995-48 and ma2008-23, includes 27 boxes of unsorted and uncatalogued, personal effects.

== See also ==
- Women in journalism
- List of University of Idaho people

== Primary sources ==
- Carlson, Chis. Medimont Reflections. (Ridenbaugh Press: 2013). Chapter 5 is about the choice of Louise as "Lioness of Idaho".
- Idaho Oral History Center: Typed Transcript of an Oral History Interview with Louise Shadduck Published 1995.
- Wolf-Astrauskus, Marianne. Leadership 1937–2013: The First Forty presidents of the National Federation of Press Women. p. 47.
