= Virginia Driving Hawk Sneve =

American writer

- Born: Virginia Driving Hawk; February 21, 1933 (age 93); South Dakota, United States
- Education: St. Mary's School (Springfield, South Dakota); South Dakota State University
- Spouse: Vance M. Sneve
- Children: 3
- Writing career
- Genres: Historical, children's literature

Virginia Driving Hawk Sneve (born February 21, 1933) is a Native American author, with a focus on children's books about Native Americans.

== Background and family ==
The daughter of James Driving Hawk, an Episcopal priest, and Rose Driving Hawk (née Ross), Virginia was raised on the Rosebud Indian Reservation. She graduated from St. Mary's School for Indian Girls in Springfield, South Dakota and received her bachelor's and master's degrees from South Dakota State University (Brookings) where she met her husband. She has published over twenty books on South Dakota history, aboriginal American history, poetry, fiction, and non-fiction works for children, as well as one about her female ancestors, "Completing the Circle".

Virginia is a member of the Rosebud Sioux Tribe (Sicangu Lakota). She studied journalism at the South Dakota State University. She is the mother of three, grandmother of five, and great-grandmother of two.

== Career ==
It is because of her children that she realized the need for children's books about aboriginal Americans in a contemporary context rather than a "savage" myth of the past. Her husband is from a Norwegian family, so she wrote The Trickster and the Troll to bring together the two cultures of her children, for them and for her grandchildren. The story follows the Lakota trickster Iktomi and a Norwegian house troll across the plains as they search for the troll's lost family.

Sneve was an English language teacher and counselor in several public schools, editor at the Brevet Press in Sioux Falls, South Dakota, and she has been a member of several organizations. She and her husband also ran an antiques business before retiring. She still writes today; her latest book is a chapter book for older children, "The Summer of the Bone Horses," published in 2025. Her book, "The Christmas Coat: Memories of My Sioux Childhood," published in 2011, was named in Smithsonian Magazine's Best Children's Books of 2011. She still resides in South Dakota.

== Works ==
- That They May Have Life, The Episcopal Church in South Dakota 1850-1976 (1977)
- The Twelve Moons (Houghton Mifflin Reading Series) (1977)
- South Dakota Geographic Names, Sioux Falls, South Dakota: Brevet Press (1973)
- Betrayed (1974)
- When Thunders Spoke (1974) illustrated by Oren Lyons
- Dancing Teepees: Poems of American Indian Youth (1989)
- The Chichi Hoohoo Bogeyman (1993)
- Completing the Circle (1995)
- The Hopis: A First Americans Book (1995) illustrated by Ronald Himler
- The Cherokees (1996)
- The Cheyennes (1996)
- The Apaches (1997)
- Grandpa Was a Cowboy and an Indian & Other Stories (2000)
- Lana's Lakota Moons (2007)
- The Christmas Coat: Memories of My Sioux Childhood (2011) illustrated by Ellen Beier
- ‘’ Sioux Women Traditionally Sacred’’ (2016)
- The Summer of the Bone Horses: A Chapter Book

(2025) illustrated by Steph Littlebird

- The Medicine Bag (1975)
- Jimmy Yellow Hawk (1972) illustrated by Oren Lyons

== Prizes ==
- National Humanities Medal, 2000
- Human Rights Award, South Dakota State Counselors Association, 1996
- Author-Illustrator Human and Civil Rights Award, 1996
- Spirit of Crazy Horse Award, 1996
- South Dakota Education Association Human Services Award, 1994
- North American Indian Prose Award, University of Nebraska Press, 1992
- Woman of Achievement, National Federation of Press Women, 1975
