= Marj Carpenter =

American minister (1926–2020)

- Born: August 23, 1926
- Died: June 13, 2020 (aged 93); Big Spring, Texas
- Occupations: Reporter and mission interpreter

Marj Carpenter (August 23, 1926 – June 13, 2020) was an American reporter and mission interpreter for the Worldwide Ministries division of the Presbyterian Church (USA). She was elected to the church's top post, Moderator of the General Assembly, in 1995.

Carpenter was a native Texan. She won numerous journalism awards over her 50 years career as a reporter. She began as a cub reporter for The Enterprise in Mercedes, Texas. She was a reporter for the Big Spring Herald from 1970 to 1978. During her career in the church she traveled to over 120 countries where Presbyterians have mission work.

Carpenter served as director of the Presbyterian News Service for 15 years until her retirement in 1994 and then was elected as the Moderator of the General Assembly of the Presbyterian Church (USA) for a one-year term in July 1995. As Moderator, Carpenter served in the church's highest elected position and acted as the ambassador for the Presbyterian Church (USA).

For many years she maintained a rigorous public speaking schedule, lifting up Presbyterian mission in thousands of congregations, hundreds of presbyteries and other church gatherings. She served on several Presbyterian seminary boards and committees. She held honorary degrees from Austin College in Sherman, Texas; Presbyterian College in Clinton, South Carolina; and Seoul Women's University in South Korea.

Carpenter published two books on mission: To the Ends of the Earth and And a Little Bit Farther; and two books of stories about her experiences as a west Texas newspaper reporter: Ridin' Fence Volume 1 and Ridin' Fence Volume 2.

Carpenter died on June 13, 2020, in Big Spring, Texas, at the age of 93.

Religious titles
| Preceded by The Rev. Robert W.Bohl | Moderator of the 207th General Assembly of the Presbyterian Church (USA); 1995–1996 | Succeeded by The Rev. John M. Buchanan |
