= Minnie Howard =

American physician and historian (1872–1965)

Minnie Frances Howard (August 23, 1872 – September 2, 1965) was "Pocatello's pioneer woman physician" and a dedicated historian. She was also active in building the town of Pocatello, Idaho, through her work with various civic and religious organizations.

== Early life ==
Minnie Frances Hayden Howard was born August 23, 1872, in Memphis, Missouri, to Jacob and Carina Jane Wood Hayden. She studied first to become a teacher. After her marriage to a young medical student, William Forrest Howard, on August 23, 1894, in Larned, Kansas, she attended and graduated from Kansas University Women's Medical School. She accompanied her husband while he studied surgical procedures in Vienna, Austria.

== Life in Pocatello ==
Howard moved to Pocatello with her husband in 1902. They established medical practices and became active, respected members of the community. They had four sons, all of whom went on to become doctors themselves.

Howard was an early president of the Southeast Idaho Historical Society, the first co-chairman of the Red Cross for both Bannock and Caribou Counties, and put together other civic organizations such as the Art and Travel Club and the County Social Welfare Board. Guided by pioneer Ezra Meeker and native Jim Broncho, Howard verified the original location of Fort Hall and drove the effort to erect a monument there, also taking part in the organization and direction of the Oregon Trail Memorial Association.

Howard chaired, served as president of, or was a member of Daughters of the American Revolution, Descendants of Mayflower Association, Scientific Temperance Investigation, Women's Christian Temperance Union, Women's Study League, Federated Women's Club, Department of Indian Welfare, and Pocatello Women's Club. She was also an active member of the First Congregational Church, Pocatello, writing a history of the church in November 1928.

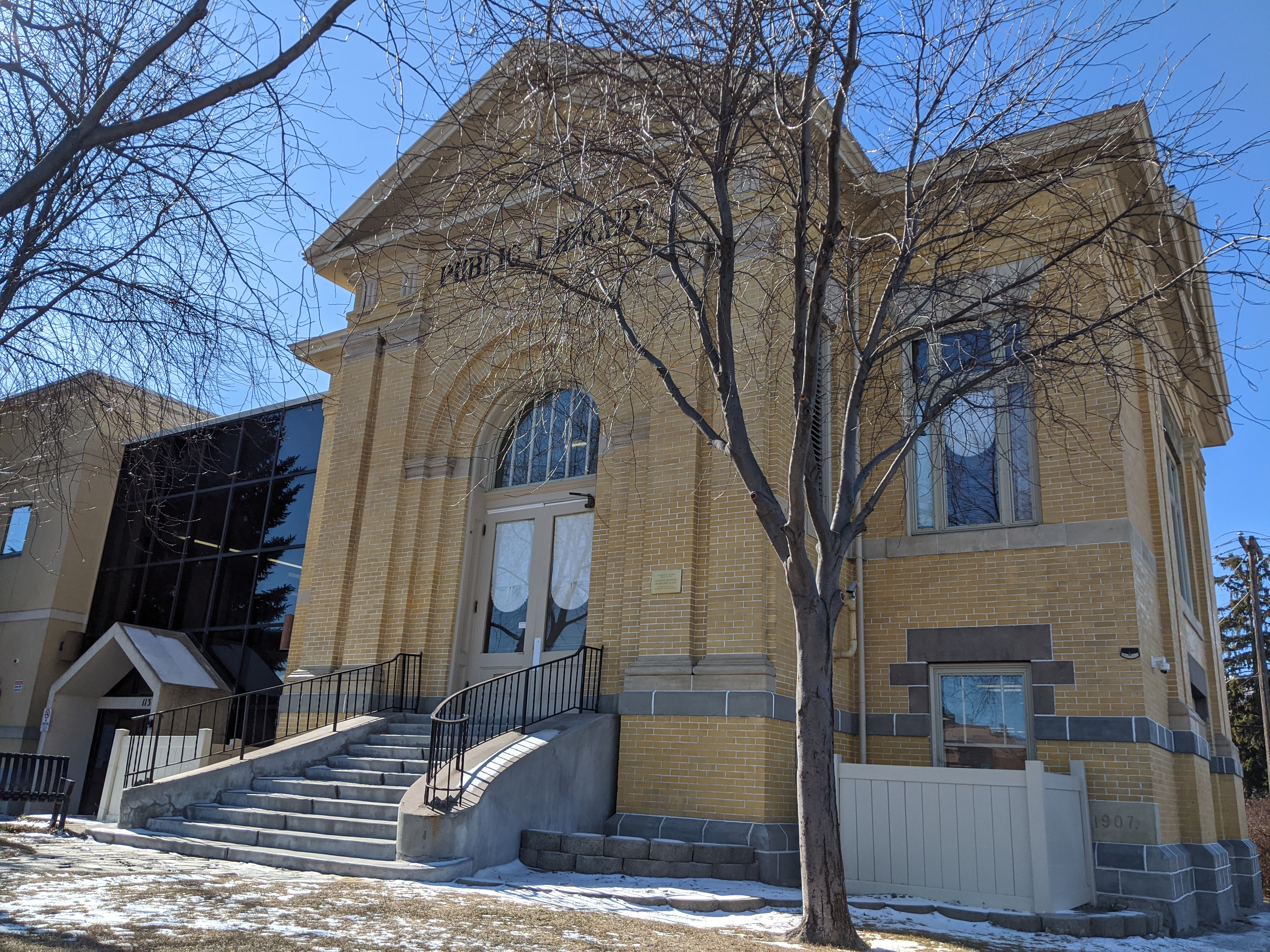
The original Pocatello Public Library building is now part of the larger Marshall Public Library facility.

Howard was crucial in the campaign to secure funding from Andrew Carnegie and Pocatello city council support to build the Pocatello Public Library, a Carnegie library later renamed the Marshall Public Library. Two years after the library opened, the Howard family built and inhabited a home next door.

Howard was an avid writer, penning numerous columns in The Pocatello Tribune, a portion of which were collected into a published history of Bannock County.

== Death ==
After a lifetime of leadership, service, and scholarship, Howard died at the Bannock Nursing Home on September 2, 1965, at the age of 93.
