= Marsha Shuler =

Marsha Shuler is a journalist in Louisiana. In 2025 she was inducted into the Louisiana Political Hall of Fame.

A native of Shreveport, Louisiana, she attended C. E. Byrd High School where she worked on The High Life school newspaper. She also studied at Louisiana College and Centenary College.

Early in her career she reported for the Shreveport Times. Later she reported from the state capitol for the Baton Rouge Advocate. She was involved in press organizations. Olwen Rutherford Shuler was her mother.
