= Idaho Department of Commerce =

State agency in Idaho, United States

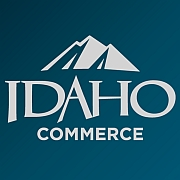

Agency overview
- Jurisdiction: Government of Idaho
- Agency executive: Tom Kealey, Director
- Website: Official website

The Idaho Department of Commerce is the state-level economic development agency for the State of Idaho. It utilizes resources at the state level to improve the state's economic growth by issuing public grants, tax credits, and tax exemptions.

== Organization ==
The department consists of five divisions: marketing; tourism development; international business; commercial innovation; and economic development.

=== Economic Development Division ===
- Business Development provides counseling, networking, and revenue generating opportunities for entrepreneurs and helps businesses retain and develop their workforce.
- Community Development evaluates the economic strengths, weaknesses, and opportunities for local communities. In addition, Community Development helps communities obtain funds to improve public infrastructure and provide valuable training to local leaders.
- Business Attraction seeks to attract companies from key industries to Idaho in order to create high-wage, high-growth jobs and diversify the economy.

=== International Business Division ===
The International Business Division's goal is to identify prospects for Idaho products and services in international markets and help companies capitalize on these opportunities by offering export/import counseling, market research, coordination of trade missions and trade shows as well as incoming buying delegations. The Port of Lewiston was formed in 1958 by the voters of Nez Perce County. In accordance with Idaho Code 70–1101, the Port oversees harbor operations, terminal facilities, international trade, and industrial and economic development. Idaho supports full-time offices in China, Taiwan and Mexico. Trade office representatives are citizens of these countries and contract employees of Idaho. There are several services provided by the International Trade Offices including:

- Market Research & Business Consultations: Trade offices identify the most promising sales and marketing opportunities for Idaho companies, help develop international sales strategies, and provide in-country market research and due diligence services on potential foreign business partners. They also answer international marketing questions through counseling appointments and help translate promotional material.
- Sales Channels: The trade offices qualify and identify potential distributors for Idaho companies. The trade managers also facilitate business partnerships and help locate buyers.
- In-Country Support: Trade office managers arrange key meetings with buyers, business partners, and government officials according to company needs. They are also available for interpretation services during business meetings.
- Trade Shows/Diplomatic Relations: Trade office managers promote Idaho products and services through industry brochures at a variety of industry trade shows to provide exposure for Idaho companies and develop international trade leads. They help Idaho companies participate in trade shows in their respective countries and serve as liaisons between Idaho and international governments.
- Export Counseling: Trade Specialists work with people one-on-one to help determine export potential, analyze target markets and provide market research, define market entry strategies, answer questions on payment terms, financing, logistics, shipping, and a variety of other export-related topics.
- Trade Missions: With state support, Idaho companies are able to meet with high-level executives in target companies abroad and build relationships with foreign government officials.
- International Buying Delegations: An intensive screening process is used to pre-qualify delegations of international buyers. Delegations travel throughout Idaho visiting companies and create opportunities to promote companies and their products to foreign buyers.
- Export Education and Community Resources: Export education is provided through periodic workshops and seminars designed for both new-to-export companies and those with years of international experience.

=== Tourism Development Division ===
The Tourism Division builds the economy by promoting Idaho as a visitor destination on a national and international level. The division uses strategic marketing and public relations to create awareness of Idaho's attractions and foster sustainable growth. The division also supports local non-profit and regional tourism development organizations through a competitive marketing grant program. Workshops, training, blogs, co-op marketing opportunities and assistance with marketing and public relations efforts are available to all tourism suppliers in Idaho. The $1.3 billion tourism industry plays a vital part in Idaho's economy by providing over 41,600 direct jobs which generate almost $500 million in local, state, and federal tax revenues.

The Tourism Division hosts the Idaho Conference on Recreation and Tourism in early May each year. The conference brings together tourism industry members from the private and public sectors with experts in the areas of marketing/promotion, social networking, public relations, technology and public land management for an educational exchange.

== Industries ==
Idaho's diverse economy holds opportunities for a wide variety of businesses.

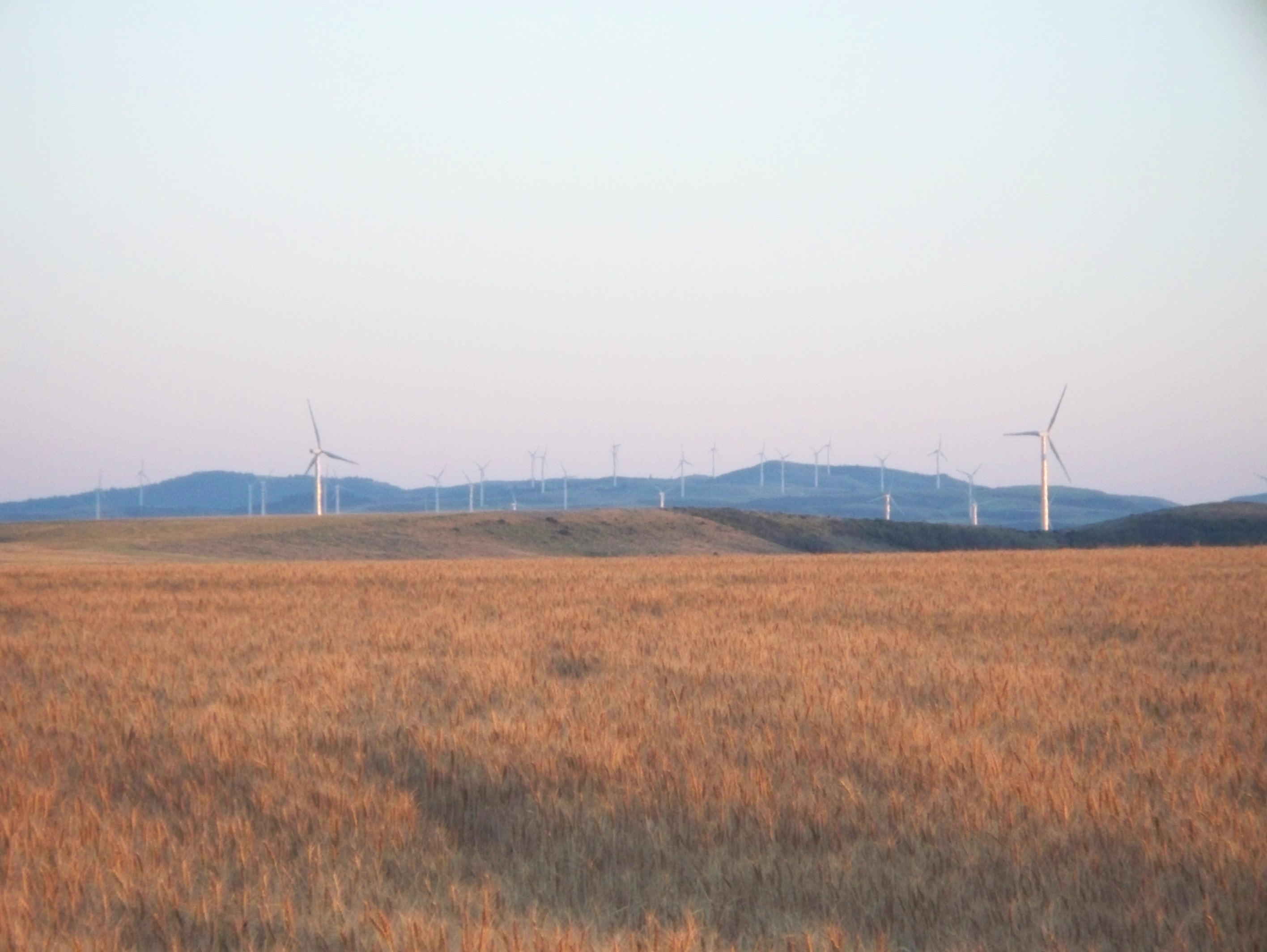
Goshen South Windfarm

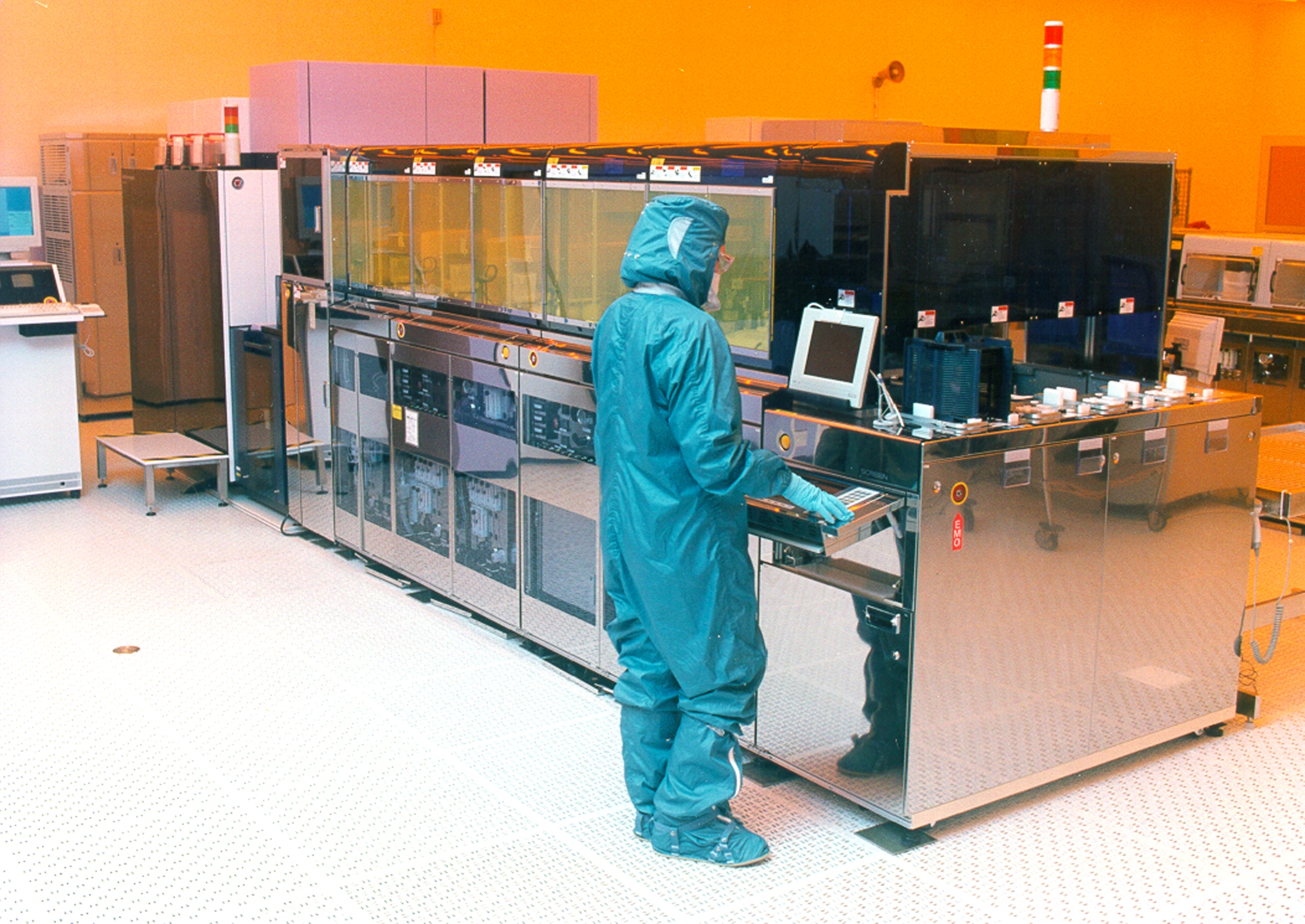
Scientist working on wafers and semiconductor technology in lab

=== Renewable energy ===
Idaho is a perfect testing ground for renewable energy technologies, and already alternative energy manufacturing companies are moving in to tap Idaho's business climate. Idaho is home to many companies and university research institutions focused on additional research areas such as fuel cells, low-power batteries, electric car technologies, kinetic energy capture, biomass, and new alternative fuels.

=== Technology and innovation ===
Idaho has a specialized focus in these technology platforms: Agricultural/Biological Sciences, Power & Energy, Software Technology, Communications Technology, Digital Imaging & Sensor Technology, and New Materials & Nanotechnology. Idaho is home to one of the world's largest and only U.S. - based memory chip firms, Micron Technology, Inc, and is the center of Hewlett-Packard Company's highly profitable Imaging and Printing Group, birthplace of HP's laser-jet printer, and one of the firm's largest worldwide facilities.

Idaho is also home to the Idaho National Laboratory, a federal research facility that has helped commercialize products and led to many startups in the areas of energy and environmental remediation. The INL was designated as the lead nuclear research institution in the country, and is pioneering work in virtually all forms of alternative energy. For example, the Bioenergy Program embraces the idea of – “Whole Crop Utilization” – converting plant byproducts such as cellulose stalks into cellulose-based ethanol. It is the lead national lab in geothermal sciences, conducts ongoing hydropower research to further diversity the nation's energy supply, and is working to develop techniques that can dramatically increase wind energy use in the Western United States.

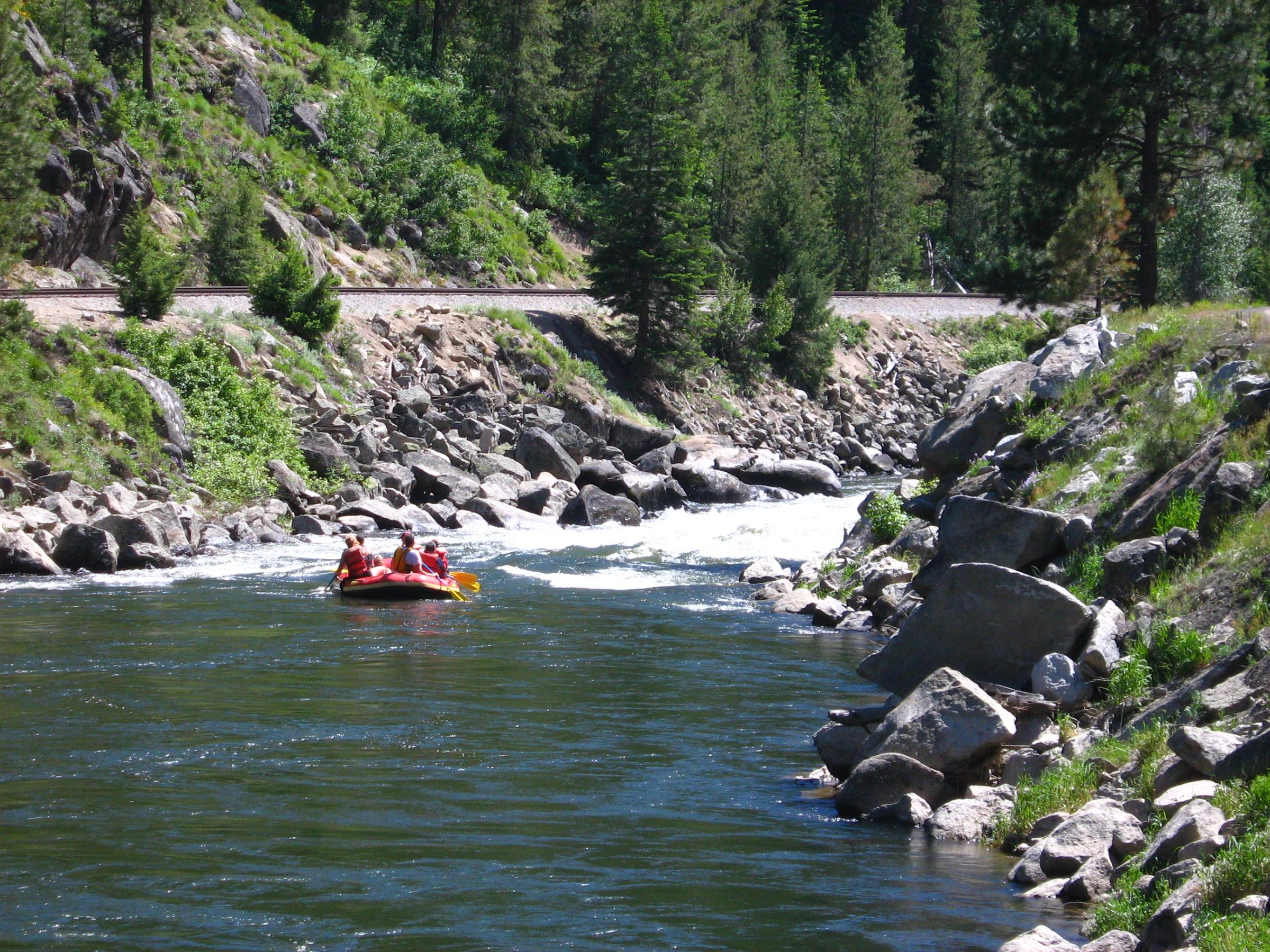
Rafters prepare for rapids on the North Fork near Banks, Idaho, close to the beginning of the main stem of the Payette River

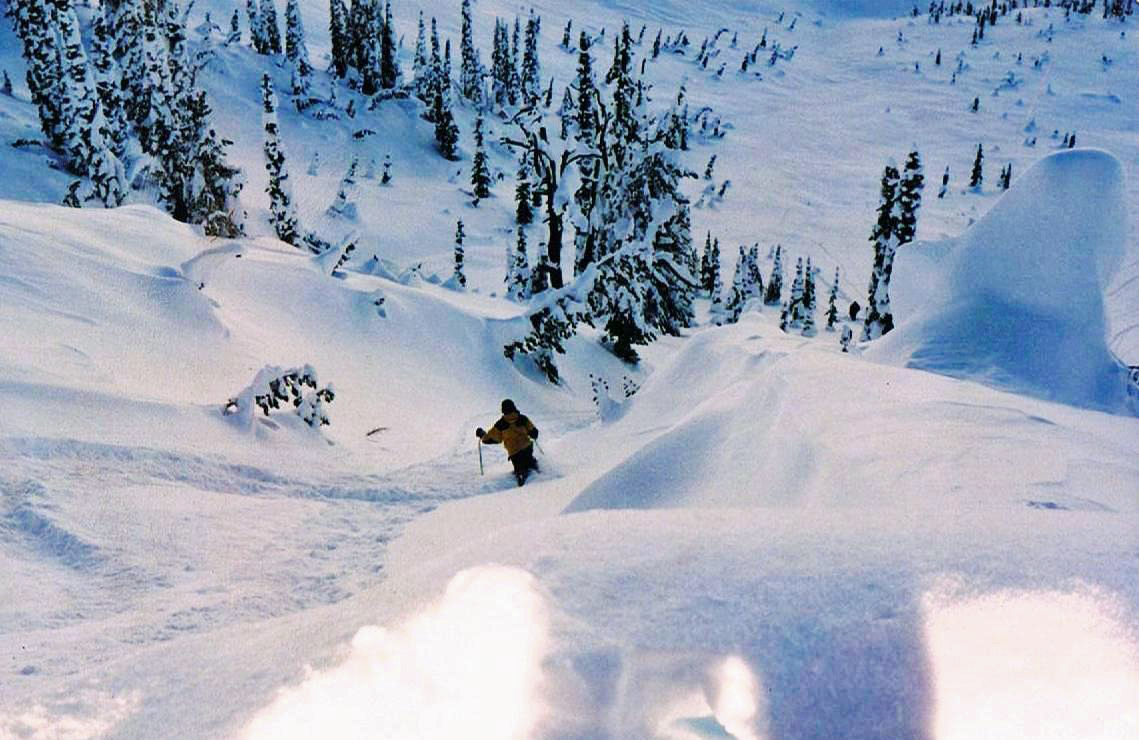
Skier going down a run in the Sawtooth Mountains in Idaho

=== Recreational technology ===
Abundant recreational opportunities make Idaho a potential market for any business in the Recreational Technology industry. From the emerald green hillsides, timbered mountains and pristine lakes of the panhandle, to the jagged peaks of central Idaho, all the way down to the Snake River Basin with its wide open vistas and irrigated farm lands, the Gem State can provide companies with the right environment to help their businesses thrive. In addition, Idaho's diverse landscape is a prime research ground for companies to test their products in the environments where they would be used.

=== Tourism ===
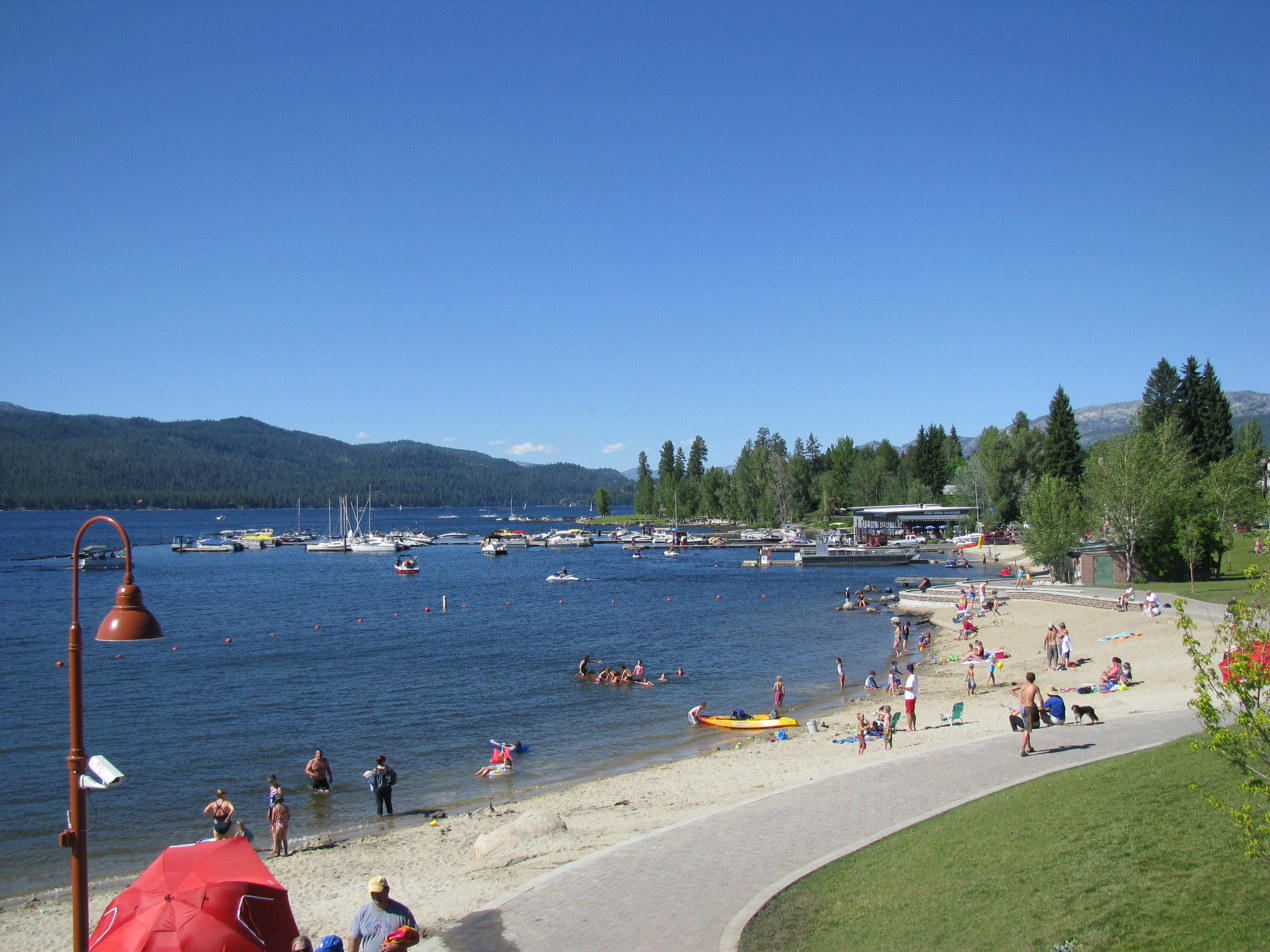
McCall, Idaho

Idaho acts as a primarily leisure-travel state. Building Idaho's economy by increasing visitor expenditures throughout the state is the goal of Idaho Department of Commerce's Tourism Development Division. The division's activities are funded by a two percent lodging tax, paid by travelers and collected by the state's hotel, motel and private campground owners. Tax collections have grown to over $9 million annually. Forty-five percent of the funds are used for statewide programs targeted to international and domestic consumers, tour operators, travel agents, travel journalists, and film industry marketing. Another forty-five percent is distributed to non-profit local and regional tourism development organizations through the Idaho Regional Travel and Convention Grant Program. The remaining ten percent is used for administration of the division. According to the U.S. Travel Association, Idaho's $1.3 billion tourism industry employs over 41,600 Idahoans and generated over $411 million in local, state, and federal tax revenues.
