= Mary Elizabeth Donaldson (physician) =

American physician (1851–1941)

- Born: Mary Elizabeth Craker; January 12, 1851; Reedsburg, Wisconsin, US
- Died: 1941 (aged 89–90); Napa, California, US
- Education: University of Wooster
- Occupation: physician

Mary Elizabeth Donaldson (1851–1941) was an American physician.

Donaldson née Craker was born in Reedsburg, Wisconsin on January 12, 1851. In 1892 she graduated with a medical degree from University of Wooster in Wooster, Ohio. She then moved to Boise, Idaho where she began a health sanitarium focusing on proper diet and exercise. With the success of that facility Donaldson opened another in Milton, Oregon, and a third in Portland, Oregon, By the turn of the century her health sanitariums were successful and she began to offer free treatment at her Idaho Sanitarium Institute in Boise.

Also at the turn of the century Donaldson and her husband Gilbert Donaldson established the Donaldson Home for the Aging where free care was provided to the elderly.

Donaldson was a member of the American Woman's League and a prohibitionist.

Donaldson was married three times. The first time to Mr. Hesford. The couple's child died at the age of four and the marriage ended in divorce. Her second marriage was to Thomas L. Johnston who facilitated her medical education at the University of Wooster. He died in 1898. Her third marriage was to Gilbert Donaldson whom she married in 1912.

Donaldson died in Napa, California. Sources differ on her date of death. American National Biography suggests 1930 as a death year, noting that "date of her death seems not to be recorded, although she is believed to have died in 1930." Idaho's Women of Influence lists her death year as 1941. as does the history blog "South Fork Companion".
