= Oregon-California Trails Association =

The Oregon-California Trails Association is an interdisciplinary organization based at Independence, Missouri, United States. OCTA is dedicated to the preservation and protection of overland emigrant trails and the emigrant experience.

OCTA Chapters work closely with National Trails System partners to help interpret and sustain the quality of outdoor recreation experiences along these trail corridors. For example, OCTA's guide to Mapping Emigrant Trails (MET Manual) became the National Park Service's benchmark protocol for GPS-assisted topographical mapping along other historic and scenic trails.

Three major historical trails crossed America's western territories as wagon train routes to Santa Fe, Oregon, and California. The Santa Fe Trail began in 1821 as a 900-mile (1,400 km) foreign trade route to New Mexico. It was unique in American History due to its overland commerce routes rather than seafaring transportation. The 2,000-mile (3,200 km) Oregon Trail became more heavily traveled in 1843 by settlers wanting to establish new homes in the northwest. Other pioneers forked off on the equally long and grueling California Trail to seek their fortunes in the gold fields.

The association succeeded the Oregon Trail Memorial Association, founded by pioneer Ezra Meeker in 1922 as the Old Oregon Trail Association to memorialize those who traveled to the U.S. West Coast via the Oregon Trail. The group was incorporated in New York in early 1926. The organization is best known for promoting the Oregon Trail Memorial half dollar. It was succeeded by the American Pioneer Trails Association (APTA) in 1940. Oregon-California Trails Association is considered a successor to OTMA.

== See also ==
- National Historic Trails
