= Chachalu Tribal Museum and Cultural Center =

Museum of the Confederated Tribes of Grand Ronde, in Oregon

- Chachalu
- Former name: Willamina Middle School
- Established: June 12, 2014
- Location: 8720 Grand Ronde Road, Grand Ronde, Oregon, 97347, US
- Coordinates: 45.06°N 123.61°W
- Type: Tribal
- Director: David Harrelson (Cultural Resources Manager)
- Curator: Travis Stewart
- Owner: Confederated Tribes of the Grand Ronde Community of Oregon
- Website: www.chachalu.org

Chachalu Tribal Museum and Cultural Center shares the culture and history of the Confederated Tribes of Grand Ronde and is on their reservation lands in Oregon.

== History ==
The center first opened in 2014 and was once a middle school. It closed to the public during the COVID-19 pandemic, but reopened in 2022.

"Chachalu" is a Kalapuyan word for "the place of the burnt timbers." The land the museum is located on was burned by a forest fire shortly before the tribes were relocated to the reservation lands.

== Operations ==
The building is located in Grand Ronde, Oregon, and is operated by the Confederated Tribes of Grand Ronde. The dream for the center was to be a place for the peoples of the Confederated Tribes of Grand Ronde to tell their own story, as well as serve as a place to safely store artifacts and objects.

== Design and exhibits ==
The museum and cultural center includes a model cedar plankhouse sited outside the primary building, following the design of the plankhouse near the Confederated Tribes of Grand Ronde powwow grounds.

The museum has cultural items on display as well as wall-sized images of nature and landscapes. Wooden canoes are stored on display during the winter and are used in the summer. There is minimal written information or chronological timeline, which is meant to encourage asking questions and leaning into the living culture of the Grand Ronde, as well as emphasize that the center is designed for the Tribes' needs, not necessarily for informing tourists.

=== Temporary exhibits ===
In a temporary exhibit "The Rise of the Collectors", on display from June 2018 to May 2019, Chachalu Museum and Cultural Center displayed 16 artifacts from the Summers Collection. The objects were on loan from storage at the British Museum, where they are part of more than 200 items of the Summers Collection that are related to the Confederated Tribes of Grand Ronde. The loan allowed tribal members to study and document techniques and materials used to craft the objects.

"My Father's Father's Sister" focused on Shimkhin, a Atfalati Kalapuya healer born in 1921. "Transgressors" was on display from December 2024 to April 2025 and explored Indigenous queer identity through artwork by a variety of artists.

== See also ==
- List of museums in Oregon
