= List of National Natural Landmarks in Idaho =

There are 11 National Natural Landmarks in Idaho.

Idaho National Natural Landmarks (clickable map)

Name	Image	Date	Location	County	Ownership	Description
Big Southern Butte		1976	Atomic City43.401389°N 113.023889°W	Butte	federal (Bureau of Land Management)	A 2,500 ft Rhyolitic dome that rises over the Eastern Snake River Plain. It illustrates the scope and dimensions of Quaternary volcanism in the western United States.
Big Springs		1980	Island Park44.500278°N 111.255278°W	Fremont	federal (Caribou-Targhee National Forest)	The only first-magnitude spring in the country that issues forth from rhyolitic lava flows.
Cassia Silent City of Rocks	City of Rocks	1974	Malta42.076026°N 113.701676°W	Cassia	federal (City of Rocks National Reserve)	Monolithic landforms created by exfoliation processes on exposed massive granite plutons.
Crater Rings		1980	Mountain Home43.1907°N 115.8597°W	Elmore	federal (Morley Nelson Snake River Birds of Prey National Conservation Area)	Two adjacent and symmetrical pit craters that are among the few examples of this type of crater in the continental United States.
Great Rift of Idaho		1968	Craters of the Moon National Monument and Preserve43.46167°N 113.56278°W	Blaine, Minidoka, Power	federal (Craters of the Moon National Monument and Preserve)	A tensional fracture in the Earth's crust.
Hagerman Fauna Sites		1975	Hagerman Fossil Beds National Monument42.7906°N 114.9448°W	Twin Falls	federal (Hagerman Fossil Beds National Monument)	Contains the world's richest deposits of Upper Pliocene age terrestrial fossils.
Hell's Half Acre Lava Field	Hell's Half Acre Lava Field	1976	Blackfoot43.5°N 112.45°W	Bingham, Bonneville	federal (Bureau of Land Management)	Fully exposed pahoehoe lava flow.
Hobo Cedar Grove Botanical Area	Hobo Cedar Grove	1980	Shoshone47.0911°N 116.127°W	Shoshone	federal (St. Joe National Forest)	An outstanding example of pristine western red cedar forest.
Menan Buttes	North Menan Butte	1980	Menan43.6°N 111.5°W	Jefferson, Madison	federal (Bureau of Land Management)	Contains outstanding examples of glass tuff cones, which are found in only a few places in the world.
Niagara Springs	Niagara Springs	1980	Hagerman42.85778°N 114.87639°W	Gooding	private	Least developed of the large springs discharging into the Snake River from the Snake River plain aquifer system.
Sheep Rock	Sheep Rock	1976	Council45.191651°N 116.67132°W	Adams	federal (Payette National Forest)	Horizontally layered lavas that represent successive flows on the Columbia River Basalt Plateau.

== See also ==
- List of National Historic Landmarks in Idaho
