= Cedar Snags =

- U.S. National Register of Historic Places
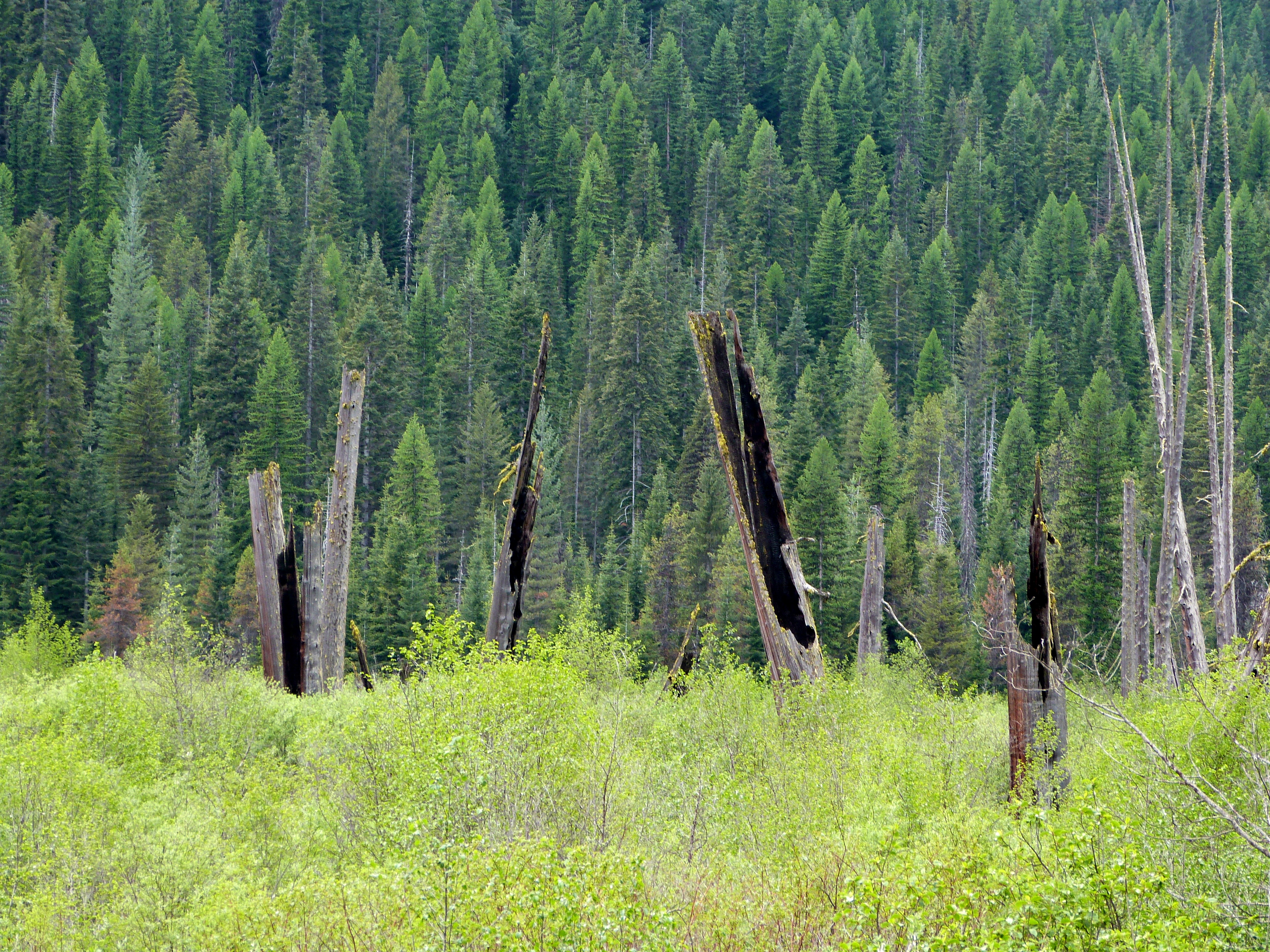

- Location within Idaho Location within the United States
- Nearest city: Avery, Idaho
- Coordinates: 47°22′30″N 115°45′42″W
- Area: 100 acres (40 ha)
- MPS: North Idaho 1910 Fire Sites TR
- NRHP reference No.: 84001174
- Added to NRHP: September 20, 1984

Cedar Snags is a historic landscape area in Shoshone County, Idaho, where stumps of cedar trees remain from the Great Fire of 1910. The site was listed on the National Register of Historic Places in 1984.

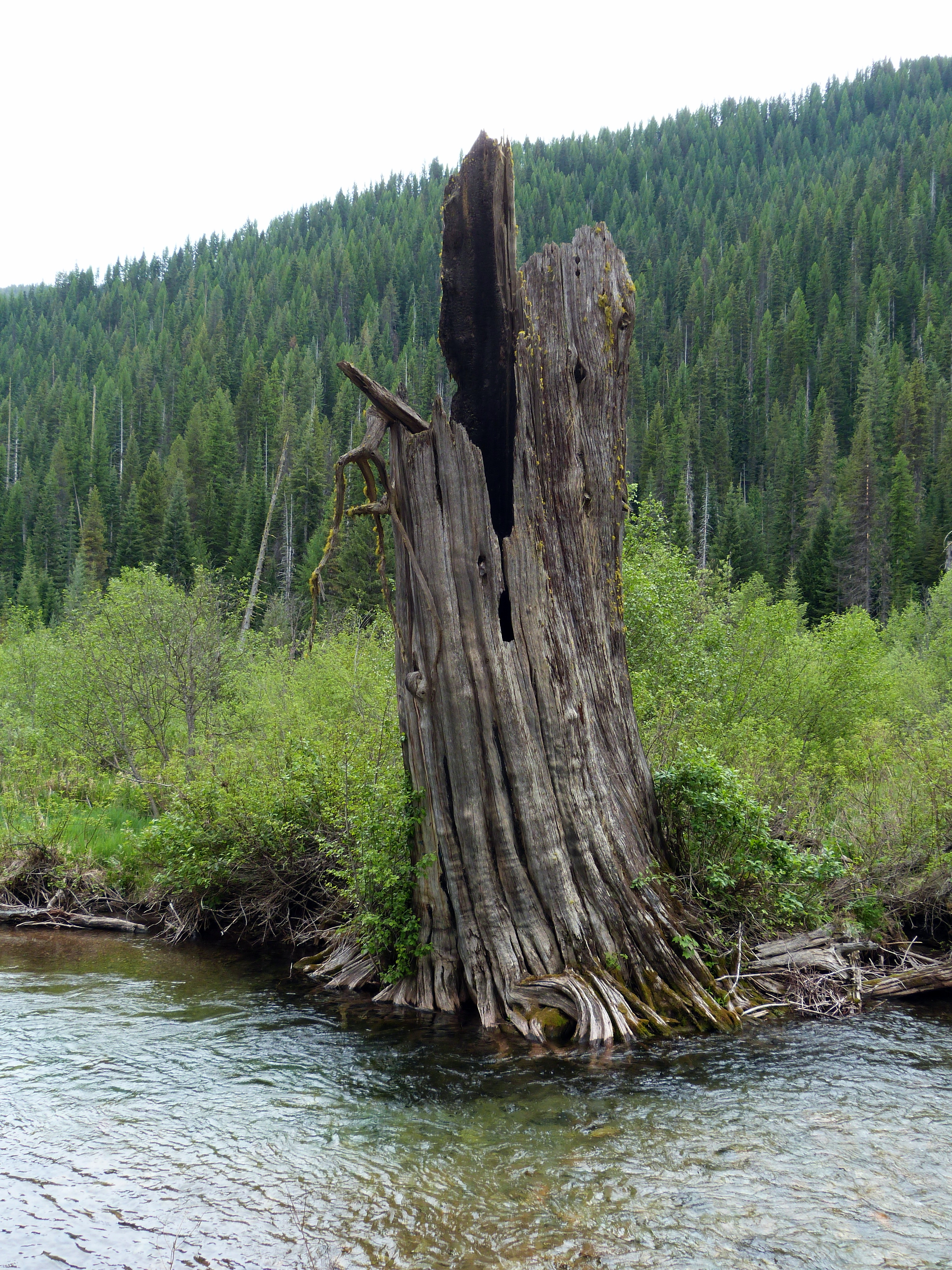

The snags are in a swampy area along the Saint Joe River's North Fork, near Bullion Creek, north of Avery, Idaho.

Salvage logging was done after 1910, but numerous large snags survived from 1910 to 1984 unchanged. The grove "stands as significant evidence of a vast forest that was destroyed by intense heat."
