= Grand Forks (disambiguation) =

Grand Forks is the third-largest city in the State of North Dakota, US.

Grand Forks may also refer to:

== Places ==
Canada

- Grand Forks, British Columbia
- Grand Forks, Yukon

United States

- Greater Grand Forks, a metropolitan area in North Dakota and Minnesota, including:
  - East Grand Forks, Minnesota
  - Grand Forks Air Force Base, North Dakota
  - Grand Forks County, North Dakota
  - Grand Forks Township, Polk County, Minnesota
- Grand Forks, Idaho

== Other uses ==
- Grand Forks Herald, a newspaper in Grand Forks, North Dakota, US
- Grand Forks Public Schools, the school district encompassing Grand Forks, North Dakota
- Grand Forks (album)
- Grand Forks: A History of American Dining in 128 Reviews, a 2013 book by Marilyn Hagerty
