= Saint Joe River =

Tributary of Coeur d'Alene Lake in northern Idaho

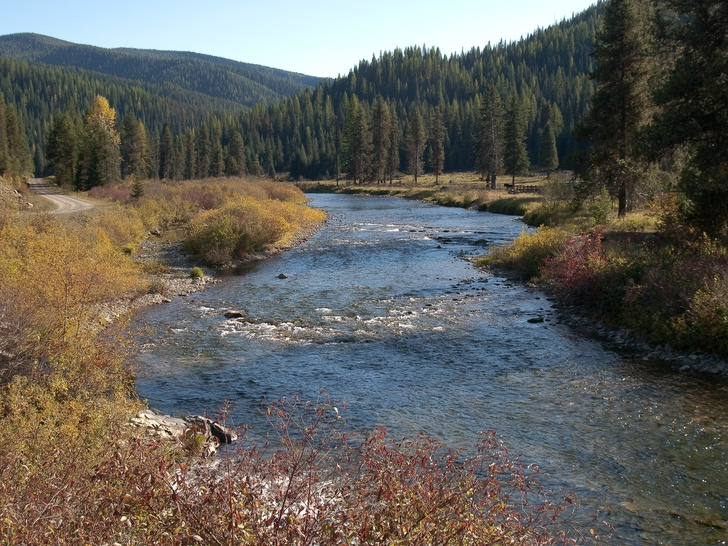
- Saint Joe River in the St. Joe National Forest

- Location in the United States Location of the mouth of the St. Joe River in Idaho

Location
- Country: United States
- State: Idaho
- Counties: Shoshone, Benewah, Kootenai

Physical characteristics
- Source: Northern Bitterroot Range
  - location: southwest of Superior, Montana, Shoshone County, Idaho
  - coordinates: 47°01′07″N 115°04′58″W
  - elevation: 6,487 ft (1,977 m)
- Mouth: Coeur d'Alene Lake
  - location: north of Heyburn State Park, Kootenai County, Idaho
  - coordinates: 47°23′35″N 116°45′15″W
  - elevation: 2,129 feet (649 m)
- Length: 140 miles (225 km)
- Basin size: 1,850 square miles (4,790 km^{2})
- Discharge
  - location: For Calder, Idaho
  - average: 3,773 cu ft/s (106.8 m^{3}/s)
  - minimum: 206 cu ft/s (5.8 m^{3}/s)
  - maximum: 14,400 cu ft/s (410 m^{3}/s)

Basin features
- Tributaries
  - left: St. Maries River

National Wild and Scenic River
- Type: Wild, Recreational
- Designated: November 10, 1978

The Saint Joe River (sometimes abbreviated St. Joe River) is a 140-mile (225 km) long tributary of Coeur d'Alene Lake in northern Idaho. Beginning at an elevation of 6,487 feet (1,977 m) in the Northern Bitterroot Range of eastern Shoshone County, it flows generally west through the Saint Joe River Valley and the communities of Avery and Calder. Past Calder, it flows into Benewah County and through the town of St. Maries, where it receives its largest tributary, the Saint Maries River. It then turns northwest, passing through Heyburn State Park before reaching its mouth just north of the Kootenai County line. Much of the river's route through Heyburn State Park is partially flooded due to raised water levels from the Washington Water Power dam at Post Falls on the Spokane River below Coeur d'Alene Lake. With a mouth elevation of 2,129 feet (649 m), it is claimed to be the highest navigable river in the world.

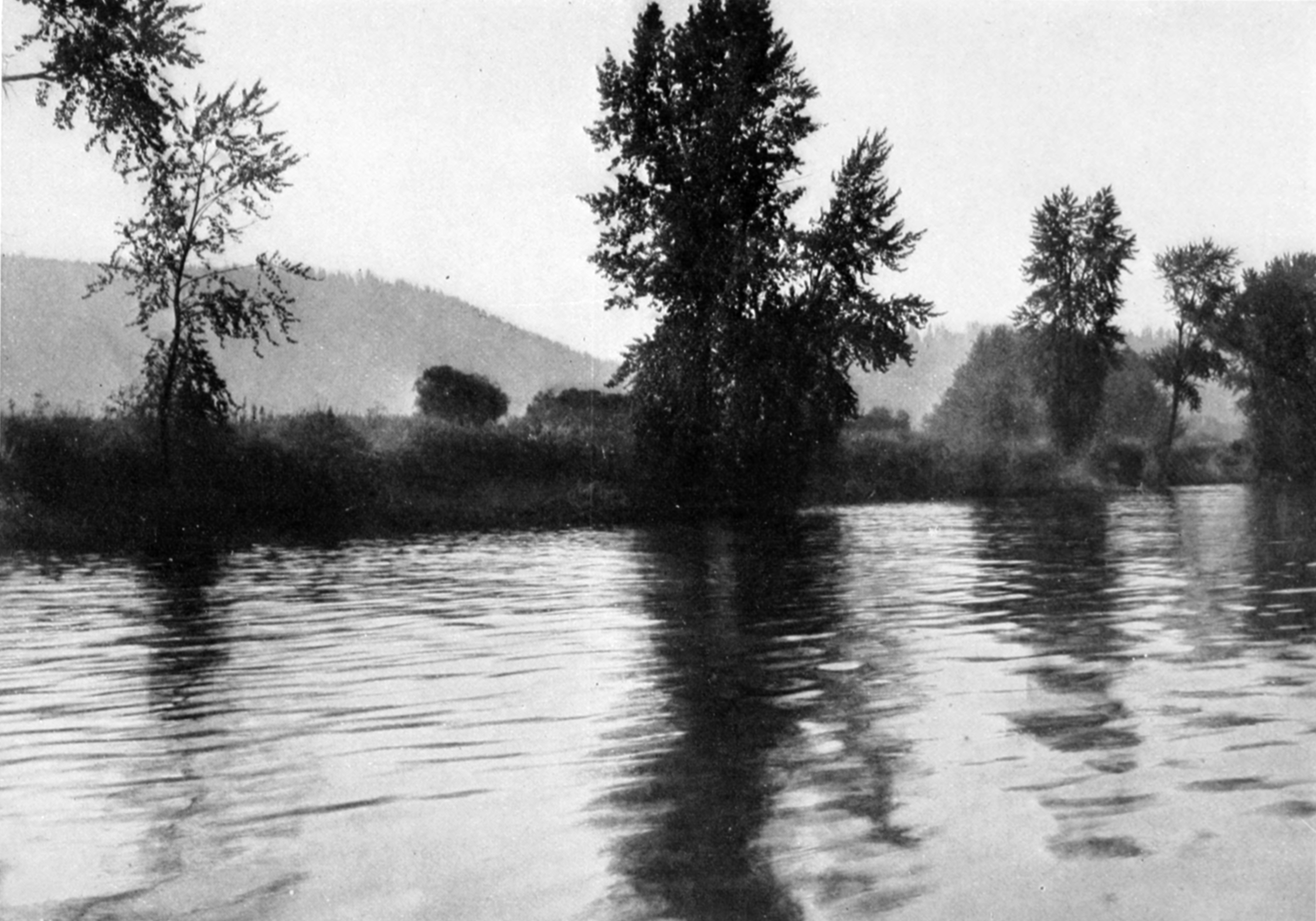
The "Shadowy St. Joe River" in 1909.

In 1978, 66.3 miles (107 km) of the river were protected by the National Wild and Scenic Rivers System, with 26.6 miles (43 km) designated as wild and another 39.7 miles (64 km) designated as recreational.

The Saint Joe River drains 1,850 square miles (4,790 km^{2}) of the Idaho Panhandle. It is part of the Spokane River watershed, which in turn is part of the Columbia River basin. About 68 percent is owned by the United States Forest Service (the St. Joe National Forest), 4 percent is owned by the Bureau of Land Management, 2 percent is owned by the State of Idaho, and the rest is privately owned.

The Saint Joe River watershed is covered primarily by mixed coniferous forest, which includes species such as Douglas fir, true fir, larch, and pine. Alder is common in the riparian zones of high altitude river valleys, while cottonwood dominates the lower altitude riparian zones, much of which have been converted to agricultural land. Rush, sedge, and cattails are common in the river's floodplains, which are also used to grow wild rice.

The river is home to many species of fish, including native westslope cutthroat trout, mountain whitefish, cedar sculpin and other cottids, shiners, and nonnative rainbow and brook trout, chinook and Kokanee Salmon. The upper Saint Joe River is also home to the last self-sustaining population of vulnerable bull trout in the Coeur d'Alene Lake watershed.

== See also ==
- Cedar Snags, National Register-listed area along the North Fork, where large tree stumps in a swampy area survive from the Great Fire of 1910
- List of rivers of Idaho
- List of longest streams of Idaho
- List of National Wild and Scenic Rivers
- Tributaries of the Columbia River
