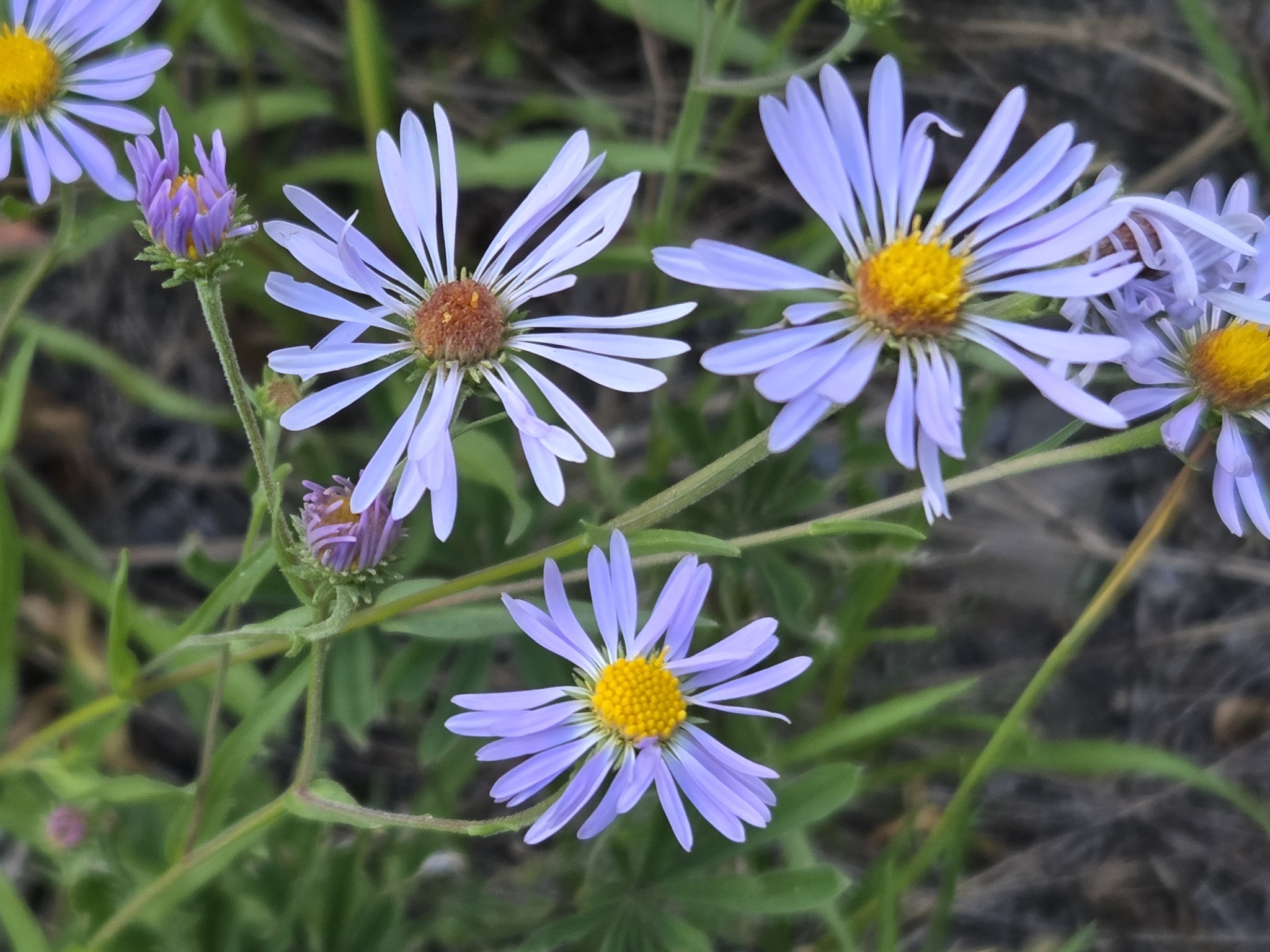

Conservation status
- Apparently Secure (NatureServe)

Scientific classification
- Kingdom: Plantae
- Clade: Tracheophytes
- Clade: Angiosperms
- Clade: Eudicots
- Clade: Asterids
- Order: Asterales
- Family: Asteraceae
- Tribe: Astereae
- Subtribe: Symphyotrichinae
- Genus: Symphyotrichum
- Subgenus: Symphyotrichum subg. Symphyotrichum
- Section: Symphyotrichum sect. Occidentales
- Species: S. hendersonii

Binomial name
- Symphyotrichum hendersonii (Fernald) G.L.Nesom
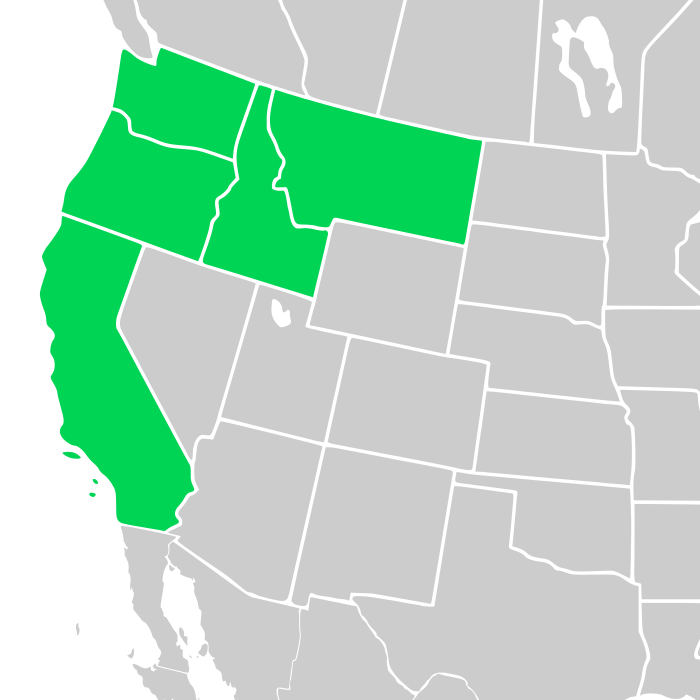
- Native distribution

Synonyms
- Aster hendersonii Fernald

= Symphyotrichum hendersonii =

Species of flowering plant in the daisy family

Symphyotrichum hendersonii (formerly Aster hendersonii) is a species of flowering plant in the family Asteraceae native to the northwestern United States. Commonly known as Henderson's aster, it is a perennial, herbaceous plant that may reach 70 to 150 centimeters (2 to 5 feet) tall. Its flowers have purple ray florets and yellow disk florets.

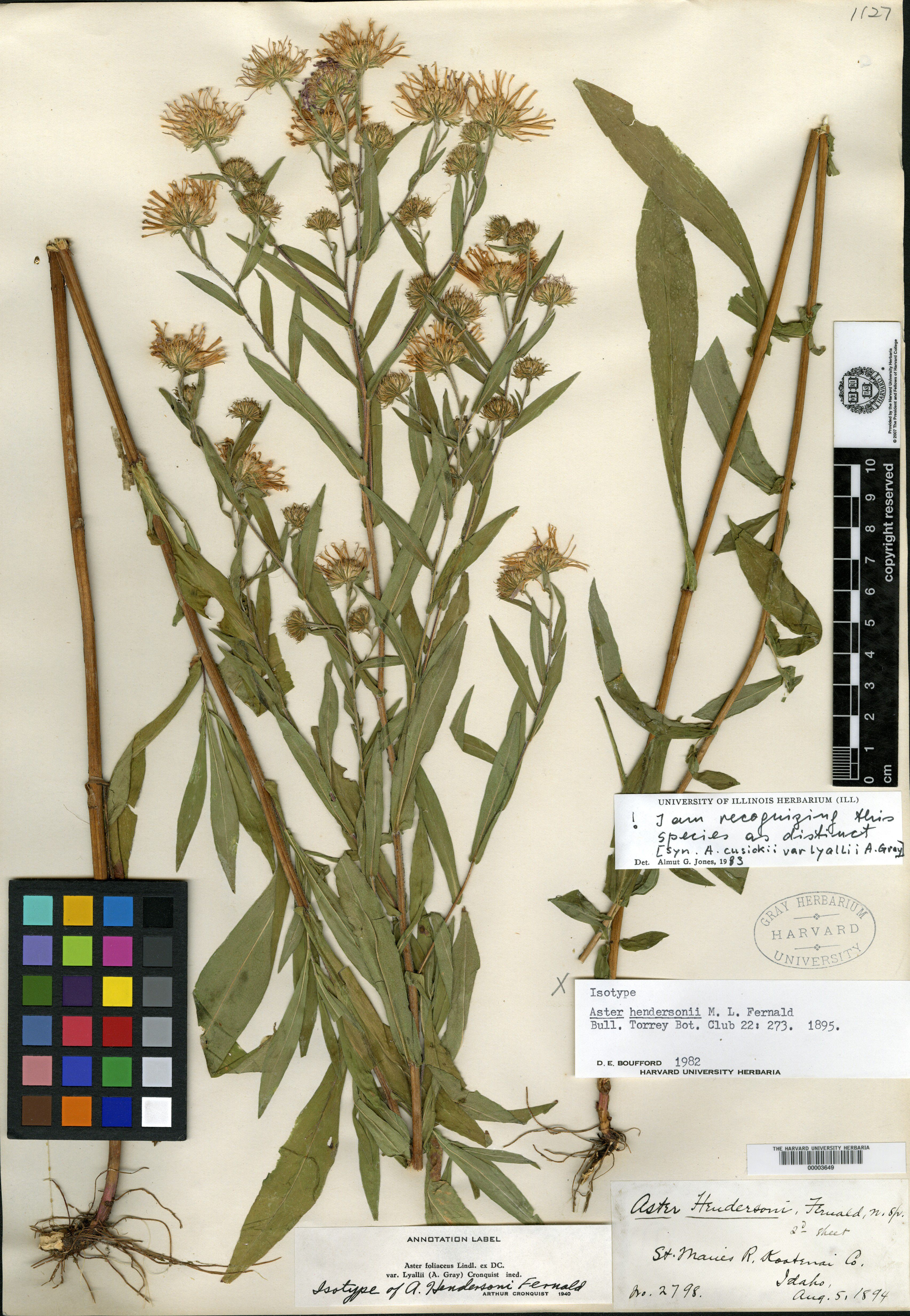
Isotype of Aster hendersonii stored at the Harvard University Herbarium. Collected 5 August 1894 at the Saint Maries River, Kootenai County, Idaho.
