= Swan Falls, Idaho =

Unincorporated community in Ada County, Idaho, United States

- Unincorporated community
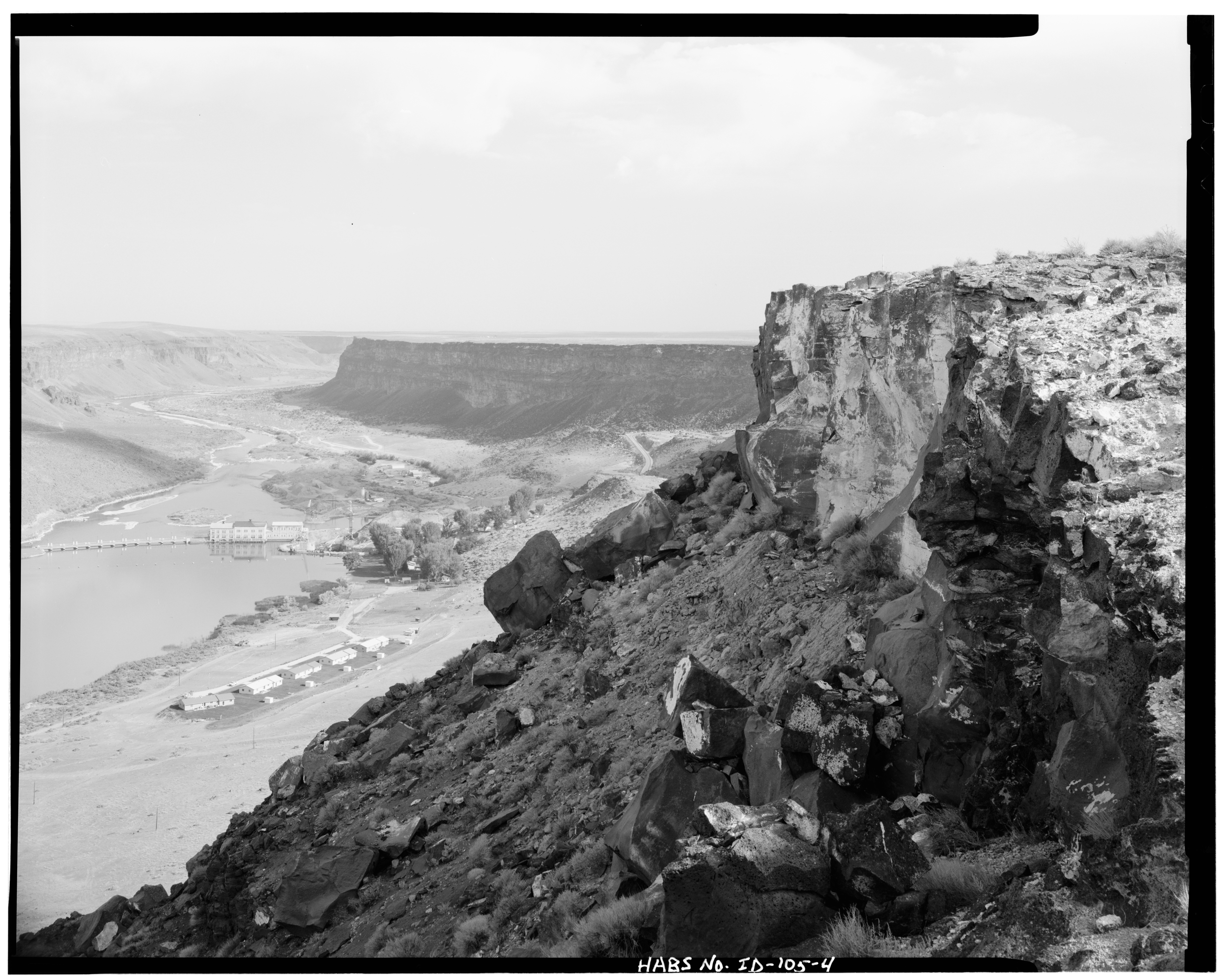
- View of the former Swan Falls Village and the Swan Falls Dam along the Snake River

- Location in Idaho Location in the United States
- Country: United States
- State: Idaho
- County: Ada
- Elevation: 2,359 ft (719 m)
- Time zone: UTC-7 (Mountain (MST))
  - Summer (DST): UTC-6 (MDT)
- ZIP Code: 83650
- Area codes: 208, 986
- GNIS feature ID: 376284

Swan Falls is an unincorporated community along the Snake River within the Morley Nelson Snake River Birds of Prey National Conservation Area in Ada County, Idaho, United States.

== Description ==
The Swan Falls Dam, the oldest hydroelectric dam on the Snake River, is located next to the community. The Swan Falls Dam and Power Plant is listed on the National Register of Historic Places. The former Swan Falls Village was previously a large part of the community.
