= Edward Pulaski Tunnel and Placer Creek Escape Route =

- U.S. National Register of Historic Places
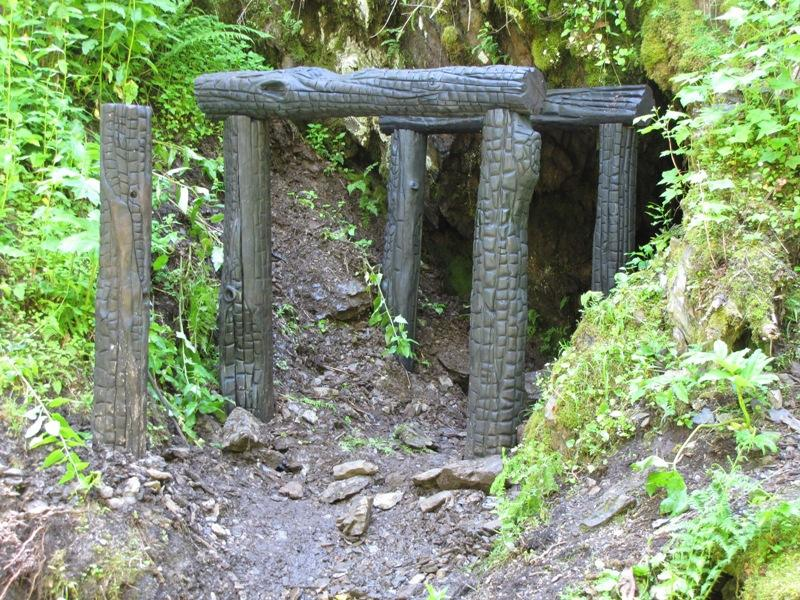
- Pulaski Tunnel entrance, restored in 2010

- Location within Idaho Location within the United States
- Location: West Fork Placer Creek
- Nearest city: Wallace, Idaho
- Coordinates: 47°26′42.2″N 115°57′46.6″W
- Area: 12 acres (4.9 ha)
- Built: 1910
- MPS: North Idaho 1910 Fire Sites TR
- NRHP reference No.: 84001179
- Added to NRHP: September 20, 1984

The Edward Pulaski Tunnel and Placer Creek Escape Route (also known as the Pulaski Tunnel) are two adjacent sites used by the United States Forest Service firefighter Edward Pulaski in the Great Fire of 1910 to save the lives of himself and most of his crew. The sites are located south of Wallace, Idaho in the Idaho Panhandle National Forests. Pulaski's tunnel and escape route are listed on the National Register of Historic Places in 1984.

== Fire of 1910 ==
The summer of 1910 was hot and dry, with an extremely high fire danger throughout the western United States. By August, there were approximately 1,400 wildfires burning out of control in northern Idaho, northeastern Washington, and northwestern Montana. On 20 August, some of these wildfires blew-up into huge firestorms, threatening a number of rural communities and trapping firefighting crews. One of those crews was led by Ed Pulaski.

Pulaski and his crew were fighting the fire in an area around the west fork of Placer Creek, approximately 10 miles (16 km) southwest of Wallace. When the fire became too dangerous, Pulaski ordered his forty-five men to evacuate toward Wallace. As they retreated, a second fire blocked their way, leaving them surrounded by fire. Pulaski knew the area so he was able to lead his men through the burning forest to an abandoned mine. The crew (along with two horses) entered the mine opening near the bank of Placer Creek just as the fire engulfed the area.

The mine was actually a short prospecting tunnel that had been abandoned because no ore was found there. The mine opening was 6 feet (1.8 m) high and 5 feet (1.5 m) wide. At the entrance, there were cedar floor planks and squeeze caps logs in place to prevent spalling. The total length of the mine was only 250 feet (76 m); however, that was enough to shelter Pulaski and his crew.

As the fire raged outside the mine, the heat caused the cold air in the tunnel to rush out, replacing it with hot air and smoke. Pulaski ordered the men to lie down on the floor of the mine where there was still some breathable air. As the fire closed in around the tunnel entrance, timber beams at the mouth of the tunnel began to burn. Pulaski carried water in his hat from pools on the mine floor to the entrance, trying to douse the flames. In the process, he was badly burned. Eventually, Pulaski fell unconscious, as did all his men.

The next morning, Pulaski counted 39 living men. One of his crew had been killed by a falling snag on the way to the mine; five others had died from smoke inhalation during the night (the two horses also died). After the fire in the surrounding forest died down, Pulaski and his crew followed Placer Creek to safety in Wallace.

In just two days, the Great Fire of 1910 consumed 3,000,000 acres (1,200,000 ha) of forest. The six men lost in or near Pulaski's tunnel were among 78 firefighters killed by the fire. There were also seven civilians who died in the fire; bringing the total loss of life to 85 people.

Because of its association with Ed Pulaski and the Great Fire of 1910, the Pulaski Tunnel and fire escape route were listed on the National Register of Historic Places in 1984. The tunnel also provides valuable information on historic mining methods in the Idaho panhandle.

== Site restoration ==
For many years, the only visible sign of Pulaski's escape route and refuge tunnel were two historical markers along a forest road south of Wallace. In 2002, a citizens group was organized to restore Pulaski's tunnel and improve the trail to the site. The effort was known as the Pulaski Project. The Forest Service joined the effort and began to develop the trail in 2005. Since then, the full length of the trail has been cleared and graded. In addition, five trail bridges have been installed along with a dozen interpretive signs that provide information about Pulaski, the 1910 fire, and various features found along the trail. At the trailhead, a parking area and restroom have been built.

Today, the trail is open to foot traffic only. From the trailhead, the hike to the tunnel is approximately 2 miles (3.2 km), a round-trip hike of 4 miles (6.4 km). The elevation gain between the trailhead and the tunnel is 800 feet (240 m), making the hike moderately challenging. The trailhead is located just off Forest Road 456, approximately 1 mile (1.6 km) south of Wallace, Idaho.

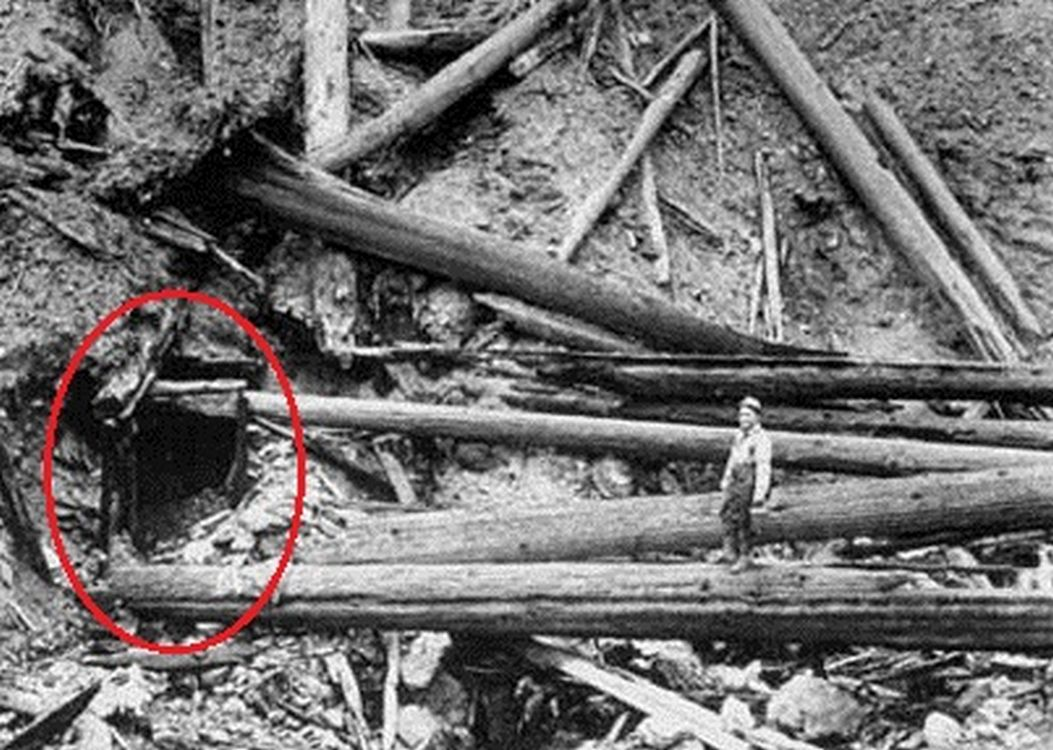
Tunnel after 1910 fire

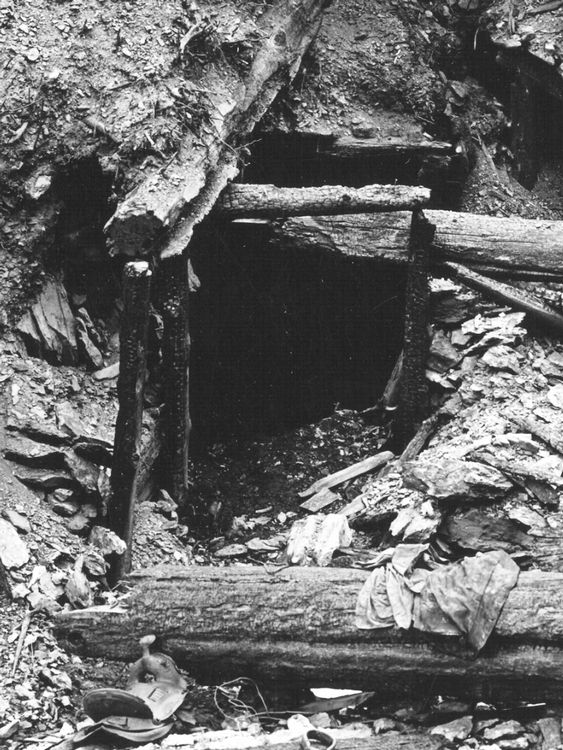
Tunnel entrance, 1910

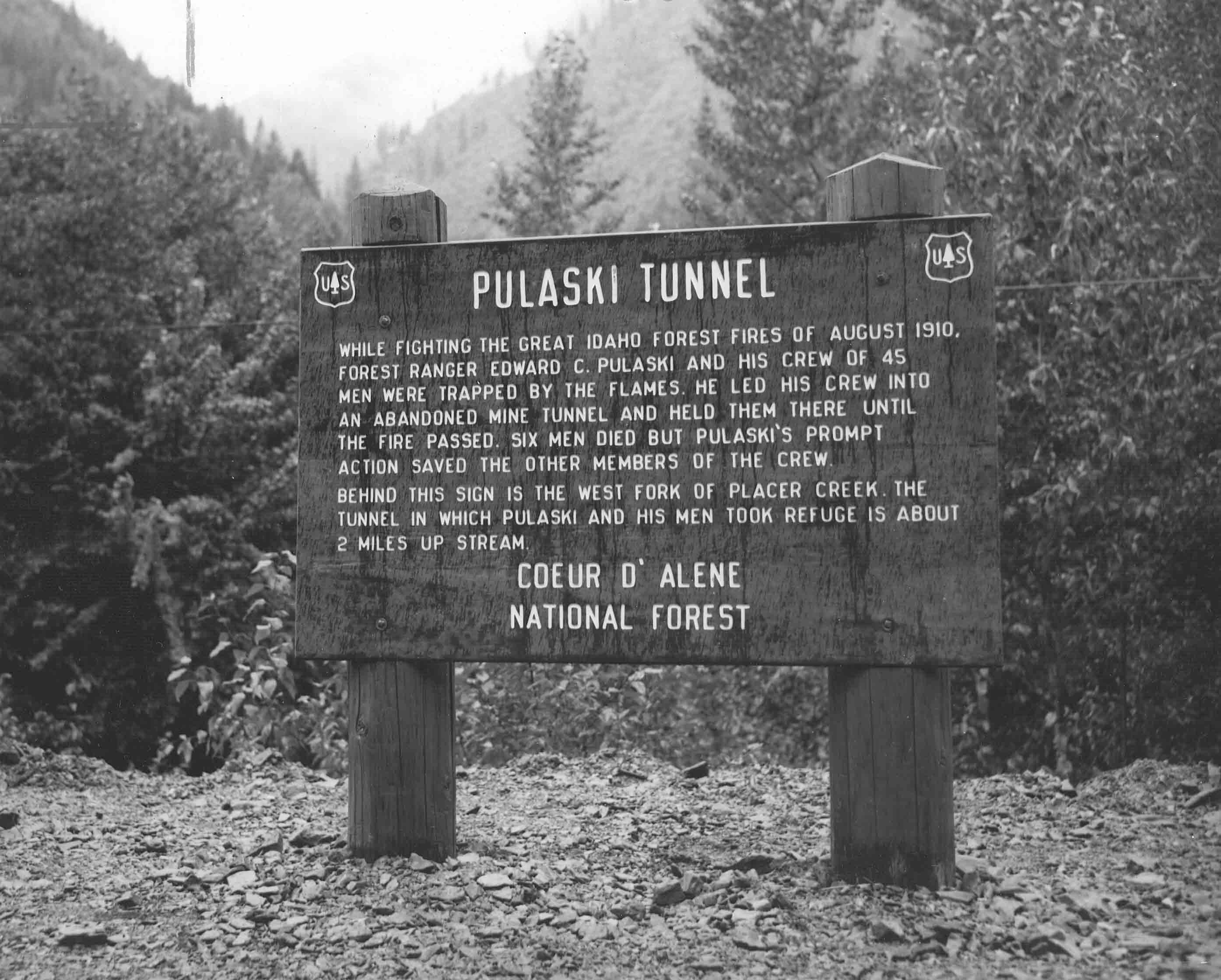
Historic marker, 1960

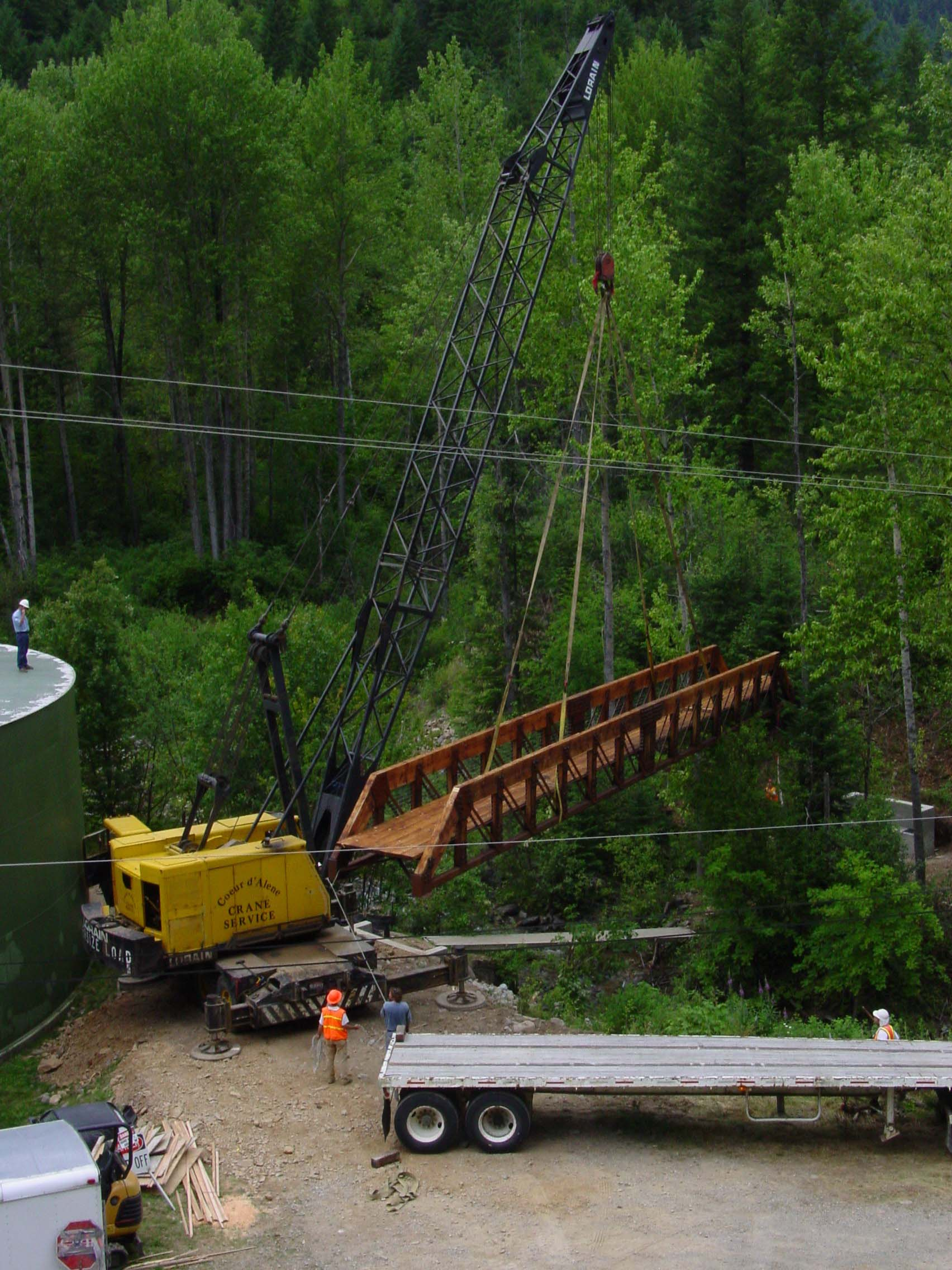
Trail bridge installation

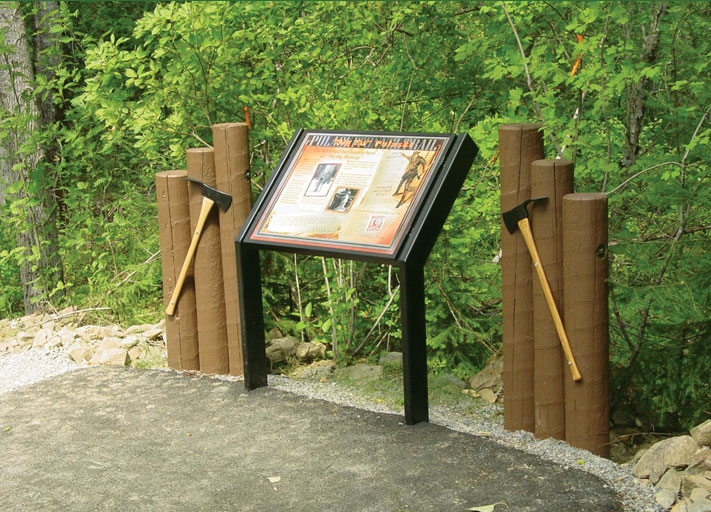
Trail interpretive sign
