= Clarkia, Idaho =

Unincorporated community in the state of Idaho, United States

- Town
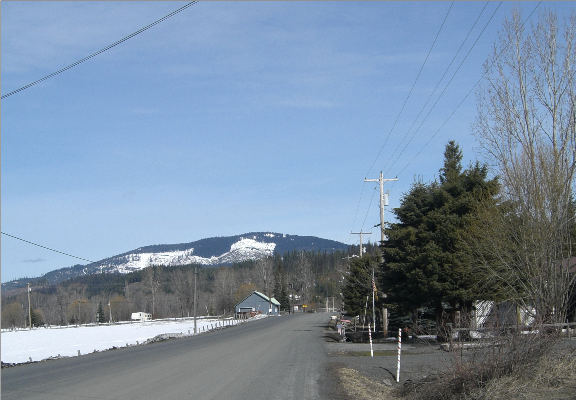
- A view to the north of Clarkia from Poplar St.
- Interactive map of Clarkia, Idaho
- Coordinates: 47°00′39″N 116°15′06″W
- Country: United States
- State: Idaho
- County: Shoshone

Area
  - Total: 45.07 sq mi (116.7 km^{2})
  - Land: 45.07 sq mi (116.7 km^{2})
  - Water: 0 sq mi (0 km^{2})
- Elevation: 2,838 ft (865 m)

Population (2000)
  - Total: 97
  - Density: 2.15/sq mi (0.83/km^{2})
- Time zone: UTC-8 (Pacific Time Zone)
  - Summer (DST): UTC-7
- ZIP code: 83812
- Area code: 208
- GNIS feature ID: 396292

Clarkia is a small unincorporated community in the southwestern corner of Shoshone County, Idaho. It is surrounded by publicly and privately managed forest lands of Douglas-fir, Ponderosa Pine, and Western Larch. Located just to the east of State Highway 3, the town is in the drainage area of the West Fork of the St. Maries River.

== History ==
The Coeur d’Alene people inhabited this area for thousands of years prior to the coming of white settlers. The native name of the area is Chatnna or Meadow. Clarkia is named for Capt. William Clark of the Lewis and Clark expedition. The first residents of the town of Clarkia harvested the Western White Pine in the area for lumber.

Clarkia's population was 60 in 1909, and was estimated at 200 in 1960.

== Demographics ==
The 2000 census recorded a population of 97 with an average household income of $39,375. The median age in Clarkia is 37.8 and the average household size is 2.68. In 2000 the agriculture industry made up 40.5% of the jobs in the area, while educational, health and social services jobs accounted for the next largest segment at 21.4%. Workers for government agencies are the largest class of worker at 47.6%. The city shares a K-8 school district with the communities of Avery and Calder. Currently, all students attend school in the Deary district.

== Physical geography ==
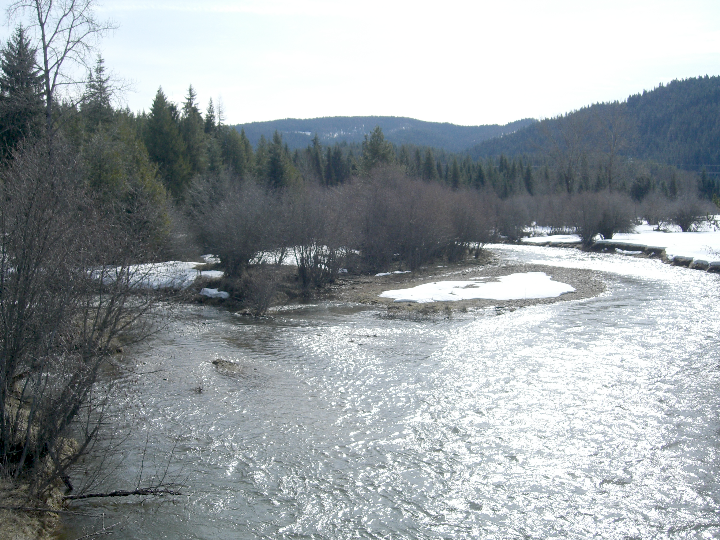
The confluence of the St. Maries River branches near Clarkia, Idaho

Clarkia is located in a flat meadow area which was created by the Miocene Epoch Lake Clarkia. The sediments from this lake contain abundant and well-preserved fossils of mid-Miocene flora and are well exposed at the Fossil Bowl, an open-to-the-public fossil dig and motocross racetrack located on Highway 3 in Clarkia. The West and Middle Forks of the St. Maries River join near Clarkia and run parallel to State Highway 3 in a northwesterly direction to St. Maries. The area is on the eastern edge of the Columbia River Plateau and is to the west of the Bitterroot Mountains.

=== Climate ===
This climatic region is typified by large seasonal temperature differences, with warm to hot (and often humid) summers and cold (sometimes severely cold) winters. According to the Köppen Climate Classification system, Clarkia has a humid continental climate, abbreviated "Dfb" on climate maps.
