= Avery station =

Railway station in Shoshone County, Idaho

Avery
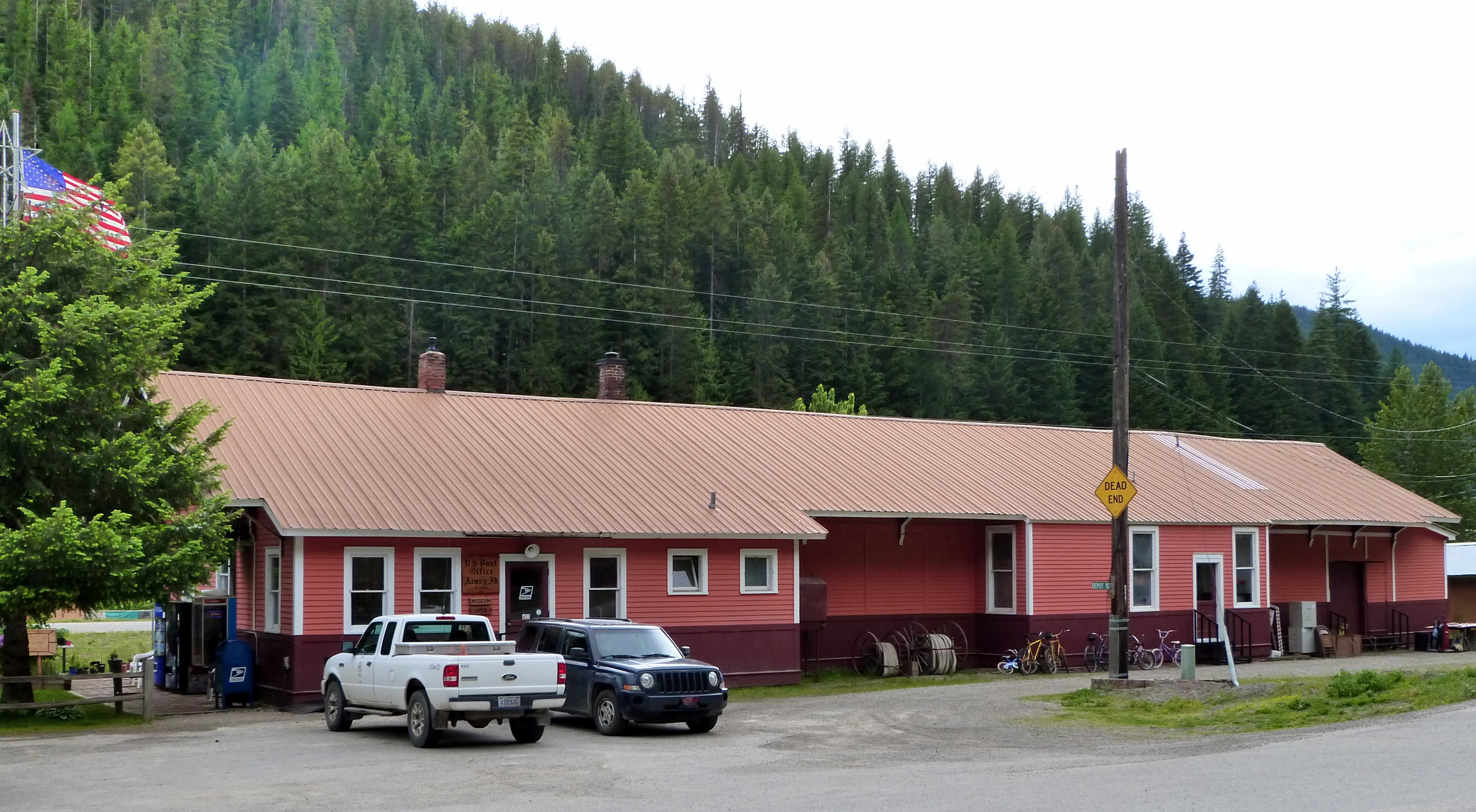
- The Avery Depot in 2015

General information
- Location: 10 Depot Road, Avery, Idaho 83802
- System: Former Milwaukee Road passenger rail station

Construction
- Platform levels: 1

History
- Opened: 1909
- Electrified: 1916-1974

Services
Preceding station	Milwaukee Road	Following station
Ethelton toward Seattle or Tacoma	Main Line	Falcon toward Chicago

Other services
1909-1961 passenger service
- Avery Depot
- U.S. National Register of Historic Places
- Location within Idaho Location within the United States
- Location: Avery, Idaho
- Coordinates: 47°15′03″N 115°48′26″W
- Built: 1909
- Architect: Chicago, Milwaukee and St. Paul Railway
- Architectural style: Craftsman
- MPS: North Idaho 1910 Fire Sites TR
- NRHP reference No.: 84001142
- Added to NRHP: September 20, 1984
Location

The Avery Depot in Avery, Idaho was built by the Chicago, Milwaukee and Puget Sound Railway (also known as The Milwaukee Road) in 1909 as part of its Pacific Extension into the Pacific Northwest from Chicago, Illinois. Avery was the west end of overhead catenary, which allowed electric locomotives to operate instead of steam engines.

The depot is a rectangular single story wood-frame building built in the Craftsman style. At one end is the passenger waiting area with a freight room at the other end. The station agent's office and lunch room ("beanery") are located between the two.

When the railroad went bankrupt in the 1980s, the depot was sold to the town of Avery for use as a community center. Today it serves as a community center, museum, post office and library.

The depot was added to the National Register of Historic Places due to its association with the Great Fire of 1910 as an evacuation site.
