= Ed Pulaski =

U.S. Forest Service ranger (1866–1931)

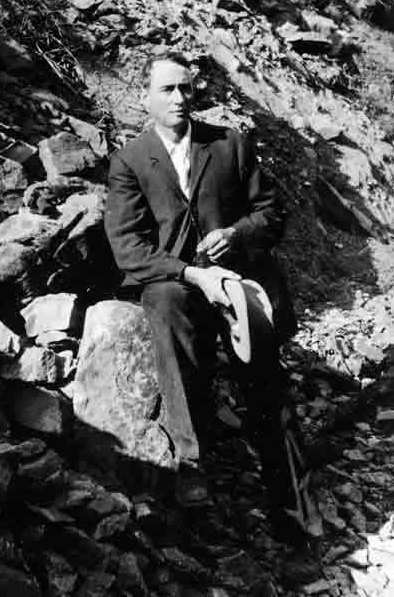
- Born: Edward Crockett Pulaski; February 9, 1866; Green Springs, Seneca County, Ohio
- Died: February 2, 1931 (aged 64); Coeur d'Alene, Idaho
- Resting place: Coeur d'Alene, ID, Forest Cemetery, Section E, Block 40, Lot 6
- Occupation: Forest Ranger
- Employer: U.S. Forest Service

Edward Crockett Pulaski (February 9, 1866 – February 2, 1931) was a U.S. Forest Service ranger based in Wallace, Idaho. Born in Ohio, Pulaski traveled west and worked as a miner, railroad worker, and ranch foreman before joining the Forest Service in 1908. He was reputed to be, and personally claimed that he was, a collateral descendant of Casimir Pulaski.

== Great Fire of 1910 ==
On August 20, 1910, Pulaski was credited with saving all but five of his 45-man crew during the Great Fire of 1910, also known as the "Big Blowup." It had been unusually dry in 1910 and forest fires were rampant across the northern Rockies. Pulaski was supervising crews on the west fork of Placer Creek, about five miles south of Wallace, when the fire suddenly broke out of control, overwhelming the crew.

Drawing on his knowledge of the area and of the dynamics of forest fires, Pulaski led his men to safety in an abandoned prospector's mine. After ordering his crew into the mine tunnel, and knowing the hopelessness of surviving outside until the fire was extinguished, he threatened to shoot with his pistol any man who left. Lying prone on the tunnel floor, all but five of the firefighters survived, though Pulaski himself suffered burns, eye and lung damage, and was temporarily blinded by the fire and smoke. The two horses with them died from smoke inhalation. The mine entrance, now known as the Pulaski Tunnel, is listed on the National Register of Historic Places.

Pulaski remained with the Forest Service until 1929, though the great fire's smoke and flames had damaged his lungs and eyes; during that time he petitioned the government for money to care for the graves of the dozens of firefighters killed by the 1910 fire, and for compensation for his wounds.

== Pulaski firefighting tool ==
Pulaski is widely credited for the invention of the Pulaski in 1911, a hand tool commonly used in wildland firefighting. A combination hand tool with a mattock for digging or grubbing on one side and an axe for chopping on the other, it is often called a "Pulaski tool".

== Legacy ==
Mount Pulaski, a 5,480-foot (1,670 m) peak 1.5 miles (2.4 km) southwest of Wallace, is named for him.

The US Forest Service's Pulaski Tunnel Trail near Wallace, Idaho, provides access to the Nicholson Mine site where Pulaski and his team took shelter.

An initialed ("E.P.") tool, which purportedly belonged to Pulaski himself, is at the Wallace District Mining Museum in Wallace, Idaho in the collection of the Smithsonian Institution.

American Singer-Songwriter Steve Earle wrote and recorded a song that largely recounts the story of Ed Pulaski's heroic actions and invention, "The Firebreak Line". It appears on his 2017 album So You Wannabe An Outlaw.

Pulaski's actions during the Great Fire of 1910 were covered in the Drunk History episode "Good Samaritans."

In Planes: Fire and Rescue, the firetruck character voiced by Patrick Warburton is named "Pulaski" after the tool, or its inventor.

== External links and further information ==
- Surrounded by Forest Fires - My Most Exciting Experience as a Forest Ranger, by E.C. Pulaski
- The 1910 Fires, a history of the Great Fire of 1910 from the Forest History Society website.
- Take a virtual hike to the Pulaski Tunnel - Virtual tour of the Pulaski Tunnel Trail
- VisitIdaho.org - Pulaski Tunnel Trail
- Idaho Forests.org - The Pulaski Project
- Ed Pulaski at Find a Grave
- Edward Pulaski from www.fs.usda.gov
