= Grand Forks, Idaho =

- Grand Forks
- U.S. National Register of Historic Places
- 1910 postcard of Grand Forks

- Location within Idaho
- Nearest city: Avery, Idaho
- Coordinates: 47°21′12″N 115°40′25″W
- Area: 2.5 acres (1.0 ha)
- Built: 1910
- MPS: North Idaho 1910 Fire Sites TR
- NRHP reference No.: 84001175
- Added to NRHP: September 20, 1984

Grand Forks was a town in Shoshone County, Idaho which was destroyed by the Great Fire of 1910. Its site was listed on the National Register of Historic Places in 1984.

It once flourished as a railway town. The site is little-changed since the town was burned. It was deemed "significant as an area that was not reoccupied or altered after that disaster."

It is located east of Avery, Idaho.
