= Hell's Half Acre Lava Field =

Lava plain in Idaho, United States

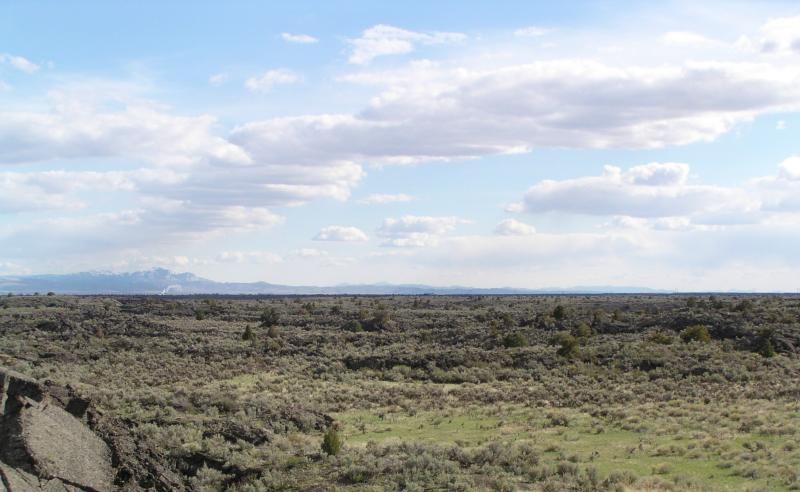
- View of Hell's Half Acre Lava Field

Highest point
- Elevation: 1,631 metres (5,351 ft)
- Coordinates: 43.50°N 112.45°W

Geography
- Location: Bonneville and Bingham counties, Idaho, U.S.

Geology
- Mountain type(s): Shield volcano, lava plain
- Last eruption: 3250 BCE ± 150 years

U.S. National Natural Landmark
- Designated: 1976

Hell's Half Acre Lava Field is a basaltic lava plain located on the Snake River Plain of Idaho in the United States. It is the easternmost of the basaltic lava fields on the Snake River Plain, located about 25 miles (40 km) west of Idaho Falls, Idaho and 30 miles (48 km) north of Pocatello, Idaho. In 1976, the National Park Service designated the northwestern portion of the site a National Natural Landmark. In 1986, the Bureau of Land Management recommended that 68,760 acres (27,830 ha) of the site, located just southeast of the National Natural Landmark, to be a wilderness study area.

== Description of the site ==
The Hell's Half Acre lava plain is located in Bingham and Bonneville counties in the state of Idaho. The site is about 150 square miles (390 km^{2}) in size. The area where a former lava lake existed is marked by a 875-yard (800 m) long by 328-yard (300 m) wide depression near the summit of the lava field. Ten circular pits and two large lava tubes are also located near the summit. Two major lava flows, each about 6.2 miles (10.0 km) long by 3.1 miles (5.0 km) wide, extend from the main lava field to the south and southwest. These two lava flows surround "Morgans Pasture," a kipuka (or older geologic feature which was not covered by lava). More recently, scientists studying aerial photographs of the site discovered a 328-yard (300 m) long eruptive fissure partly buried under lava flows just 437 yards (400 m) from the northwest boundary of the lava field. This and other features of the site indicate that the fissure vent itself may be 11.8 miles (19.0 km) long.

The site is fairly accessible. Interstate 15 just crosses the southeast corner of the lava field. Two trails have been marked by U.S. Bureau of Land Management personnel. The shorter, 0.5-mile-long (0.80 km) trail is marked by blue flags, and takes about 30 minutes to walk. The longer, 4.5-mile-long (7.2 km) trail is marked by red flags, and takes a full day to walk. The latter trail leads to the central vent. A short trail (about 0.75 miles (1.21 km) in length) with educational signage along the way may be accessed from the north parking lot near the Hell's Half Acre rest area on I-15. A second trail (about 1 mile (1.6 km) in length) with educational signage may be accessed from the south parking lot. This longer trail has a gazebo and scenic overlook at about the midpoint. There is also a 0.25-mile-long (0.40 km) handicapped-accessible paved loop with educational signage as well. All trails are closed in winter. Over 100,000 people used the trails in 2007.

The Hell's Half Acre lava plain is home to a variety of plant species. Among them are bitterbrush, bluebunch wheatgrass, foothills death camas, evening primrose, ferns, geraniums, gray rabbitbrush, Indian paintbrush, needle-and-thread grass, penstemon, prickly pear cactus, sagebrush, Utah juniper, and wild onion. Wildlife is also abundant. Species commonly found here include bobcats, coyotes, golden eagles, mule deer, elk, prairie falcons, pronghorn, red foxes, red-tailed hawks, and sage grouse.

== History of the site ==
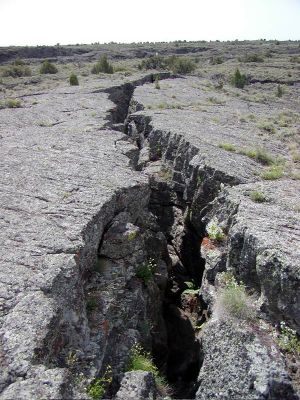
A rift in the lava plain at Hell's Half Acre in Idaho.

Geologists estimate that the Hell's Acre Lava Field was created about 3250 BC. The lava field was created by the Lava Ridge-Hell's Half Acre fissure vent, and marks the southern edge of this area of volcanic activity. This fissure vent was created when one or more magmatic dikes (sheets or tubes of magma cutting across the existing geologic features) found their way to the surface. At the northwestern edge of the lava field is a basaltic volcano, with the fissure vent extending toward the southeast and the Hell's Half Acre site. The basaltic volcano is a shield type. Pit craters and spatter cones follow this active fissure line. Two non-erupting fissures extend northwest from the shield volcano for about 2.7 miles (4.3 km). One scientific team hypothesized that the seven lava fields in the vicinity of Hell's Half Acre may belong to as few as two fissure vents.

Hell's Half Acre was created when basaltic pāhoehoe quickly flowed out of the volcanic rift. At least eight lava lobes have been identified by geologists. As magma and volcanic gases drained from underneath the lava field, the field subsided—leaving behinds hummocks, or "hills" of lava (a feature which Hell's Half Acre retains today). There is evidence that lava filled and drained the lava lake numerous times, and that lava repeatedly overflowed the lake.

Lava from the fissure vent tended to flow downhill toward the southeast, covering part of the fissure. Lava tubes extend in a generally southeastern direction under the lava field, and surfaced in the far southeastern corner of the site. There is also evidence that later pāhoehoe lava lobes ran underneath or inside existing lobes, and then broke out.

The current name of the lava field was given to it by fur traders in the early 19th century seeking passage through the rough terrain of the Rocky Mountains. The term "hell's half acre" was a commonly used expression to describe any rough land. One of the first white people to record their visit to Hell's Half Acre was Benjamin Bonneville, a French-born United States Army officer. Bonneville traveled west in 1832, on a leave of absence from the military. His expedition was financed by the wealthy fur trader, John Jacob Astor. Bonneville saw the site in 1833. The celebrated writer Washington Irving used Bonneville's journals to write a book about the expedition, and based on his descriptions wrote about the area this way:

Here occur some of the wild and striking phenomena of this wild and sublime region. The plain is gashed with numerous and dangerous chasms, from four to ten feet wide, and of great depth. Captain Bonneville attempted to sound some of these openings, but without any satisfactory results. A stone dropped into one of them reverberated against the sides for apparently a great depth.

In the late 19th century and early 20th century, the area was the center of logging activity. Red cedar grew abundantly in the lava field, as the plant can grow directly on rock. In 1889, the village of Woodville was founded near the Woodville Bend of the Snake River (near the modern town of Shelley, Idaho). The Woodville settlers harvested large amounts of red cedar for use as lumber and fuel. These practices were significantly cut back in the 1910s and 1920s as coal became more widely available as a fuel, but the harvesting of red cedar from Hell's Half Acre continued until 1942.

A wildfire burned 500 acres (200 ha) of the site in 1999. In the fall of 2005, Michael Curtis Reynolds was arrested at the Hell's Half Acre rest area after the Federal Bureau of Investigation lured him there with the promise of money and arms from a supporter. More recently, in 2006 the utility Utah Power tried to build an electrical substation near the easternmost part of Hell's Half Acre lava field.

The Lava Trail System ("formerly Hell's Half Acre") provides pedestrian access to the lava field.

== Bibliography ==
- Alt, David D. and Hyndman, Donald W. Roadside Geology of Idaho. Missoula, Mont.: Mountain Press Pub. Co., 1989.
- Blevins, Winfred. Dictionary of the American West. Seattle, Wash.: Sasquatch Books, 2001.
- Bureau of Land Management. Eastern Idaho Proposed MFP Amendment and Final Environmental Impact Statement, Wilderness. Eastern Idaho Wilderness Study. Bureau of Land Management, Idaho Falls District, U.S. Department of the Interior. 1986.
- Fanselow, Julie. Idaho: Off the Beaten Path. Guilford, Conn.: Globe Pequot Press, 2006.
- "Fire Burns 500 Acres of Brush Near Arco." Idaho Falls Post Register. September 7, 1999.
- Fisher, Vardis and Holmes, Opal Laurel. Gold Rushes and Mining Camps of the Early American West. Caldwell, Id.: Caxton Printers, 1979.
- Garrison, Greg. "Take a Walk on the Wild Side—Spotting Native Plants." Idaho Falls Post Register. June 11, 2003.
- Gulick, Bill. Snake River Country. Caldwell, Id.: Caxton Printers, 1978.
- Hammer, C.G. "The Lure of Lavas." Idaho Falls Post Register. June 1, 2003.
- Kricher, John C. A Field Guide to Rocky Mountain and Southwest Forests. Boston: Houghton Mifflin Co., 1998.
- Kuntz, Mel A.; Spiker, Elliott C.; Rubin, Meyer; Champion, Duane E.; and Lefebvre, Richard H. "Radiocarbon Studies of Latest Pleistocene and Holocene Lava Flows of the Snake River Plain, Idaho: Data, Lessons, Interpretations." Quaternary Research. 25:2 (February 1986).
- Link, P.K. and Mink, Leland L. Geology, Hydrogeology, and Environmental Remediation: Idaho National Engineering and Environmental Laboratory, Eastern Snake River Plain, Idaho. Boulder, Colo.: Geological Society of America, 2001.
- Lubrano, Alfred. "Web Sleuth Testifies in Terror Trial." Philadelphia Inquirer. July 10, 2007.
- Nielsen, Erik. "Landowner Protesting Utah Power Substation." Idaho Falls Post Register. July 13, 2006.
- Purple, Edwin Ruthven and Owens, Kenneth N. Perilous Passage: A Narrative of the Montana Gold Rush, 1862-1863. Helena, Mont.: Montana Historical Society Press, 1996.
- "Sci-Fi Flick to Start Filming Near Casper." Idaho Falls Post Register. March 21, 1996.
- Spilde, Tony. "Idaho's Cool Rest Areas." Idaho Falls Post Register. June 9, 2000.
- Wilson, James R. Field Guide to Geologic Excursions in Utah and Adjacent Areas of Nevada, Idaho and Wyoming. Salt Lake City: Utah Geological Survey, 1992.
