= Lava field =

Large, mostly flat area of lava flows

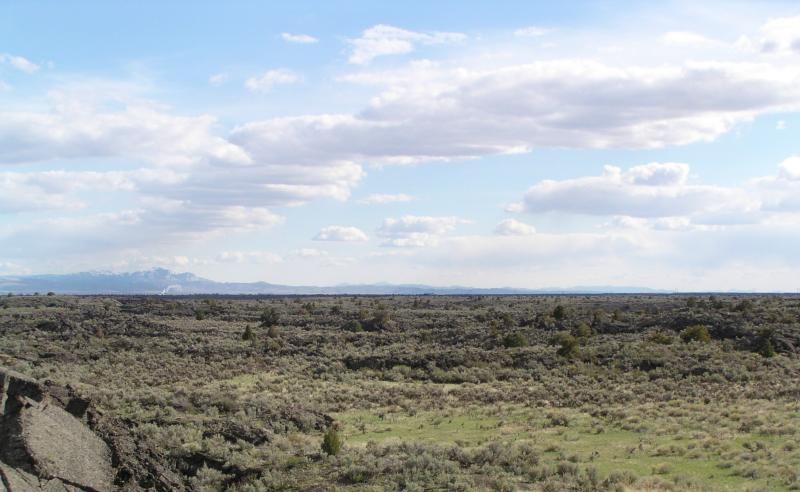
Hell's Half Acre Lava Field, Idaho, United States of America.

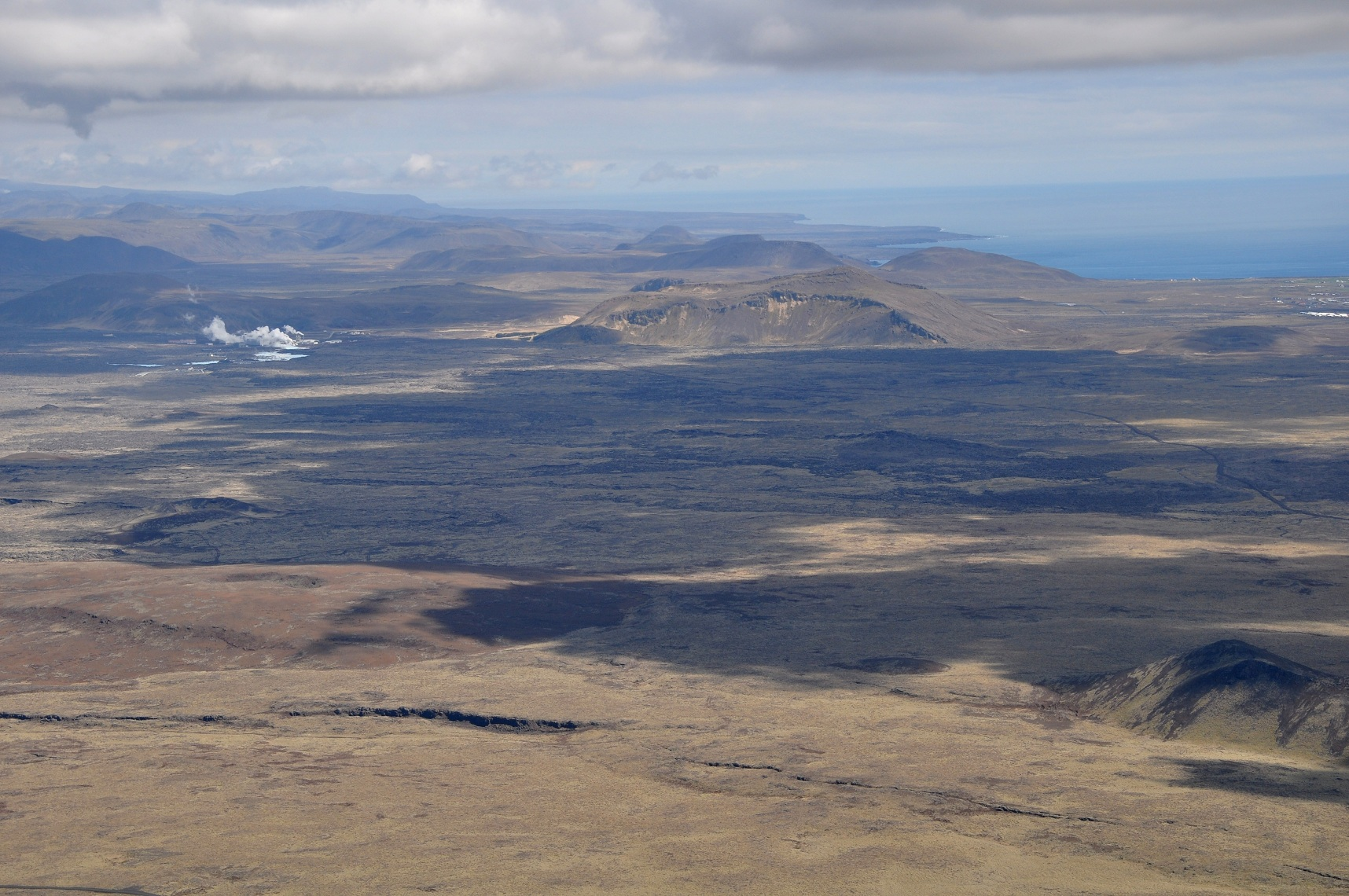
Barren waste of lava fields at Reykjanes Peninsula, Iceland.

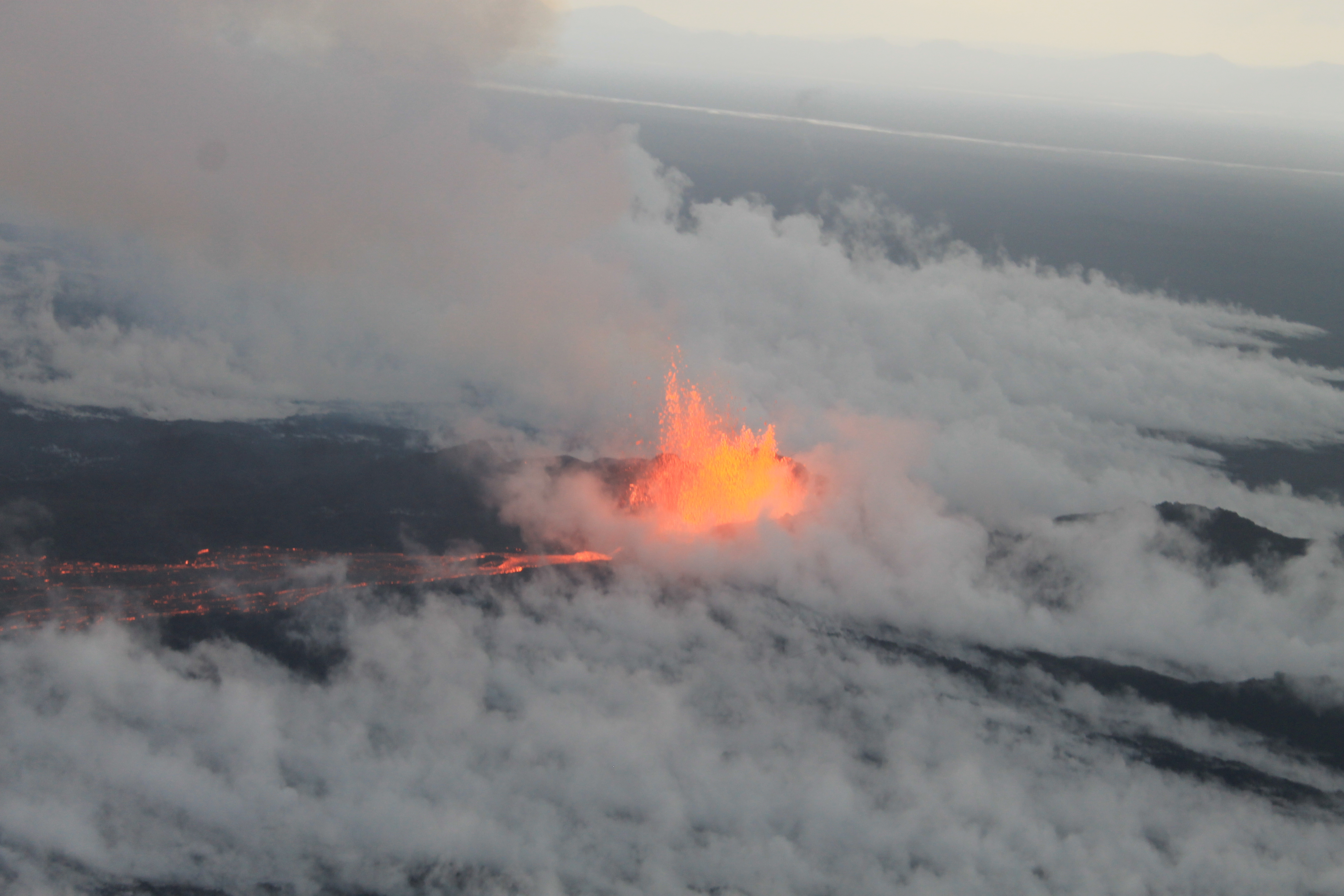
Degassing Holuhraun lava field with fountaining at crater Baugur, Iceland, Sept. 2014

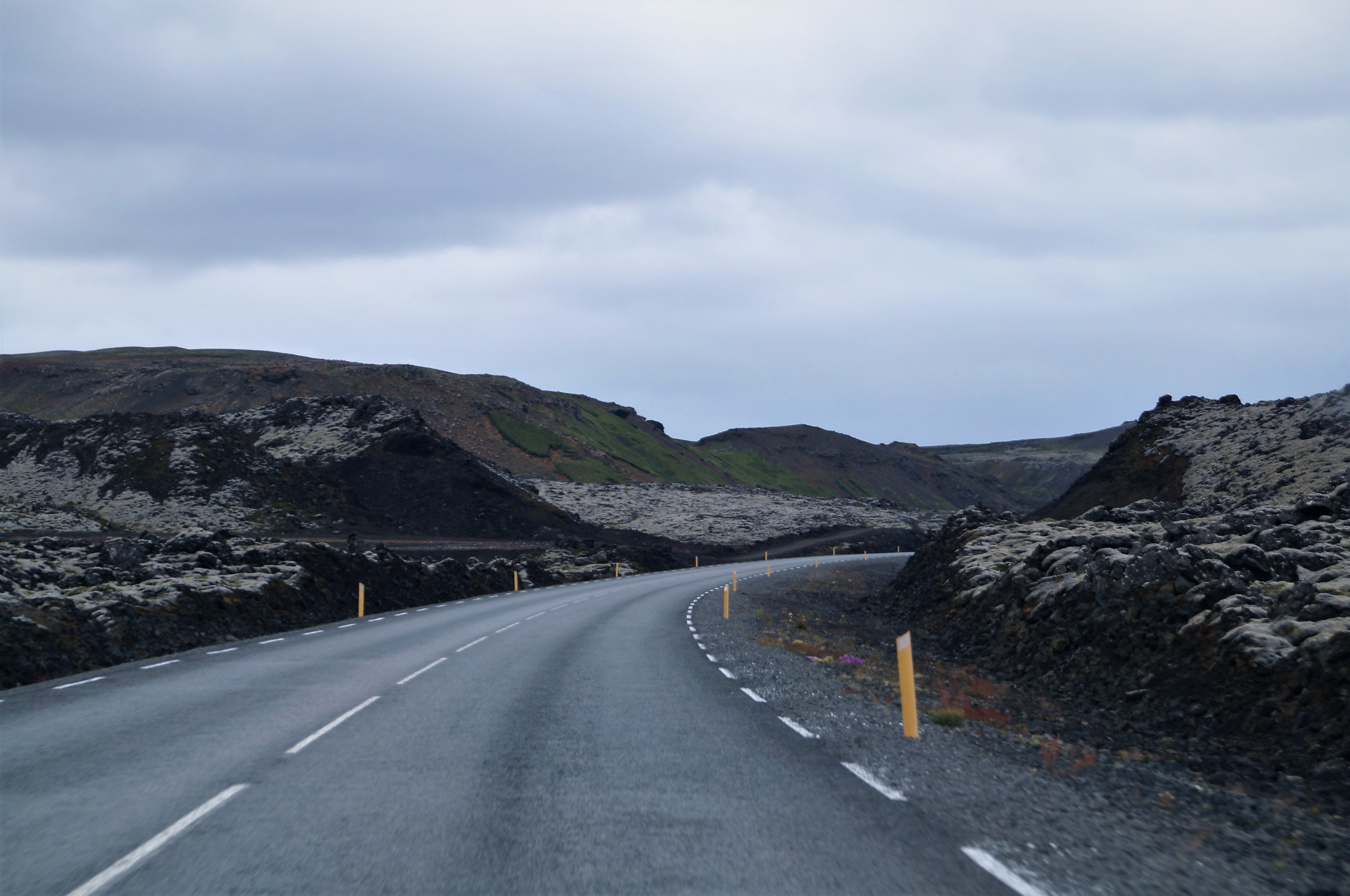
Ögmundarhraun lava fields in Iceland caused by eruption in 1151 AD

A lava field, sometimes called a lava bed, is a large, mostly flat area of lava flows. Such features are generally composed of highly fluid basalt lava, and can extend for tens or hundreds of kilometers across the underlying terrain.

== Morphology and structure ==
The final morphology of a lava field can reveal properties such as internal structure, composition, and mechanics of the lava flow when it was fluid. The ridges and patterns on top of the lava field show the direction of the lava channels and the often active lava tubes that may be underneath the solidified "crust." It can also reveal whether the lava flow can be classified as pāhoehoe or 'a'ā. The two main types of lava field structures are defined as sheet flow lava and pillow lava. Sheet flow lava appears like a wrinkled or folded sheet, while pillow lava is bulbous, and often looks like a pile of pillows atop one another.

An important aspect of lava flow morphology is a phenomenon known as lava flow inflation. This occurs in pāhoehoe flows that have a high effusion rate, and initially forms a thin crust atop the lava flow. The fluid lava underneath the crust continues to increase due to the sustained high effusion rate, and thus the entire "structure" increases in size, up to four meters in height. This anomaly can expose important physics and mechanisms behind lava flow that was not previously known.

The structure of lava fields also vary based on geographic location. For example, in subaqueous lava fields, sheet flow lava is found near volcanoes characterized by fast-flowing centers, like the Galapagos Rift, while on the other hand pillow lava fields are found near more slow-flowing centers, like the Mid-Atlantic Ridge.

== Mapping and prediction ==
The extent of large lava fields is most readily studied from the air or in satellite photos, where their commonly dark, near-black color contrasts sharply with the rest of the landscape. Current computer models are mostly unable to predict the placement of lava fields due to the inability to anticipate random environmental influences. Computer modeling is consistently increasing in quality, but the many micro factors directing lava flow and shape, such as source geometry and lava extrusion rate, limit the accuracy that is currently available.

== Notable examples ==
- Boring Lava Field (United States)
- Harrat Rahat, which threatened the city of Medina in the 13th century (Saudi Arabia)
- Hell's Half Acre Lava Field (Idaho, United States)
- Reykjanes, Iceland (peninsula is mainly a barren waste of lava fields)
- St. George, Utah, United States (city built around fields and bluffs covered in lava rocks)
- Mackenzie Large Igneous Province, Canada

== See also ==
- Volcanic field
- Volcanic plateau
- Volcanism of Hawaii
- Volcanism of Iceland
- Volcano
