= Cedar sculpin =

Conservation status
- Vulnerable (NatureServe)

Scientific classification
- Kingdom: Animalia
- Phylum: Chordata
- Class: Actinopterygii
- Order: Perciformes
- Suborder: Cottoidei
- Family: Cottidae
- Genus: Cottus
- Species: C. schitsuumsh

Binomial name
- Cottus schitsuumsh M. Lemoine, M. K. Young, McKelvey, L. Eby, K. L. Pilgrim & M. K. Schwartz, 2014

Species of fish

The Cedar sculpin (Cottus schitsuumsh) is a small, large-headed species of freshwater ray-finned fish belonging to the family Cottidae, the typical sculpins. This species is found in the Coeur d'Alene and St. Joe rivers in northern Idaho, and in a stretch of the Clark Fork river in western Montana. It is a common species of streams with cobble and gravel bottoms and cool to cold water.
