= Hobo Cedar Grove Botanical Area =

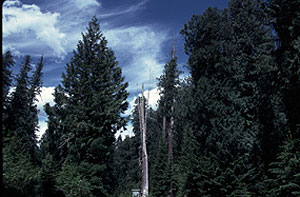

- Location within Idaho
- Location: St. Joe National Forest, Idaho
- Nearest city: Clarkia
- Coordinates: 47.0911°N 116.127°W
- Area: 240 acres (97 ha)

U.S. National Natural Landmark
- Designated: 1980

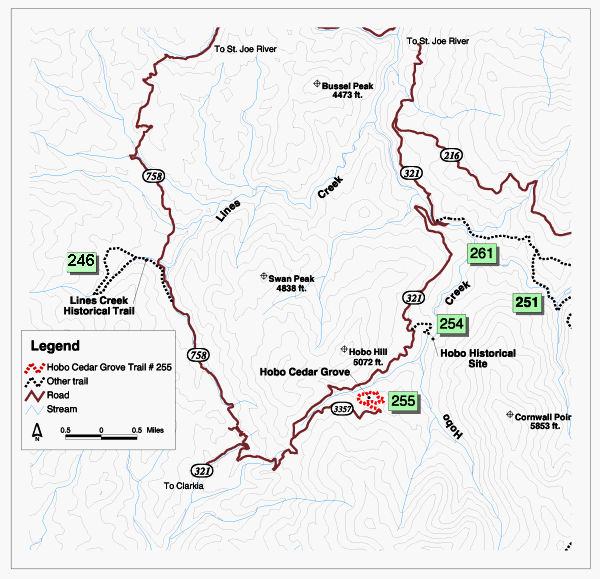
Hobo Grove Map

Hobo Cedar Grove Botanical Area is located near Clarkia in the St. Joe National Forest of Idaho in the northwestern United States. The grove is a 240-acre (97 ha) area containing old growth Western Red Cedar estimated to be 500 years old. The upper area contains Western Red Cedar surrounded by Oregon boxwood (Pachistima myrsinites). The lower portion of the area contain the giant cedars surrounded by Lady-fern. The forest was designated a National Natural Landmark in 1980.

There is a self-guided interpretive tour for the area which has over a mile and a half of trails. There are cedar log benches and picnic facilities. There are numerous camping facilities in the area, which is located between St. Maries and Clarkia, Idaho about sixty miles south of Coeur d'Alene, Idaho.
