= Avery, Idaho =

Unincorporated community in the state of Idaho, United States

- Unincorporated community
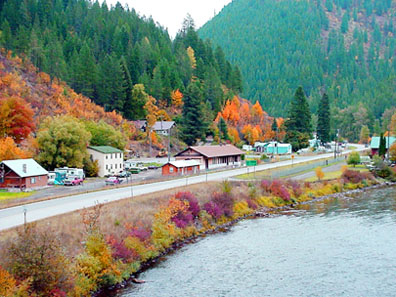
- Avery and St. Joe River in the fall

- Location within Idaho Location within the United States
- Coordinates: 47°15′00″N 115°48′35″W
- Country: United States
- State: Idaho
- County: Shoshone
- Elevation: 2,486 ft (758 m)

Population (2000)
  - Total: 25
- Time zone: UTC-8 (Pacific Time Zone)
  - Summer (DST): UTC-7
- ZIP code: 83802
- Area code: 208
- GNIS feature ID: 396059

Avery is a small unincorporated community in the northwest United States, located in the St. Joe River Valley in Shoshone County, Idaho. Avery is located in the middle of the St. Joe District of the Idaho Panhandle National Forest, and is a tourist attraction in the Idaho Panhandle known for its wilderness and outdoor recreation. It is upstream and east of St. Maries, the county seat of Benewah County.

== Geography ==
=== Climate ===
This climatic region is typified by large seasonal temperature differences, with warm to hot (and often humid) summers and cold (sometimes severely cold) winters. According to the Köppen Climate Classification system, Avery has a humid continental climate, abbreviated "Dfb" on climate maps.

== Demographics ==
As of 2013, Avery had a population of 25 permanent residents. The temporary population is higher in the summer due to seasonal workers for the United States Forest Service and the many summer homes in Avery and along the St. Joe River. The small population is served by the Avery School District, also serving Calder, Idaho and Clarkia, Idaho.

== History ==
The town was established in 1906. From 1909 to 1980, Avery was a division point on the Pacific Extension of the Chicago, Milwaukee, St. Paul and Pacific Railroad ("Milwaukee Road"). It was also once the western terminus for the easternmost of two electrified mountain sections on the route; the other ran in Washington from Othello, through the Cascade Range to the Puget Sound. Electric operations ran from 1914 to 1974 on this section east to Harlowton, Montana. Trains stopped at the Avery Depot, now listed on the National Register of Historic Places. Here, steam or diesel locomotives were changed or hooked up to electric locomotives.

Japanese railroad workers were based in Avery during the line's construction. Most were transient workers and left soon after the rail was completed.

During the Great Fire of 1910, a 28-man firefighting team died near Setzer Creek outside of Avery. The U.S. Army's 25th Infantry Regiment (known as the Buffalo Soldiers) helped build a back fire that saved Avery. During the fire, many found refuge in the newly-constructed railroad tunnels between Avery and the St. Paul Pass Tunnel (a.k.a. Taft Tunnel) to the northeast.

Avery's population was 450 in 1960.

With ongoing financial problems which worsened in the 1970s, the Milwaukee Road abandoned its right-of-way in the West in 1980, but the tunnels and grades east of Avery are now a rail trail route for hikers and bicyclists, the Route of the Hiawatha Trail.
