= Great Fire of 1910 =

Wildfire in the northwestern United States

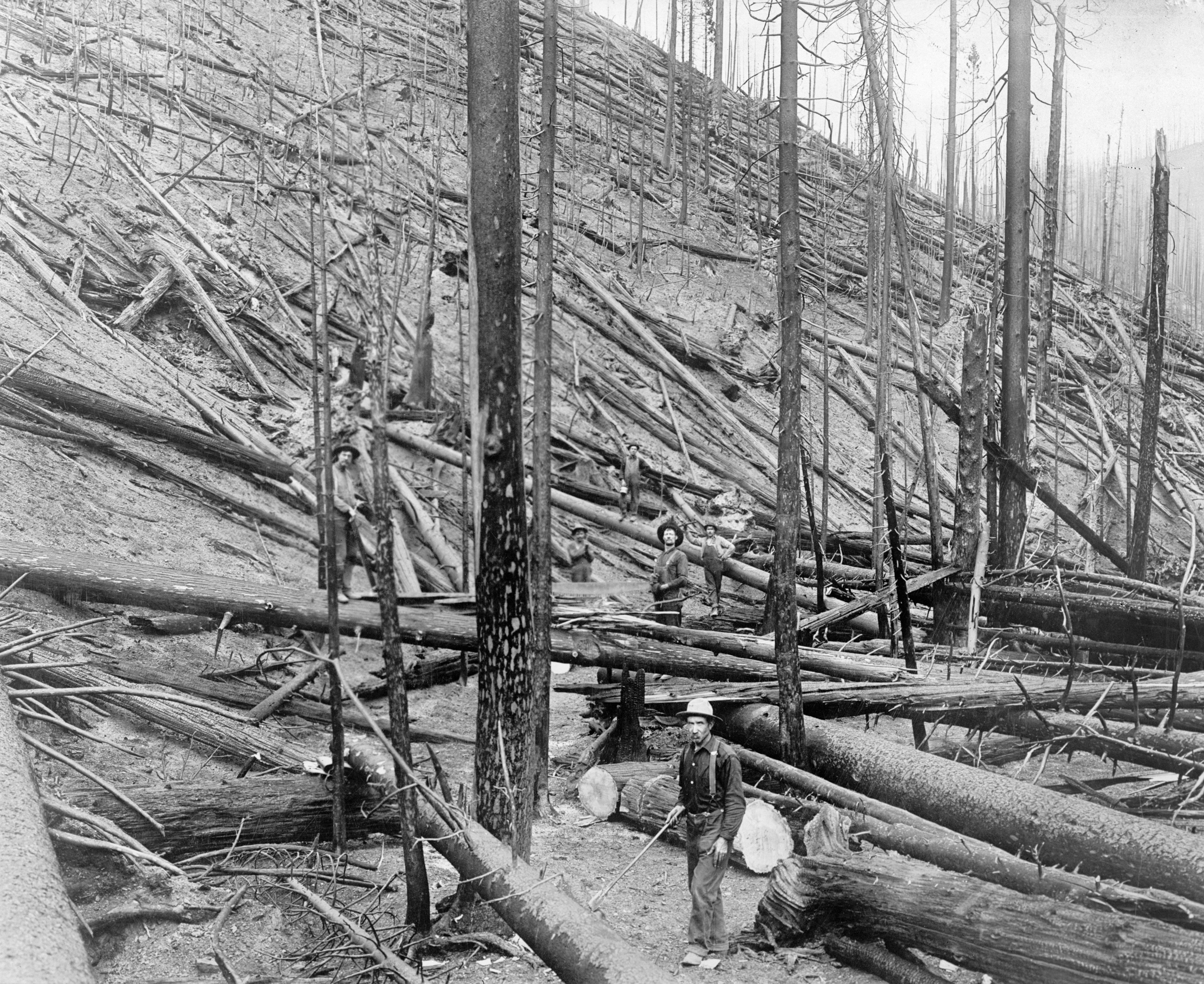
- A pine forest on the Little North Fork of the St. Joe River, Idaho, after the fire
- Date: August 20–21, 1910
- Location: Idaho, Montana, and Washington, United States; British Columbia, Canada

Statistics
- Burned area: 3,000,000 acres (4,700 mi^{2}; 12,100 km^{2})
- Land use: Logging, mining, railroads

Impacts
- Deaths: 87
- Injuries: Unknown
- Cost: Unknown

Ignition
- Cause: Not officially determined

Location in the United States

Perimeter of Great Fire of 1910 (map data)

The Great Fire of 1910 (also commonly referred to as the Big Blowup, the Big Burn, or the Devil's Broom fire) was a wildfire in the Inland Northwest region of the United States which burned three million acres (4,700 sq mi; 12,100 km^{2}) in Northern Idaho and Western Montana in the summer of 1910, with extensions into Eastern Washington and Southeast British Columbia. The area burned included large parts of the Bitterroot, Cabinet, Clearwater, Coeur d'Alene, Flathead, Kaniksu, Kootenai, Lewis and Clark, Lolo, and St. Joe national forests. The fire burned over two days on the weekend of August 20–21, after strong winds caused numerous smaller fires to combine into a firestorm of unprecedented size. It killed 87 people, mostly firefighters, destroyed numerous humanmade structures, including several entire towns, and burned more than three million acres of forest with an estimated one billion dollars' worth of timber lost. While the exact cause of the fire is often debated, according to various U.S. Forest Service sources, the primary cause of the Big Burn was a combination of severe drought and a series of lightning storms that ignited hundreds of small fires across the Northern Rockies. Ignition sources also likely included human activity such as from railroads, homesteaders, and loggers. It is believed to be the largest, although not the deadliest, forest fire in U.S. history.

In the aftermath of the fire, the U.S. Forest Service received considerable recognition for its firefighting efforts, including a doubling of its budget from Congress. The outcome was to highlight wildland firefighters as heroes while raising public awareness of national nature conservation. The fire is often considered a significant impetus in the development of early wildfire prevention and suppression strategies.

== Background ==
A number of factors contributed to the destruction caused by the Great Fire of 1910. The wildfire season started early that year because the winter of 1909–1910 and the spring and summer of 1910 were extremely dry, and the summer sufficiently hot to have been described as "like no others." The drought resulted in forests with abundant dry fuel, in an area which had previously experienced dependable autumn and winter moisture. Hundreds of fires were ignited by hot cinders flung from locomotives, sparks, lightning, and backfiring crews. By mid-August, there were an estimated 1,000 to 3,000 individual fires burning in Idaho, Montana, and Washington.

== Progression ==
Saturday, August 20, 1910, brought hurricane-force winds to the interior northwest, whipping the hundreds of small fires into one or two much larger blazing infernos. Such a conflagration was impossible to fight; there were too few men and supplies. The United States Forest Service (then called the National Forest Service) was only five years old at the time and unprepared for the possibilities of the dry summer or a fire of this magnitude, although throughout the summer it had been urgently recruiting as many men as possible to fight the hundreds of fires already burning. Many of these recruits had little forestry or firefighting experience. Earlier in August, President William Howard Taft had authorized the addition of military troops to the effort, and 4,000 troops, including seven companies from the U.S. Army's 25th Infantry Regiment (known as the Buffalo Soldiers), were brought in to help fight the fires burning in the northern Rockies. The arrival of the Buffalo Soldiers troops almost doubled the black population of Idaho.

Smoke from the fire was said to have been seen as far east as Watertown, New York, and as far south as Denver, Colorado. It was reported that, at night, five hundred miles (800 km) out into the Pacific Ocean, ships could not navigate by the stars because the sky was cloudy with smoke.

The extreme scorching heat of the sudden inferno has been attributed to the expansive Western white pine forests that covered much of northern Idaho at the time, due to their flammable sap.

The fire was finally extinguished when another cold front swept in, bringing steady rain and some early snowfall.

== Effects ==
=== Casualties ===
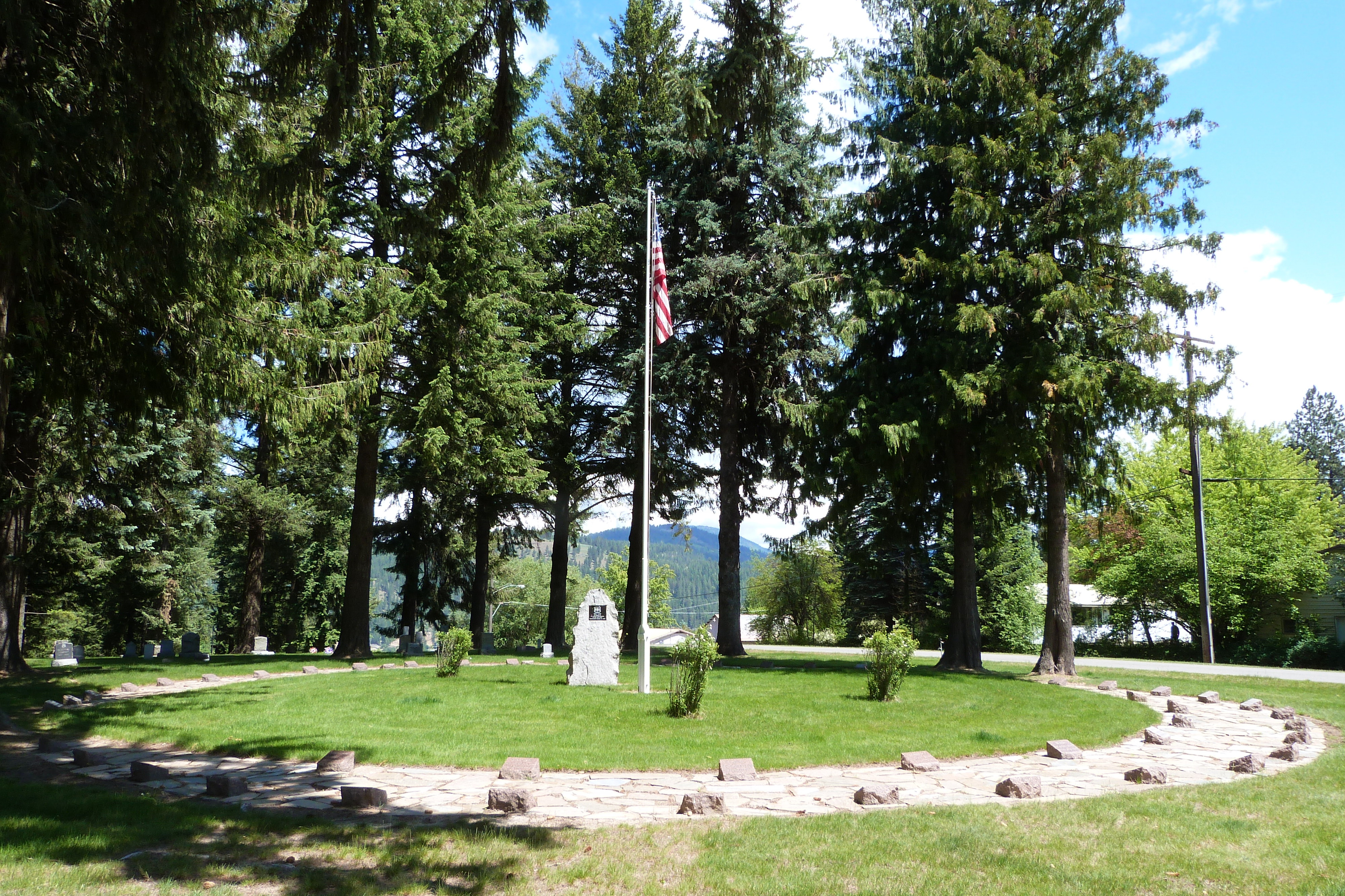
Memorial to fallen firefighters of 1910; at Woodlawn Cemetery in St. Maries, Idaho (47.3155°N 116.5866°W)

At least 78 firefighters were killed while trying to control the fire, not including those firefighters who died after the fire from smoke damage to their lungs. The entire 28-man "Lost Crew" was overcome by flames and perished on Setzer Creek outside of Avery, Idaho. It remains the second deadliest incident in the history of firefighting in the United States, only being surpassed by the September 11 attacks.

Perhaps the most famous story of survival is that of Ranger Ed Pulaski, a U.S. Forest Service ranger who led a large crew of about 44 men to safety in an abandoned prospect mine outside of Wallace, Idaho, just as they were about to be overtaken by the fire. It is said that Pulaski fought off the flames at the mouth of the shaft until he passed out like the others. Around midnight, a man announced that he, at least, was getting out of there. Knowing that they would have no chance of survival if they ran, Pulaski drew his pistol, threatening to shoot the first person who tried to leave. In the end, all but five of the forty or so men survived. Pulaski has since been widely celebrated as a hero for his efforts; the mine tunnel in which he and his crew sheltered from the fire, now known as the Pulaski Tunnel, is listed on the National Register of Historic Places.

=== Damage ===
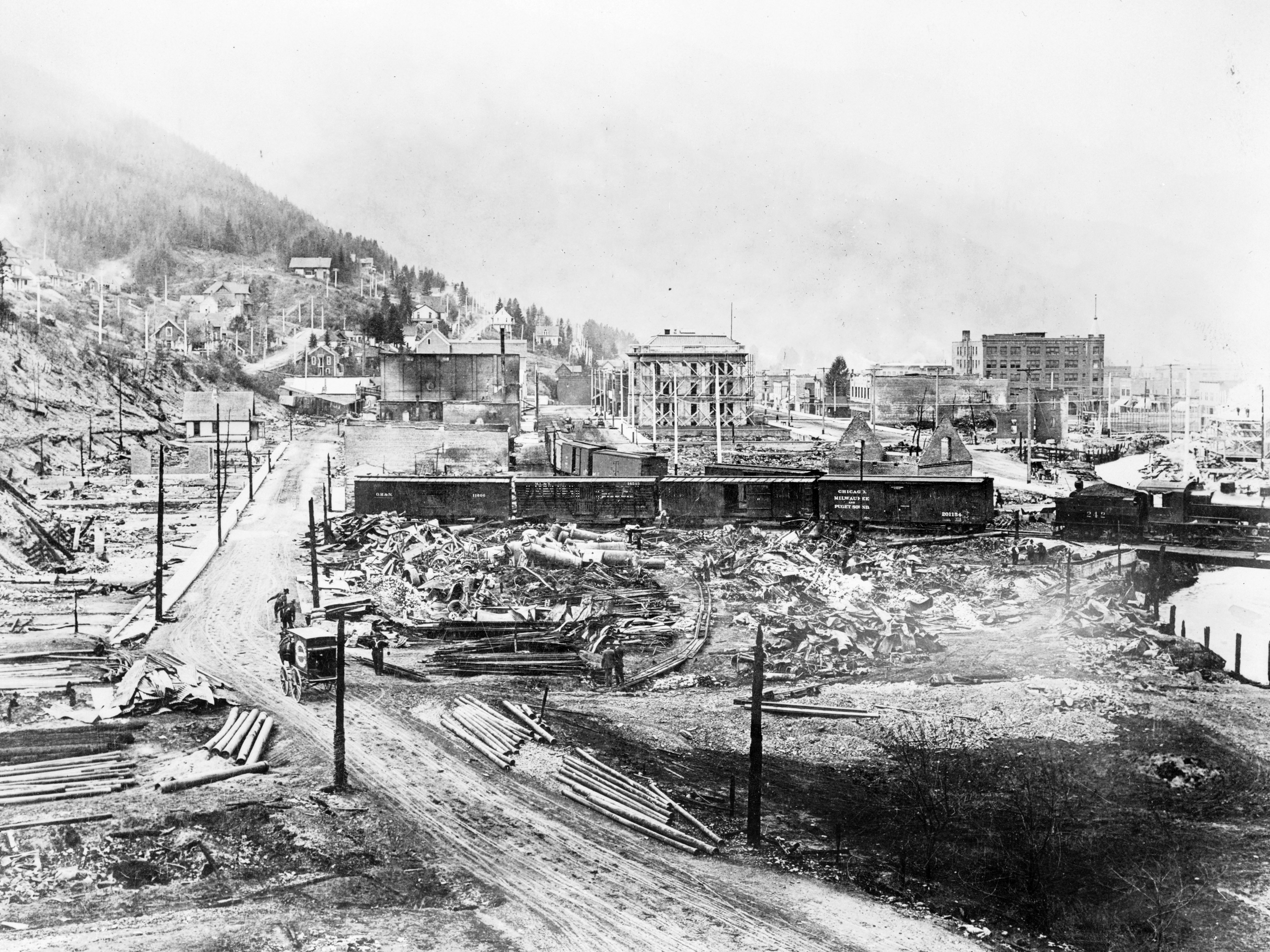
Wallace after the Big Blowup

Several towns were completely destroyed by the fire:

- Idaho:
  - Falcon
  - Grand Forks
- Montana:
  - De Borgia
  - Haugan
  - Henderson
  - Taft
  - Tuscor

In Idaho, one-third of the town of Wallace was burned to the ground, with an estimated $1 million in damage (equivalent to $31,490,000 in 2023). Passenger trains evacuated thousands of Wallace residents to Spokane and Missoula. Another train with 1,000 people from Avery took refuge in a tunnel after racing across a burning trestle. Other towns with severe damage included Burke, Kellogg, Murray, and Osburn, all in Idaho. The towns of Avery, Saltese (MT), as well as a major part of Wallace, were saved by backfires. Smoke from the fire reportedly traveled as far to the east as New York City, and as far south as Dallas.

== Legacy ==
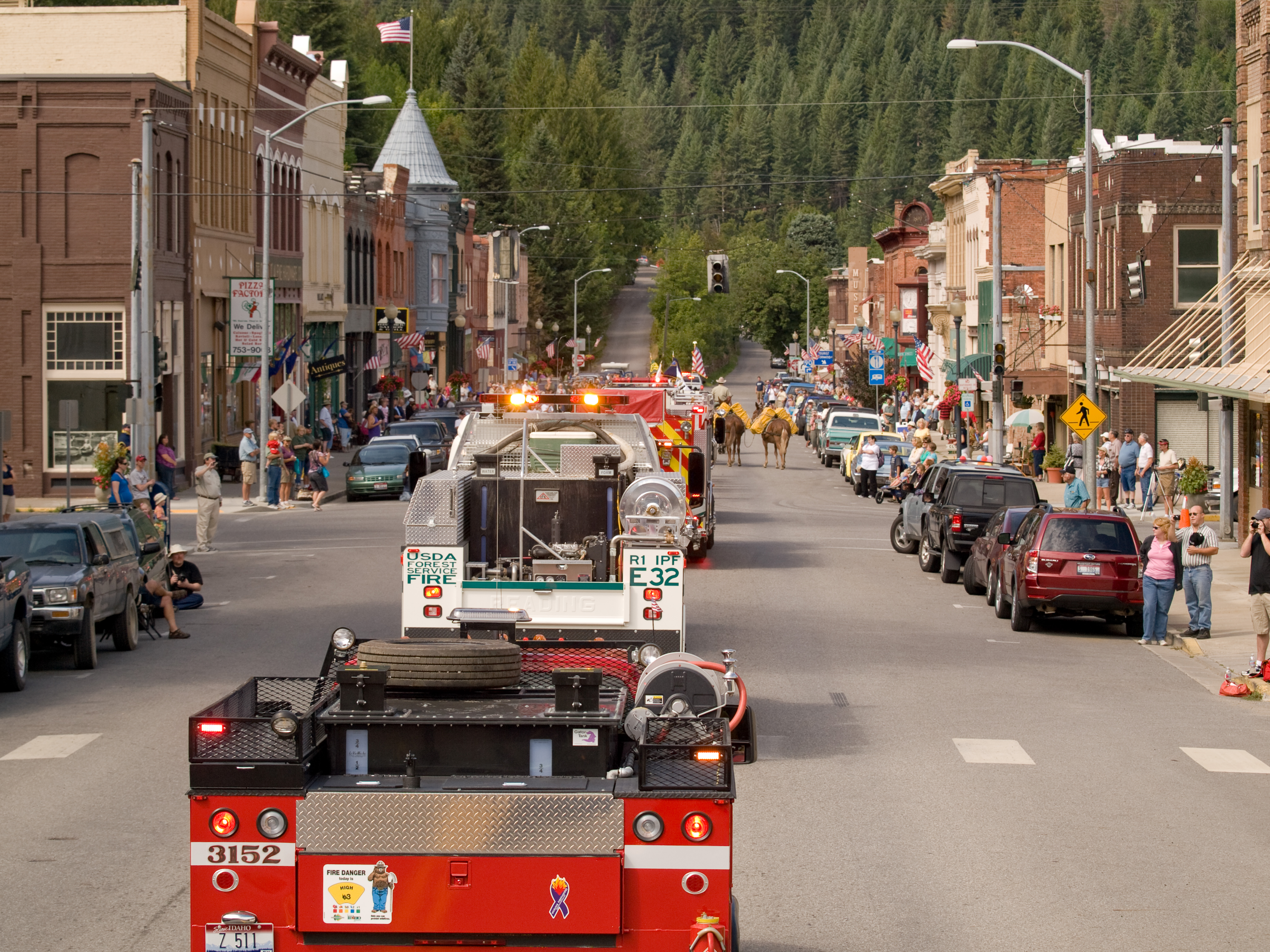
The Centennial commemoration in Wallace, Idaho

The Great Fire of 1910 cemented and shaped the U.S. Forest Service, which at the time was a newly established department on the verge of cancellation, facing opposition from mining and forestry interests. Before the epic conflagration, there were many debates about the best way to handle forest fires—whether to let them burn because they were a part of nature and were expensive to fight, or to fight them in order to protect the forests.

The Forest Service had instituted a policy of extinguishing all fires as quickly as possible in 1908. That strategy was called into question after the Great Fire, but Fire Chief Henry Graves, the second Chief Forester for the Forest Service, doubled down following the Big Burn, calling for a more aggressive fire prevention policy. He launched a campaign to remove fire from the landscape. His efforts would lead to the creation of the Weeks Act, which called for cooperation among federal, state and private agencies to address fire protection. The Weeks Act has been credited with saving nearly 20 million acres of forestland.

One of the people who fought the fire, Ferdinand Silcox, went on to become the fifth chief of the Forest Service. Influenced by the devastation of the Big Burn, Silcox promoted the "10 a.m." policy, with the goal of suppressing all fires by 10 a.m. of the day following their report. It was decided that the Forest Service was to prevent and battle every wildfire.

== In popular culture ==
The Great Fire is a central theme in the 2011 book Train Dreams by Denis Johnson and the 2025 movie based on it.

"The Devil's Broom," a story in Jim Shepard's collection The Queen of Bad Influences, gives a detailed view of The Great Fire highlighting Ed Pulaski, a U.S. Forest Service ranger.

== See also ==
- Avery Depot, a train depot in Avery, Idaho used as an evacuation site
- Baudette fire of 1910
- Fire weather
- Great Fire of Spokane City, 1889
- Pulaski, a firefighting tool later designed by and named for Ed Pulaski
- Yacolt Burn
