= Crater Rings (Idaho) =

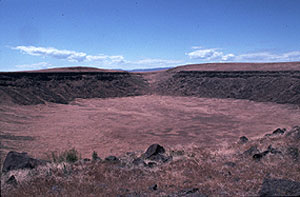
- Crater Rings

Highest point
- Coordinates: 43.1907°N 115.8597°W

Geography
- Location: Elmore County, Idaho, United States
- Topo map: USGS Crater Rings

Geology
- Rock age: Less than 2 million years
- Mountain type: volcanic craters of a Shield Volcano

U.S. National Natural Landmark
- Designated: 1980

Crater Rings are adjacent, symmetrical volcanic pit craters in the Western Snake River Plain about eight miles northwest of Mountain Home, Idaho. They are one of few examples of volcanic craters in the continental United States. The craters are at the summit of a broad shield volcano. The eastern crater is about 3000 ft across and 350 ft deep. The western is 2500 ft across and 300 ft deep. The craters are probably former lava lakes similar to Halemaʻumaʻu of the Kīlauea volcano of Hawaii. The volcano is the youngest of the shield volcanoes near Mountain Home and is estimated to be less than two million years old.

Crater Rings are a National Natural Landmark designated in 1980. The site is owned by the Bureau of Land Management as part of the Morley Nelson Snake River Birds of Prey National Conservation Area.
