= Calder, Idaho =

Unincorporated community in the state of Idaho, United States

- Unincorporated community
- Location within Idaho Location within the United States
- Coordinates: 47°16′40″N 116°11′29″W
- Country: United States
- State: Idaho
- County: Shoshone
- Elevation: 2,185 ft (666 m)
- Time zone: UTC-8 (Pacific (PST))
  - Summer (DST): UTC-7 (PDT)
- ZIP code: 83808
- Area codes: 208, 986
- GNIS feature ID: 396209

Calder is an unincorporated community in Shoshone County, Idaho, United States. Calder is located on the Saint Joe River 18 miles (29 km) east of St. Maries. Calder has a post office with ZIP code 83808.

== History ==
Calder's population was 75 in 1909, and was also 75 in 1960.
