= Saint Maries River =

River in the United States of America

Coordinates: 47°18′58″N 116°33′20″W

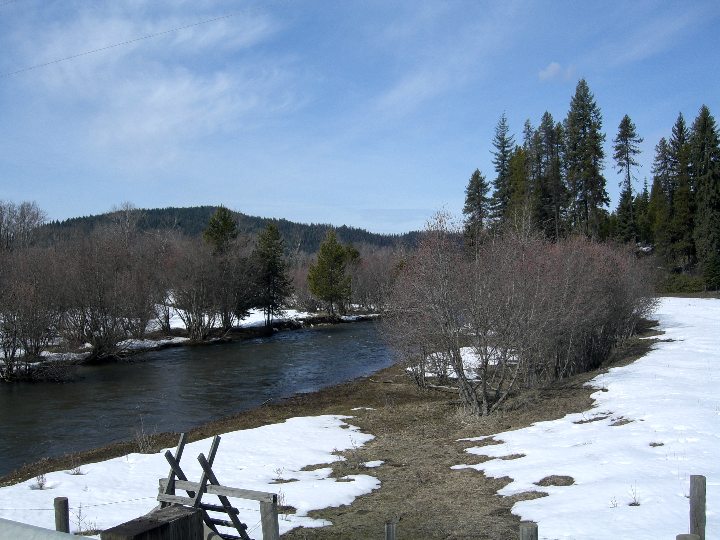
- Saint Maries River near Clarkia during spring runoff.

Location
- Country: United States
- State: Idaho
- Counties: Benewah County, Idaho, Shoshone County, Idaho

Physical characteristics
- Source: Coeur d'Alene Lake
- Mouth: St. Maries, Idaho
- Discharge
  - average: 583 cu ft/s (16.5 m^{3}/s)

The Saint Maries River is a tributary of Coeur d'Alene Lake in the U.S. state of Idaho. It is a tributary of Coeur d'Alene Lake and thus part of the Spokane River drainage basin and the Columbia River Basin. The west and middle forks of the river join near Clarkia, Idaho, and run parallel to State Highway 3 in a northwesterly direction to St. Maries, Idaho. The area is on the eastern edge of the Columbia River Plateau and is to the west of the Bitterroot Mountains. The river's discharge is estimated at 583 cubic feet per second at its mouth in the town of St. Maries.

Saint Maries River flows through Benewah County, Idaho and Shoshone County, Idaho.

== See also ==
- Tributaries of the Columbia River
