= Morley Nelson Snake River Birds of Prey National Conservation Area =

- IUCN category V (protected landscape/seascape)
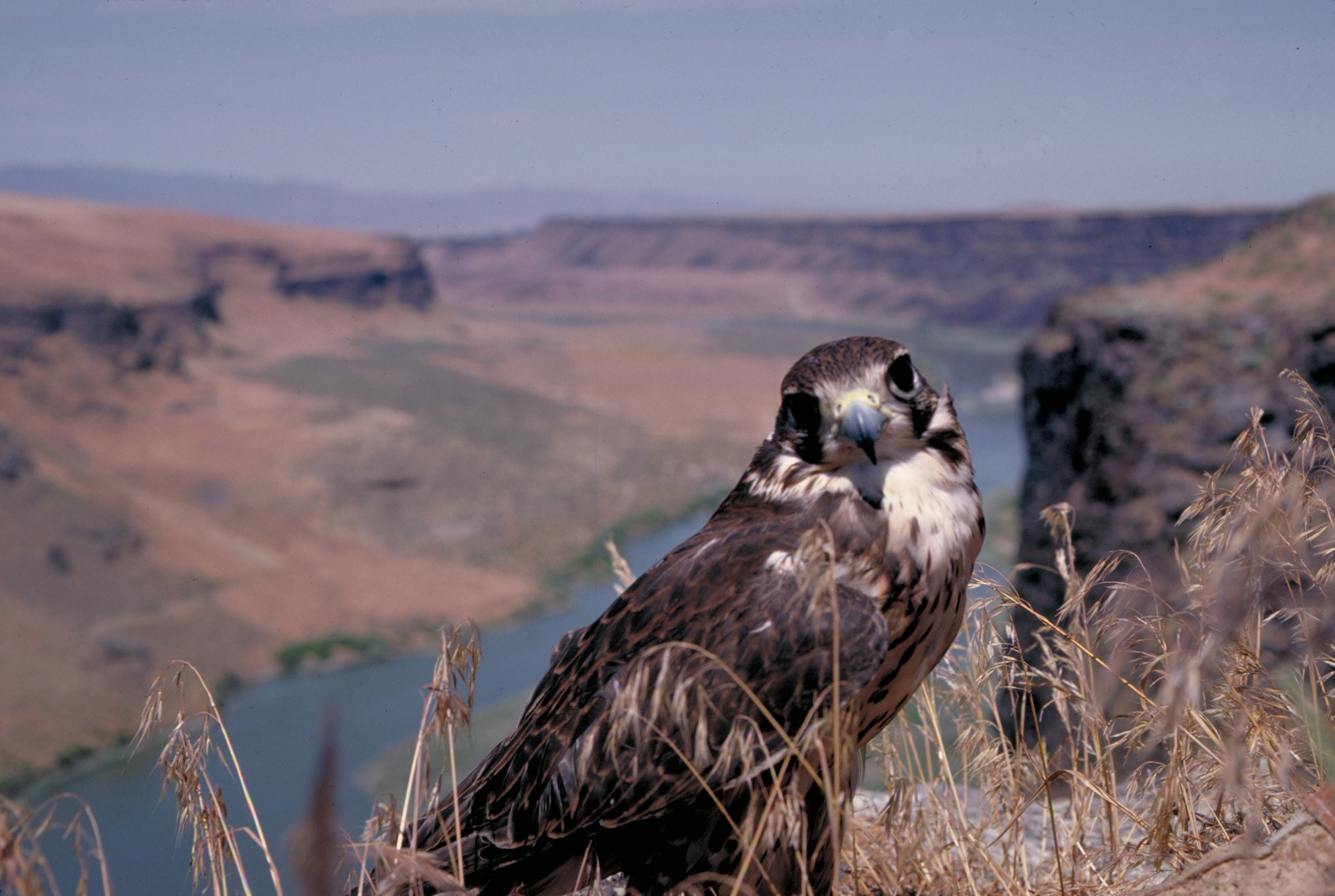
- Prairie falcon at the Snake River Birds of Prey National Conservation Area

- Location within the United States
- Location: Ada, Canyon, Elmore, and Owyhee counties, Idaho, United States
- Nearest city: Boise, Idaho
- Coordinates: 43°17′00″N 116°12′00″W
- Area: 484,873 acres (1,962.21 km^{2})
- Established: 1993
- Governing body: Bureau of Land Management
- Website: www.birdsofprey.blm.gov

The Morley Nelson Snake River Birds of Prey National Conservation Area has one of the densest populations of nesting raptors. The National Conservation Area (NCA) is located 35 miles (56 km) south of Boise, Idaho along 81 miles (130 km) of the Snake River, and is managed by the Bureau of Land Management. The NCA covers 484,873 acres (1,962.21 km^{2}). In descending order of land area it is located in Ada, Elmore, Owyhee, and Canyon counties.

Section 2301 of the Omnibus Public Lands Management Act of 2009, section 2301 renamed the area as the Morley Nelson Snake River Birds of Prey National Conservation Area in recognition of the contributions of Morley Nelson, a raptor expert and advocate and a leading proponent of the original creation of the National Conservation Area.

About 14,000 years ago, as glaciers receded from the last ice age, the 20,000-square-mile (52,000 km^{2}) Lake Bonneville crested at Red Rock Pass, Idaho, creating what is known as the Bonneville Flood. As soft soils eroded at the pass, the lake poured into the volcanic plain of the Snake River and its canyons. Today, visitors to the Snake River area can explore the house-size boulders, box canyons, and other evidence left behind by the tremendous flood. At Swan Falls (now Swan Falls Dam), peak discharge of the flood was an astounding 33 million cubic feet/second.

In the Snake River ecosystem, a unique combination of climate geology, soils, and vegetation supports extraordinary numbers of predators and prey. More than 700 pairs of raptors, representing 15 different species, nest on the high canyon walls. Nine additional raptor species use the Snake River area as seasonal hunting grounds during migrations or as wintering areas. Birds of Prey NCA is particularly important for prairie falcons, North America's only endemic falcon. The area is home to a significant portion of the species' known population.

Unusually high numbers of small burrowing mammals, which make their home on a plateau rich in vegetative cover and ideal soil, support a high density of raptors. Paiute ground squirrels, the main prey of the prairie falcon, are the most abundant of the burrowing creatures (in fact, according to the BLM, portions of the Birds of Prey NCA support the densest ground squirrel populations ever recorded). Nesting success for prairie falcons is linked very closely to the squirrel abundance. Similarly, the success of golden eagles and other raptors is tied to the great quantity of black-tailed jackrabbits. Additionally, abundant prey and deep soil support one of the densest populations of badgers in the world (up to 11 badgers per square mile).

Recurring wildfires and military training exercises at Snake River have altered the prey base for the raptor population that the NCA was established to protect. As a result, the raptor population is currently at risk. A Bureau of Land Management (BLM) study documents that nesting prairie falcons in the NCA have declined from a historical 230 pairs to an estimated 110 pairs today.

Crater Rings are adjacent, symmetrical volcanic pit craters and a National Natural Landmark located in the Nelson Snake River Birds of Prey National Conservation Area.

== History ==
In addition to its precious natural resources, Snake River Birds of Prey NCA has significant cultural value. Human occupation of the Snake River area has been dated to 10,000 BC. Shortly after the Bonneville Flood deposited large rounded boulders in the canyon, early inhabitants were using them as canvases for carving petroglyphs. Some of the oldest and most remarkable Native American Archeological sites in Idaho have been found within the NCA. The NCA also contains some of the best-preserved portions of the Oregon National Historic Trail and three sites from an 1860s gold mining settlement that are listed on the National Register of Historic Places.

Congress designated the Snake River Birds of Prey National Conservation Area on August 4, 1993, following two decades of research indicating the need to protect prey habitat and hunting territory as well as nesting habitat. The expressed purpose of the NCA, according to the United States Congress, is "to provide for the conservation, protection, and enhancement of raptor populations and habitats...". Currently, the BLM allows ranching, power generation and Army National Guard training to continue within the boundaries of the NCA.
