= Don Z. Zimmerman =

Aviator in the US Army and Air Force

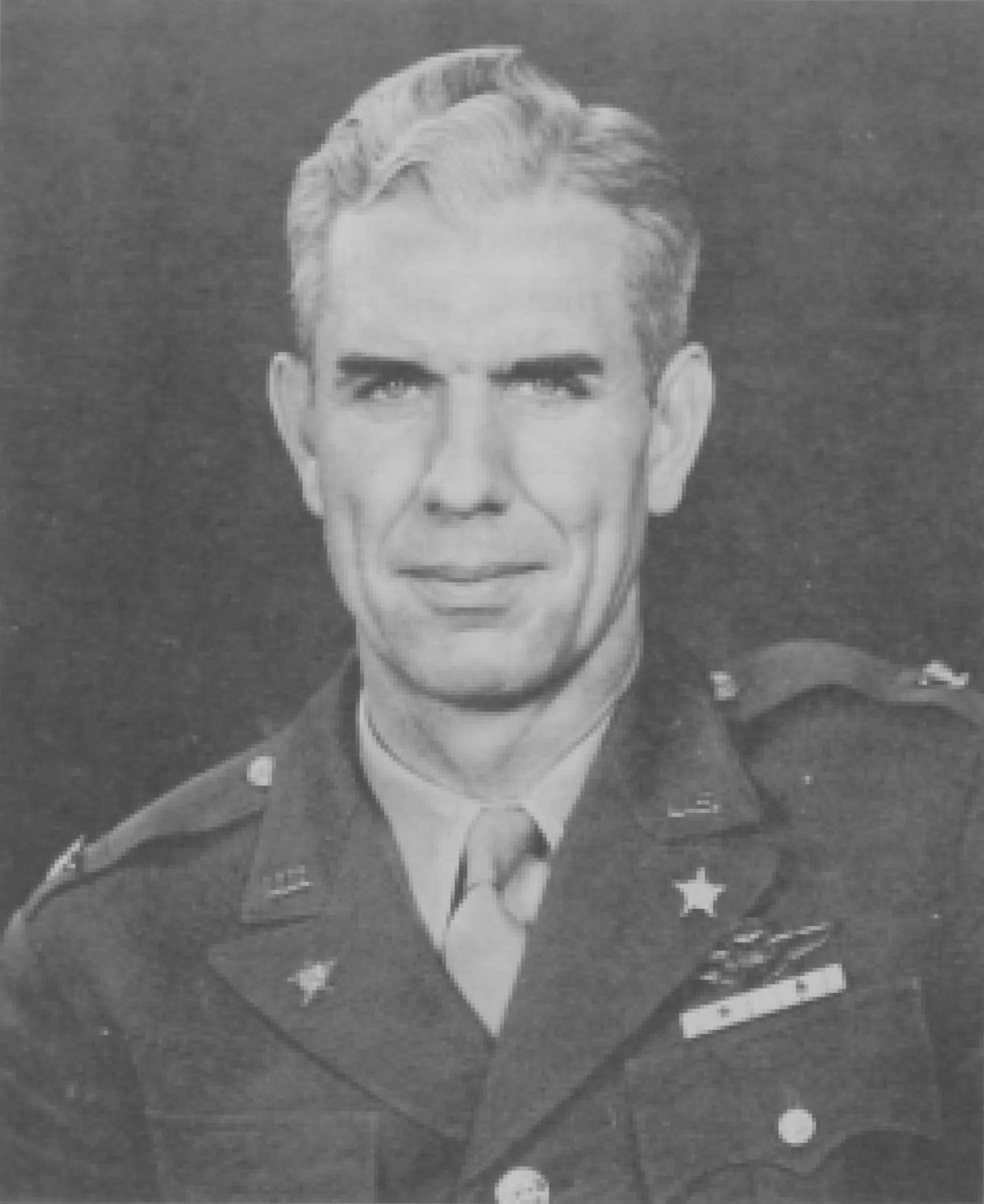
- Born: Don Zabriskie Zimmerman; 25 November 1903; Eugene, Oregon, U.S.
- Died: 11 May 1983 (aged 79); Mercer Island, Washington, U.S.
- Burial place: United States Air Force Academy Cemetery
- Military career
- Allegiance: United States
- Branch: United States Army Air Corps; United States Air Force
- Service years: 1929–1959
- Rank: Brigadier General
- Conflicts: World War II; Korean War
- Awards: Distinguished Service Medal; Legion of Merit (4)

Brigadier General Don Zabriskie Zimmerman (25 November 1903 – 11 May 1983) was an aviator in the United States Army and the United States Air Force during World War II and the Korean War. He was the first Dean of Faculty at the nascent United States Air Force Academy.

== Early life ==
Don Zabriskie Zimmerman was born in Eugene, Oregon, on 25 November 1903, the youngest of four children of John Wilbur Zimmerman, a comptroller at a lumber company, and his wife Zilpha Zula née Zabriskie, a teacher. He attended Eugene High School, and entered the University of Oregon when he was 15. During his first year he was a mathematics major, but switched to geology as a sophomore. He played baseball and was the left fielder and captain of the university team in his senior year. His ability attracted baseball talent scouts, and he received offers from two Major League Baseball and two Pacific Coast League teams, but turned down the offers.

After graduating with his bachelor of science after four years, Zimmerman pursued a master's degree in geology, and was a graduate assistant in geology at an annual salary of $500 in his fifth and sixth years at the university. He became a member of the Phi Kappa Psi fraternity, and was involved in the ROTC, commanding the ROTC regiment as a cadet colonel during his sixth year. This led to an offer of a Regular Army commission, but he turned it down too, accepting a reserve commission in the infantry. Instead, he sought to secure a graduate scholarship in petrography at an eastern university, but when this fell through, he decided to accept an offer of an appointment to the United States Military Academy at West Point, New York, from Senator Robert N. Stanfield.

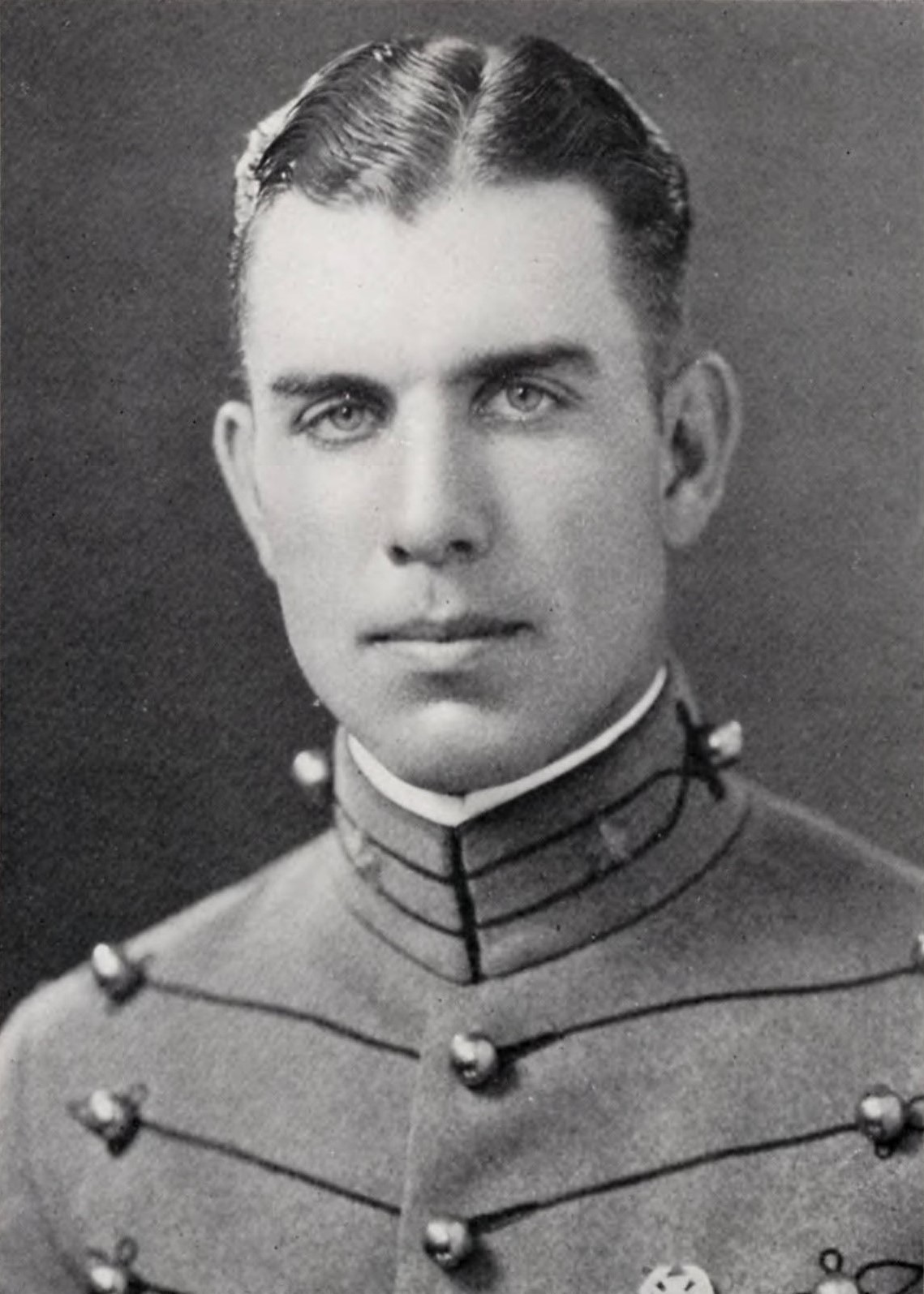
As a West Point cadet

Zimmerman entered West Point on 14 July 1925. He played basketball and baseball every year, and was captain of the baseball team in his final year. He was also a substitute fullback on the football team in his final two years. He was a member of the cadet choir, taught Sunday school, and qualified as an expert marksman with the rifle and pistol. He was a color corporal and a company commander, and was a "distinguished cadet", one with an average grade of 92 or more. He was class president in each of his last three years. The class yearbook described him as "the most popular man of his class". During his senior year, he visited Langley Field, Virginia, where he was impressed by the adjutant, Colonel James F. Doherty's, advocacy of an independent air force. He was also impressed by the colonel's daughter Marion.

== Early career ==
Ranked sixth in his class of 299, Zimmerman graduated from West Point on 13 June 1929, and was commissioned as a second lieutenant in the United States Army Corps of Engineers, as was normal for high-ranking graduates. However, he was detailed to the United States Army Air Corps on 12 September 1929, and two days later became a student at the Air Corps Primary Flying School at March Field, California. He then attended the Air Corps Advanced Flying School at Kelly Field, Texas, from which he graduated with his wings on 11 June 1930. He was formally transferred to the Air Corps on 11 December 1930, and was posted to Luke Field, Hawaii.

In July 1931, while practising dive bombing in a Thomas-Morse O-19, a biplane that was the first Air Corps aircraft with a metal fuselage, he failed to pull out in time, and the aircraft struck the ground. Observers saw it somersault three times before coming to a halt right-side up. The landing gear had sheared off and the engine was later found 440 yards (400 m) away. They expected to find Zimmerman in a similar condition, but he had suffered only a few cuts and bruises and a broken leg. The accident permanently deepened his voice, and soon after his hair began turning white.

Zimmerman married Marion Elizabeth Doherty in Manila on 15 July 1932. They had three children, two sons and a daughter. He returned to the United States on 26 February 1934, and was posted to Crissy Field, California, where he was promoted to first lieutenant on 1 October 1934, and became a student officer at the California Institute of Technology, once again pursuing a master's degree, but this time a Master of Arts in meteorology. His teachers included Sverre Petterssen, a Norwegian meteorologist whose theories of atmospheric circulation revolutionized weather forecasting. Zimmerman became an enthusiastic adherent. He obtained his master's degree under the supervision of Irving P. Krick, and became the post weather officer at Randolph Field, Texas. Considering the manuals on weather forecasting out of date, he and First Lieutenant Thomas S. Moorman wrote a new Weather Manual for Pilots based on Petterssen's teachings. He was promoted to captain on 13 June 1939. Zimmerman also graduated from the Air Corps Tactical School in 1939.

== World War II ==
On 1 July 1940, Zimmerman became a mathematics instructor at West Point. He returned to the California Institute of Technology on 1 February 1942 on a mission from the chief of the Army Air Forces, Lieutenant General Henry H. Arnold. A report had reached the War Department that the German invasion of Poland had been made possible by a weather forecast of unseasonably dry weather. Zimmerman was sent to discover if such accurate long-range weather forecasting was possible. He reported that it was not. He was promoted to major on 15 March 1941, lieutenant colonel on 1 February 1942, and colonel on 1 March 1942. He was the director of weather on the War Department General Staff from 8 February 1942 until 1 December 1942.

He then attended the shortened wartime course at the Army's Command and General Staff School at Fort Leavenworth, Kansas, from 1 December to 30 January 1943, after which he commanded the 21st Bombardment Group at MacDill Field, Florida, until 4 June 1943. He was in the first class of the Army–Navy Staff College that had been created by the Joint Chiefs of Staff in 1943, which he attended from 5 June to 14 October 1943.

Having completed this course, Zimmerman's next assignment was with the joint planning staff of the V Amphibious Corps in the Central Pacific. In this role he was involved in the planning for Operation Flintlock, the capture of the Marshall Islands. He was aware of Charles Darwin's general theory on the evolution of coral reefs and atolls, as expounded in The Structure and Distribution of Coral Reefs, from the 1840s, but believed that it was not an absolute predictor of the slope off lagoon shores in all cases. He built on Darwin's work with his own published paper on coral reef development, which divided atolls into 3 age strata, with different characteristics. The differences were crucial to the success of the operation, because the slopes off the lagoon shores of the Marshalls were steeper than forecast by a strict reading of Darwin's 19th century general work, and the lagoon was deep enough for LSTs to enter to discharge tanks directly onto the beach, which Zimmerman confirmed by going ashore with the 4th Marine Division. He was awarded the Legion of Merit for this service.

He returned to Washington, D.C., where he served with the Operations Division of the War Department General Staff from 5 June 1944 to 30 June 1945, returning to the Pacific to serve at the Guam-based headquarters of the United States Strategic Air Forces in the Pacific, for which he was awarded a second Legion of Merit.

== Later life ==
After the war, Zimmerman served in the Office of the Secretary of War until 28 March 1946. He was a student at the Imperial Defence College in the UK from 1 April 1946 to 20 December 1946, and then returned to Washington for another tour of duty on the War Department General Staff. With the creation of the United States Air Force as a separate service, he transferred to it as a colonel on 12 April 1948. After the outbreak of the Korean War he went to the Headquarters Far East Air Forces, first as its director of plans, programs and policy, and then as deputy for intelligence until after the fighting ended in 1953. He became a brigadier general, and was awarded two more Legions of Merit and the Air Force Distinguished Service Medal.

On 22 July 1954, Zimmerman became the first dean of faculty at the nascent United States Air Force Academy. As such, Zimmerman was responsible for the selection of teaching staff and development of the curriculum. He gave it a different orientation from West Point, with as many classroom hours devoted to the humanities and social studies as to scientific subjects. He then returned to the Pentagon as Air Force deputy director of Development Planning. In 1958 he became assistant for foreign developments to the deputy chief of staff of the Air Force for Development.

Zimmerman retired from the Air Force on 17 July 1959, and became a consultant for Boeing. He moved to Mercer Island, Washington and died there on 11 May 1983. Zimmerman was buried at the United States Air Force Academy Cemetery on 17 May 1983.
