= William S. Stone =

United States Air Force general (1910–1968)

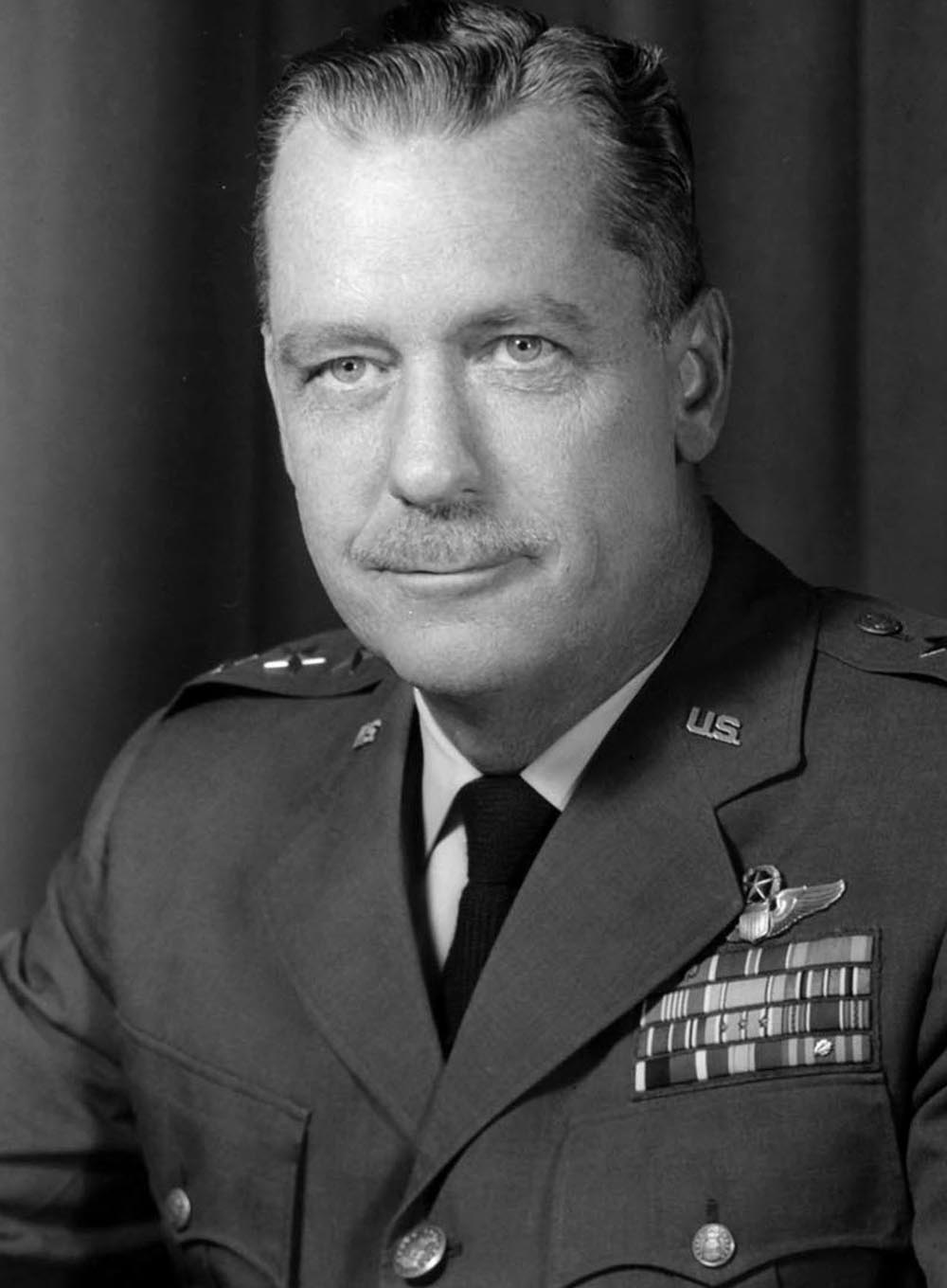
- Born: January 6, 1910; Cape Girardeau, Missouri, U.S.
- Died: December 2, 1968 (aged 58); Mons, Hainaut, Belgium
- Military career
- Allegiance: United States of America
- Branch: United States Air Force
- Service years: 1934–1968
- Rank: General
- Commands: Superintendent, U.S. Air Force Academy; Eastern Transport Air Force
- Conflicts: World War II
- Awards: Distinguished Service Medal (2); Legion of Merit (3); Bronze Star; Air Medal

General William Sebastian Stone (January 6, 1910 – December 2, 1968) was an American United States Air Force Major General and the third Superintendent of the United States Air Force Academy. His final assignment was as the air deputy to the Supreme Allied Commander Europe.

== Biography ==
On January 6, 1910, Stone was born at Cape Girardeau, Missouri. After graduating from high school in St. Louis, he attended the United States Military Academy, and, upon graduation on June 12, 1934, was commissioned a second lieutenant.

Upon completing flying training in October 1935, he was assigned to the 32nd Bomb Squadron at March Field, California. Two years later, in June 1937, he entered the California Institute of Technology. He received the degree of Master of Science in meteorology the following year and was assigned to Fort Lewis, Washington as the Weather Officer.

In May 1940, he was appointed to West Point as an instructor in economics, government and history. After two years at West Point, he was assigned to head the Air Corps Weather Research project at the California Institute of Technology. This assignment was followed by attendance at the Command and General Staff College, Fort Leavenworth, Kansas, and then duty as chief of staff and deputy commander of the Air Corps Weather Wing at Asheville, North Carolina. During this assignment he spent several months on temporary duty in the European, Far Eastern and Pacific theaters.

In the summer of 1944, General Stone was appointed director of Weather Services for the Army Air Force in the Pacific Ocean area and for the U.S. Strategic Air Forces in Guam during the bombing raids on Japan.

In 1946, he was appointed chief of staff of the Air Weather Service in Washington, D.C. The following year, he returned to West Point as associate professor in the Department of Social Sciences; and while in that assignment he earned a master's degree in economics from Columbia University. In August 1950, he entered the National War College. Upon graduation the following summer, he was assigned to Headquarters, U.S. Air Forces in Europe, initially as assistant chief of the Plans Division, then the following year as division chief.

After promotion to the grade of brigadier general, he was transferred to Headquarters, U.S. Air Force, in July 1953, as deputy director and then director of personnel planning. In September 1956, he was appointed assistant deputy chief of staff for personnel in the grade of major general. In June 1957, he was assigned to McGuire Air Force Base, New Jersey, as commander, Atlantic Division, Military Air Transport Service; and upon its reorganization, as commander, Eastern Transport Air Force.

In August 1959, he was assigned as superintendent at the United States Air Force Academy in Colorado, where he served for three years. He was then returned to the headquarters of the U.S. Air Force in Washington as deputy chief of staff personnel. Upon completion of this assignment in July 1966, Stone was assigned to Supreme Headquarters Allied Powers Europe in Paris as air deputy to the Supreme Allied Commander Europe. Stone died while on active duty on December 2, 1968, of a heart attack while exercising at a gym in Mons, Belgium. He was interred at the United States Air Force Academy Cemetery on December 6, 1968.

== Awards and decorations ==
Stone was a rated command pilot and technical observer. His decorations include the Air Force Distinguished Service Medal with oak leaf cluster, Legion of Merit with two oak leaf clusters, Bronze Star, Air Medal and the Army Commendation Ribbon

- Air Force Distinguished Service Medal with oak leaf cluster
- Legion of Merit with two oak leaf clusters
- Bronze Star
- Air Medal
- Army Commendation Ribbon

Preceded by James E. Briggs	Superintendent of the U.S. Air Force Academy; 1959—1962	Succeeded by Robert H. Warren
