= Robert H. Warren =

United States Air Force general

Robert Hamilton Warren
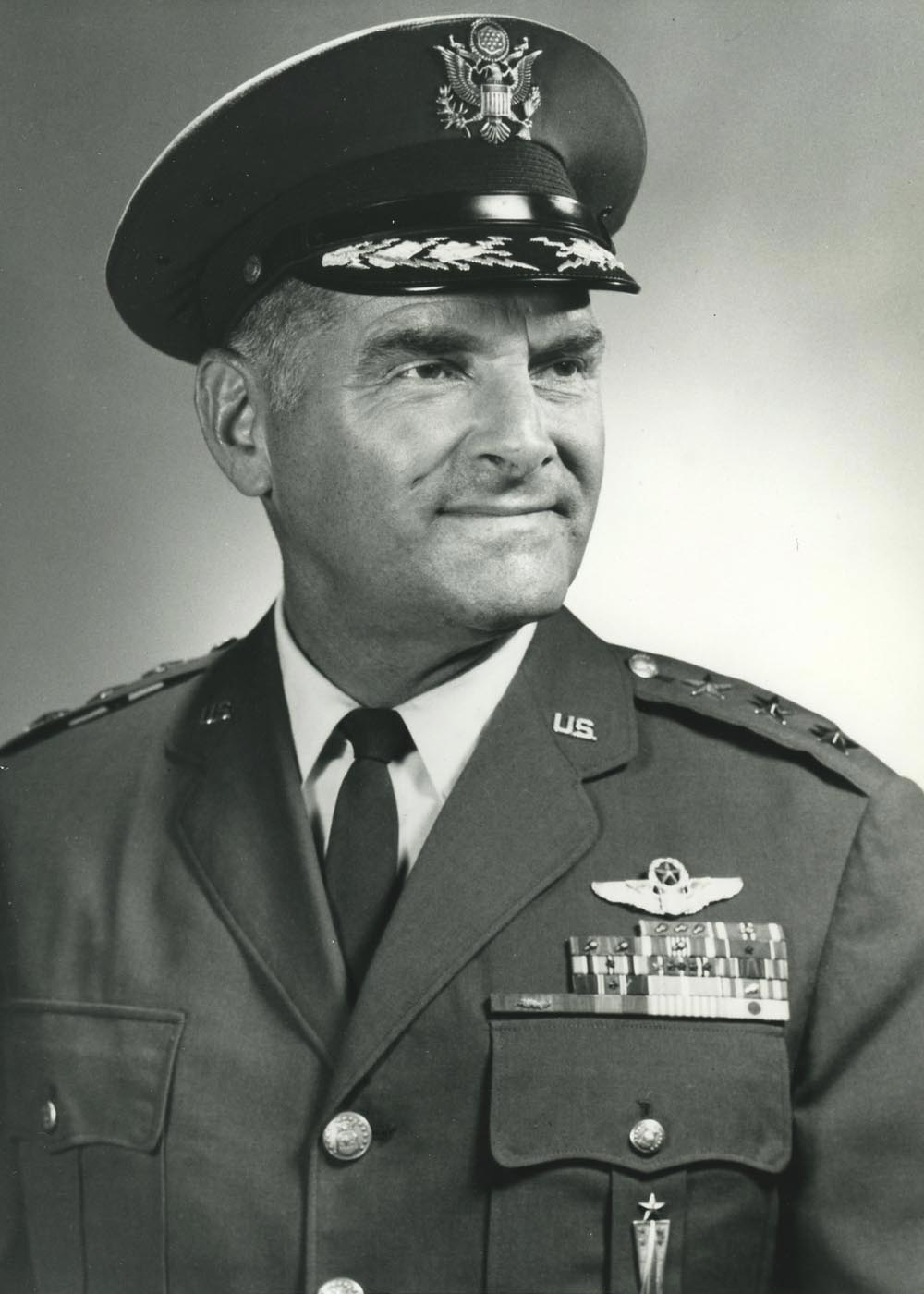
- Lieutenant General Robert Hamilton Warren
- Born: July 30, 1917; Yankton, South Dakota, U.S.
- Died: January 9, 2010 (aged 92); Charleston, West Virginia, U.S.
- Burial place: United States Air Force Academy Cemetery, Colorado
- Relatives: {daughter, Barbara Knight Warren
- Military career
- Allegiance: United States of America
- Branch: United States Air Force
- Service years: 1940–1971
- Rank: Lieutenant General
- Commands: Superintendent, U.S. Air Force Academy
- Conflicts: World War II; Korean War
- Awards: Distinguished Service Medal; Legion of Merit (4); Distinguished Flying Cross (2); Air Medal (3)

Lieutenant General Robert Hamilton Warren (July 30, 1917 – January 9, 2010) was a U.S. Air Force General and was the fourth Superintendent of the United States Air Force Academy.

== Biography ==
Warren was born in Yankton, South Dakota in 1917. He graduated from Yankton High School in 1934, attended Yankton College for two years, and then attended the United States Military Academy, graduating in 1940. In 1941 he graduated from flying school and received his pilot wings.

He next was assigned to the 29th Bombardment Group at MacDill Field, Florida as a B-18 Bolo pilot where he flew antisubmarine patrol duty from Newfoundland and Florida before and during the early days of World War II. In 1942 he moved to Boise, Idaho, with the 29th Group and participated in the B-17 crew and unit training program as a flight commander, squadron commander and then for a year as deputy commander of the 15th Bombardment Wing.

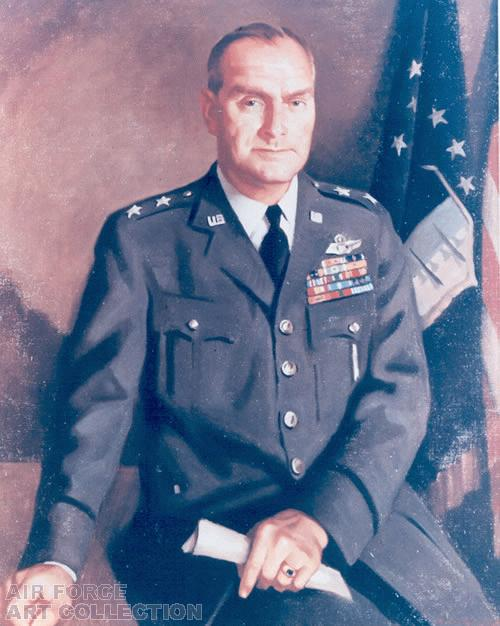
Portrait of Robert H. Warren

During 1944 and 1945 he flew combat with Fifteenth Air Force B-24 units in the European Theater of Operations as a squadron commander, 47th Wing operations officer, and as commander of the 376th Bombardment Group.

In 1945 he returned with the 376th Bombardment Group to Grand Island, Nebraska, where the group was reequipped and transitioned to B-29 aircraft.

General Warren was assigned to Headquarters Army Air Forces in Washington, D.C., in 1946. He went to the Air War College at Maxwell Air Force Base, Alabama in August 1949 and upon graduation in June 1950, was assigned to Headquarters, Far East Air Forces where he served as director of operations, then assistant deputy for operations during the three years of the Korean War.

He returned to the United States in 1953 and again was assigned to Headquarters U.S. Air Force in Washington, D.C., where he served as executive assistant to the secretary of the Air Force, and for two years as military assistant to the deputy secretary of Defense.

In July 1959 he went to the Air Proving Ground Center at Eglin Air Force Base, Florida, where he served as vice commander, then commander, except for a six-month period of duty in 1961 as senior member, Military Armistice Commission, United Nations Command, Korea.

He was named fourth superintendent of the U.S. Air Force Academy in July 1962 and served in this position until July 1965.

From August 1965 to April 1967, he served as chief of staff of the Air Force Systems Command at Andrews Air Force Base, Maryland. In April 1967 General Warren again returned to Headquarters U.S. Air Force and served as assistant deputy chief of staff, personnel.

In July 1968, General Warren became the director of military assistance in the Office of the Assistant Secretary of Defense (International Security Affairs). Subsequently, in March 1969 with the assumption of the additional responsibility for International Logistics Negotiations, he became the deputy assistant secretary of defense (international security affairs) for military assistance and sales.

In 1999, Warren moved to Charleston, West Virginia. He died at his home there on January 9, 2010. Warren was interred at the United States Air Force Academy Cemetery on January 15, 2010.

== Awards and decorations ==
His military decorations include the Distinguished Service Medal, the Legion of Merit with three oak leaf clusters, Distinguished Flying Cross with oak leaf cluster, Air Medal with two oak leaf clusters, Army Commendation Medal with oak leaf cluster and the French Croix de Guerre with Palm. He was a command pilot. Warren retired from the Air Force July 31, 1971.

- Air Force Distinguished Service Medal
- Legion of Merit with three oak leaf clusters
- Distinguished Flying Cross with oak leaf cluster
- Air Medal with two oak leaf clusters
- Army Commendation Medal with oak leaf cluster
- French Croix de Guerre with Palm

Preceded by William S. Stone	Superintendent of the U.S. Air Force Academy; 1962–1965	Succeeded by Thomas S. Moorman
