= Albert P. Clark =

United States Air Force general

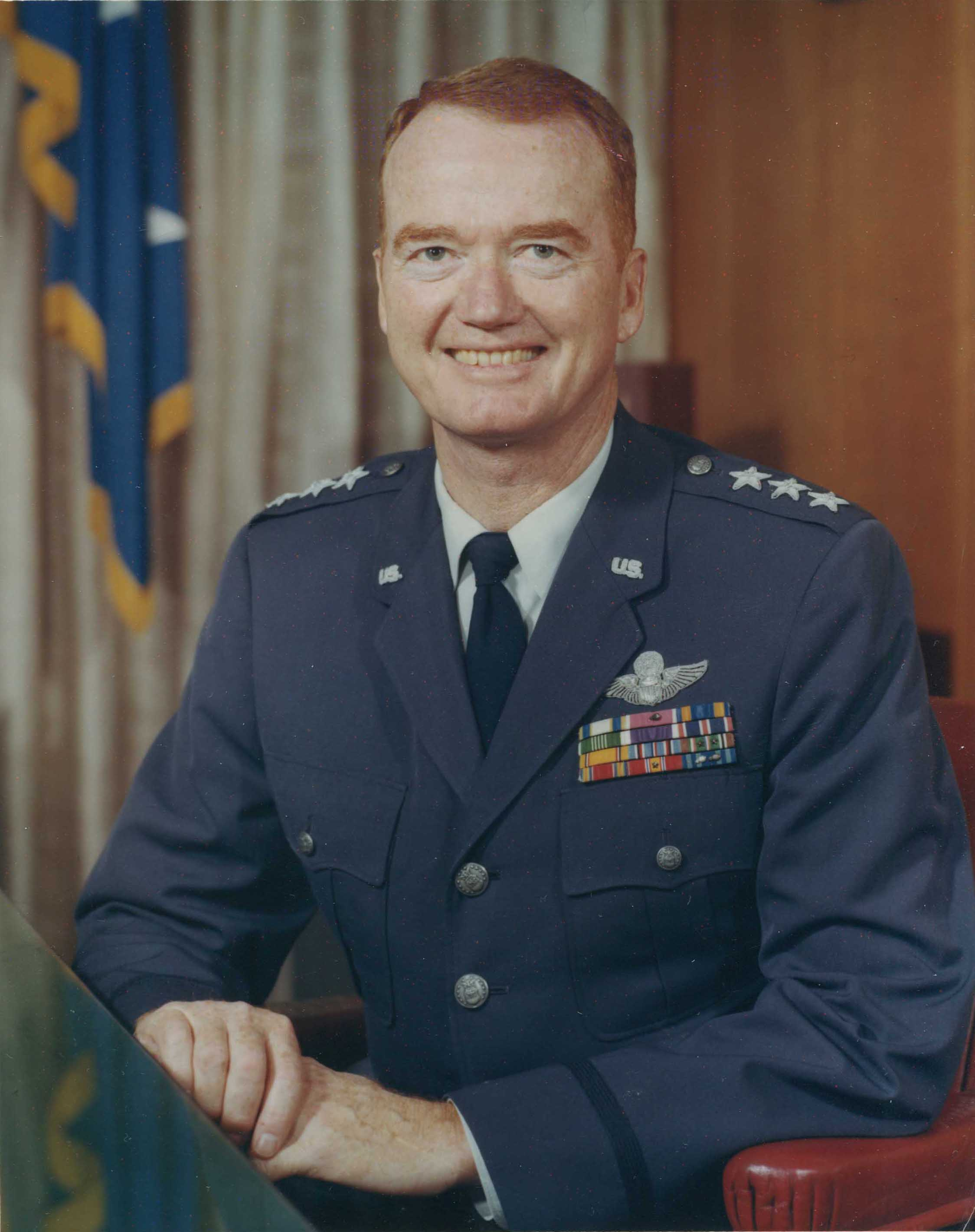
- Lieutenant General Albert P. Clark as Superintendent of the United States Air Force Academy
- Born: August 27, 1913; Schofield Barracks, Hawaii
- Died: March 8, 2010 (aged 96); Colorado Springs, Colorado, U.S.
- Burial place: USAF Academy Cemetery, Colorado
- Military career
- Allegiance: United States of America
- Branch: United States Air Force
- Service years: 1936–1974
- Rank: Lieutenant General
- Commands: Superintendent, U.S. Air Force Academy; Air University; 313th Air Division; 48th Fighter Bomber Wing
- Conflicts: World War II
- Awards: Distinguished Service Medal (3); Legion of Merit (2); Purple Heart; Air Medal

Lieutenant General Albert Patton Clark (August 27, 1913 – March 8, 2010) was the sixth superintendent of the United States Air Force Academy near Colorado Springs, Colorado.

== Biography ==
Clark was born at Schofield Barracks, Hawaii, in 1913. The son of an Army doctor, he graduated from Main Avenue High School in San Antonio, Texas. Appointed from the District of Columbia, Clark was a 1936 graduate of the United States Military Academy at West Point, New York and completed flying training at Randolph Field, Texas, in 1937.

He then served at Selfridge Field, Michigan and in June 1942, went to England as second in command of the 31st Fighter Group, the first American fighter unit in the European Theater of Operations. He was shot down over Abbeville, France, in July 1942 and was a prisoner of war at German prison camp Stalag Luft III until April 1945. He wrote about his experiences in Stalag Luft III in his book 33 Months as a POW in Stalag Luft III. He was a manager of accumulation and hiding of supplies used in the 1944 breakout in which 76 POWs escaped. That incident was documented in the 1950 Paul Brickhill book The Great Escape, and later was celebrated in the 1963 movie of the same title.

After World War II, he progressed through key staff assignments with Tactical Air Command, Continental Air Command and Air Defense Command prior to a tour of duty at Headquarters U.S. Air Force.

Clark commanded the 48th Fighter Bomber Wing at Chaumont Air Base in France, in 1955–1956, and then served as chief of staff of the U.S. Air Forces in Europe.

His next assignment was as Chief, U.S. Military Training Mission to Saudi Arabia.

He was director of military personnel at Headquarters U.S. Air Force for four years beginning in 1959 and was then assigned to Okinawa as commander of the 313th Air Division.

In August 1965, Clark was named vice commander of the Tactical Air Command. He was also promoted to lieutenant general in 1965. Clark assumed duties as commander of Air University in August 1968, and in August 1970, he was appointed superintendent of the U.S. Air Force Academy.

A command pilot, he was a graduate of the Armed Forces Staff College in 1947 and the National War College in 1952.

Clark died in Colorado Springs, Colorado on March 8, 2010, at age 96. He was interred at the United States Air Force Academy Cemetery on March 17, 2010.

== Awards and decorations ==
His military decorations and awards include the Air Force Distinguished Service Medal with two oak leaf clusters, Legion of Merit with oak leaf cluster, Purple Heart, Air Medal, Prisoner of War Medal, and the Air Force Commendation Medal. He retired from the Air Force on August 1, 1974.

- Air Force Distinguished Service Medal with two oak leaf clusters
- Legion of Merit with oak leaf cluster
- Purple Heart
- Air Medal
- Air Force Commendation Medal

== Publications ==
- Clark, Albert Patton (2005). 33 Months as a POW in Stalag Luft III: A World War II Airman Tells His Story. Golden, Colorado: Fulcrum. ISBN 978-1-55591-536-0.

== Notes ==
| Preceded by Thomas S. Moorman | Superintendent of the U.S. Air Force Academy; 1970–1974 | Succeeded by James R. Allen |
