= Michael P. C. Carns =

United States Air Force general (1937–2023)

Michael Carns
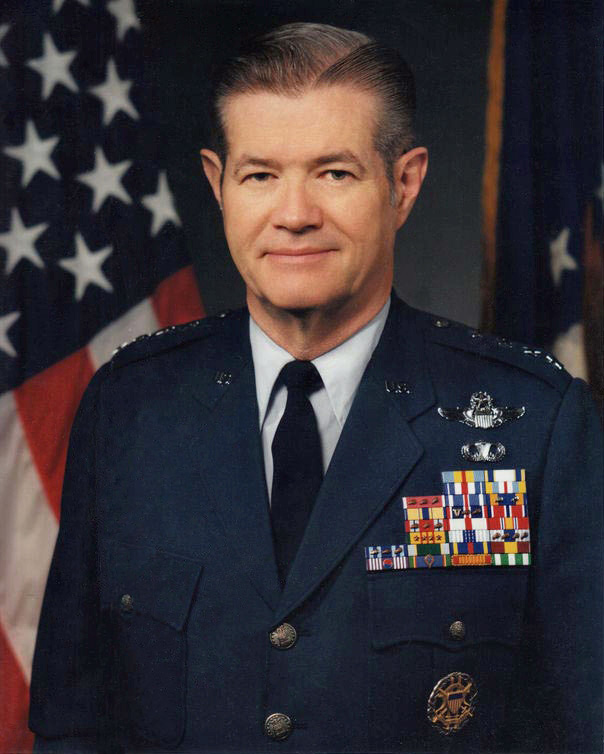
- Born: June 23, 1937; Junction City, Kansas, United States
- Died: October 11, 2023 (aged 86)
- Allegiance: United States
- Branch: United States Air Force
- Service years: 1959–1994
- Rank: General
- Awards: Defense Distinguished Service Medal (2); Air Force Distinguished Service Medal; Silver Star; Defense Superior Service Medal; Legion of Merit (4); Distinguished Flying Cross; Air Medal (11); Air Force Commendation Medal

Michael Patrick Chamberlain Carns (June 23, 1937 – October 11, 2023) was a four-star general in the United States Air Force (USAF). He served as the Vice Chief of Staff of the United States Air Force from 1991 to 1994.

== Early life ==
Carns was born in Junction City, Kansas. After graduating from St. John's College High School, Washington, D.C. in 1955, he went to the United States Air Force Academy and graduated with a Bachelor of Science degree in 1959.

After completing his B.S. degree, Carns completed primary pilot training in March 1960 at Graham Air Base in Florida and basic pilot training in September 1960 at Laredo Air Force Base in Texas.

== Career ==
Following pilot training, Carns served as a flight instructor at Laredo. In 1961, he was appointed Aide to the Commander, Air Reserve Records Center, Denver, Colorado, then Aide to the Commander, 4th Air Force Reserve Region, Randolph Air Force Base, Texas, followed by duty as Air Operations Officer at the same base.

Carns completed an MBA degree from Harvard Business School in 1967. After getting his MBA, he was assigned to the 476th Tactical Fighter Squadron, George Air Force Base, flying F-4 Phantom IIs. He transferred to the 40th Tactical Fighter Squadron, Eglin Air Force Base, again flying F-4s in January 1968. From August 1968 to September 1969 he was assigned to the 469th Tactical Fighter Squadron, Korat Royal Thai Air Force Base in Thailand, where he flew 200 combat missions in the F-4E during the Vietnam War.

Carns returned to the U.S. in September 1969 and he was assigned to USAF headquarters as a Plans and Programs Officer, and later, as Aide to the United States Air Force Chief of Staff. This was followed by tours at Torrejón Air Base in Spain, Supreme Headquarters Allied Powers Europe in Belgium and, RAF Bentwaters in England.

After completing the British Royal College of Defence Studies in 1977, Carns was assigned to the 81st Tactical Fighter Wing, RAF Bentwaters, as deputy commander for operations.

Carns returned to the U.S. again in March 1979 and took command of the 354th Tactical Fighter Wing, Myrtle Beach Air Force Base. He moved to Nellis Air Force Base in October 1980 as commander of the 57th Fighter Weapons Wing. In June 1982 he became director of operations, J-3, Rapid Deployment Joint Task Force, later redesignated United States Central Command, MacDill Air Force Base. He became deputy chief of staff for plans, Headquarters Pacific Air Forces, Hickam Air Force Base in July 1984, and deputy chief of staff for operations and intelligence in June 1985. In July 1986 he assumed command of 13th Air Force, Clark Air Base in the Philippines. In June 1987 he was assigned as deputy commander in chief and chief of staff, United States Pacific Command, Camp H.M. Smith in Hawaii. In September 1989 he became Director of the Joint Staff, Washington, DC. He became the Vice Chief of Staff of the United States Air Force in May 1991. On May 16, 1991, he was promoted to the rank of general.

== Life after retirement from U.S. Air Force ==
Carns retired from the United States Air Force in July 1994. In 1995, Carns was nominated to head the Central Intelligence Agency. At first Carns accepted but later withdrew. Carns said he was presented with allegations that he had violated U.S. immigration law in providing for a Filipino citizen, Elbino Runas, to come to the United States, and that the Carns family had failed to honor an employment contract with Runas. Runas lived with the Carns family in the Philippines and the family obtained immigration documents to bring him with them to Hawaii. He subsequently moved with the Carns family to Washington, D.C. and stayed with the family until 1992. Carns said he was presented with "groundless, outrageous, tabloid charges" made by Runas about members of Carns' family.

Carns later served as the managing director of a small healthcare firm for one year, followed by over four years as executive director of a New York-based policy research firm that specialized in Pacific Rim security in the areas of international capital flows and international energy demands. He was the vice chairman of PrivaSource, Inc., a small software firm specializing in the security and de-identification of large, sensitive databases, in Weston, Massachusetts. Carns also served on the board of directors for VirtualAgility, Inc. and M-International, Inc.

Carns died on October 11, 2023, at the age of 86. He will be interred at Arlington National Cemetery.

== Awards and decorations ==
Air Force Command Pilot Badge
Parachutist Badge
Joint Chiefs of Staff Badge

Defense Distinguished Service Medal with one bronze oak leaf cluster
Air Force Distinguished Service Medal
Silver Star
Defense Superior Service Medal
Legion of Merit with three oak leaf clusters
Distinguished Flying Cross
Air Medal with two silver oak leaf clusters
Air Force Commendation Medal
Air Force Outstanding Unit Award with Valor device and two oak leaf clusters
Air Force Organizational Excellence Award
Combat Readiness Medal with three oak leaf clusters
Air Force Recognition Ribbon
National Defense Service Medal with one bronze service star
Vietnam Service Medal with four service stars
Air Force Overseas Short Tour Service Ribbon
Air Force Overseas Long Tour Service Ribbon with four oak leaf clusters
Air Force Longevity Service Award with silver and two bronze oak leaf clusters
Small Arms Expert Marksmanship Ribbon
Air Force Training Ribbon
Outstanding Achievement Medal (Philippines)
Order of National Security Merit, Gukseon Medal
Order of the Crown of Thailand, Knight Grand Cross
Vietnam Gallantry Cross Unit Award
Vietnam Campaign Medal

== See also ==
- List of United States Air Force four-star generals

== Notes ==
Military offices
Preceded by Gene Deegan	Director of the Joint Staff; 1989–1991	Succeeded by Henry Viccellio
Preceded by John Loh	Vice Chief of Staff of the Air Force; 1991–1994	Succeeded by Thomas Moorman
