= Richard Yudkin =

United States Air Force officer

Richard A. Yudkin
- Born: 15 March 1919; Derby, Connecticut
- Died: 13 December 2004 (aged 85); Ottawa Hills, Ohio
- Burial place: United States Air Force Academy Cemetery
- Military career
- Allegiance: United States of America
- Branch: United States Air Force
- Service years: 1940–1970
- Rank: Major General
- Conflicts: World War II; Cold War
- Awards: Legion of Merit; Army Commendation Ribbon with oak leaf cluster; Medaille de l'Aeronautique

Major General Richard Allen Yudkin (15 March 1919 – 13 December 2004) was a United States Air Force (USAF) officer.

== Early life and education ==
Yudkin was born on 15 March 1919 in Derby, Connecticut. He attended New York University, where he participated in the Army ROTC program. Yudkin graduated with a B.A. degree in June 1940.

== Military career ==
Upon graduation from college, Yudkin was commissioned as a reserve officer in the infantry. His acceptance of a scholarship for graduate study was deferred to permit him to enter active duty with the U.S. Army Air Corps as a Second lieutenant in August 1940. He was assigned originally to the Ninth Bomb Group at Mitchel Field, New York, and accompanied that unit to Panama when it was relocated there in late 1940.

Yudkin was promoted to first lieutenant in February 1942, captain in July 1942, major in May 1943 and lieutenant colonel in April 1947.

Yudkin served almost five years as a plans officer on the Supreme Headquarters Allied Powers Europe staff, starting his service there during the early establishment of the headquarters in 1951. In 1960, Yudkin was assigned to Headquarters Pacific Air Forces where he served as assistant chief of staff, plans. In 1963, he was reassigned to Headquarters USAF as deputy director of plans for policy. He was promoted to the grade of Brigadier general (temporary) in June 1963.

In 1965, he was assigned as director of doctrine, concepts and objectives, Deputy Chief of Staff/Plans and Operations, Headquarters USAF.

Yudkin served for more than three years as USAF member - and for portions of that period as chairman - of the U.S. delegations to the Inter-American Defense Board, the Joint Brazil-U.S. Defense Commission and the Joint Mexico-U.S. Defense Commission.

In 1965, Yudkin was elected to membership in the Council on Foreign Relations. His assignments in the U.S. included tours with the Air University, Continental Air Command and Air Defense Command. He was a graduate of the Army's Command and General Staff School in 1944 and the Air Command and Staff College.

He was promoted to Brigadier general (permanent) in February 1966, and to Major general (temporary) in July 1967.

In his role as director of doctrine, concepts and objectives, Yudkin was responsible for establishing the longer range objectives of the USAF and for defining concepts and developing doctrine relevant to achievement of those objectives. His office maintained close relationship with research and development activities and it sponsored specific programs designed to encourage communication and inter-action with appropriate political, academic and industrial communities.

In the face of opposition from senior USAF leadership USAF Chief of Staff General John P. McConnell placed the A-X program for a dedicated ground attack and close air support (CAS) aircraft in Yudkin's unit. Yudkin's subordinate Colonel Avery Kay convinced him that the USAF had never adequately supported the CAS mission in support of the ground forces and their advocacy of the program eventually led to the adoption of the Fairchild Republic A-10 Thunderbolt II.

Yudkin worked with James R. Schlesinger at the RAND Corporation to develop the nuclear options (NU-OPTS) project to explore concepts for limited nuclear war. In late 1969, Yudkin gave NU-OPTS presentations at the Pentagon and Los Alamos National Laboratory where he stated that "limited nuclear warfare is a possibility inherent in the logic of the nuclear environment."

Brent Scowcroft acknowledged Yudkin's role as his mentor, saying "he actually told me how to get things done, how to think." and credited Yudkin for bringing him to the attention of senior USAF leadership.

Yudkin was described as "a most peculiar Air Force officer – short, rotund, Jewish, bookish, a bachelor with no hobbies or interests outside the Air Force, a man who had never been a pilot or a navigator, who had climbed to the rank of major general and director of Air Force policy on his brainpower."

He retired from the USAF in 1970.

== Later life ==
Following his retirement he worked for Owens-Corning Fiberglass Corporation, having been recruited by Lauris Norstad to be director of public affairs. He also served on the Toledo City Council. On his death he bequeathed over $4m of his estate to Toledo institutions.

In 1984, Yudkin left Owen-Corning as a senior vice president but continued to live in Ottawa Hills, Ohio. In 1991, President George H. W. Bush appointed him to the board of visitors of the United States Air Force Academy. Yudkin died on 13 December 2004 at his home in Ottawa Hills. He was interred at the United States Air Force Academy Cemetery on 21 January 2005.

== Decorations ==
His military decorations and awards include the Legion of Merit and the Army Commendation Ribbon with oak leaf cluster. He was decorated by France with the Medaille de l'Aeronautique.
