= The Structure and Distribution of Coral Reefs =

1842 book by Charles Darwin

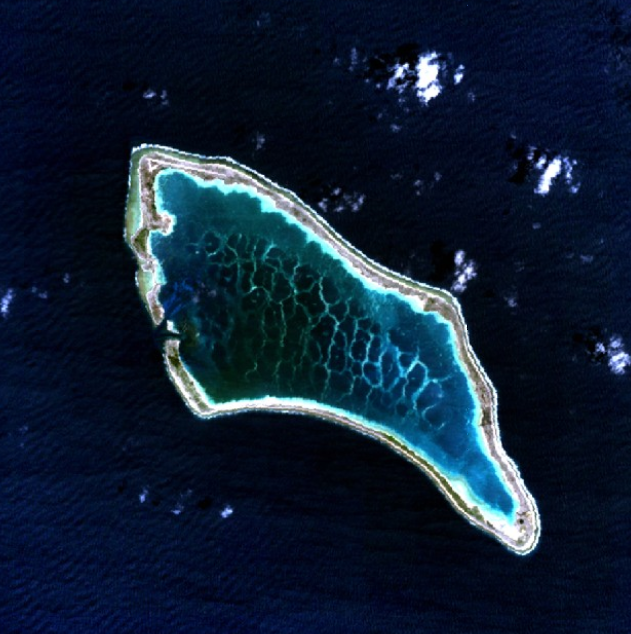
Canton Island typifies the isolated coral atolls dotting the Pacific Ocean.

The Structure and Distribution of Coral Reefs, Being the first part of the geology of the voyage of the Beagle, under the command of Capt. Fitzroy, R.N. during the years 1832 to 1836, was published in 1842 as Charles Darwin's first monograph, and set out his theory of the formation of coral reefs and atolls. He conceived of the idea during the voyage of the Beagle while still in South America, before he had seen a coral island, and wrote it out as HMS Beagle crossed the Pacific Ocean, completing his draft by November 1835. At the time there was great scientific interest in the way that coral reefs formed, and Captain Robert FitzRoy's orders from the Admiralty included the investigation of an atoll as an important scientific aim of the voyage. FitzRoy chose to survey the Keeling Islands in the Indian Ocean. The results supported Darwin's theory that the various types of coral reefs and atolls could be explained by uplift and subsidence of vast areas of the Earth's crust under the oceans.

The book was the first volume of three Darwin wrote about the geology he had investigated during the voyage, and was widely recognised as a major scientific work that presented his deductions from all the available observations on this large subject. In 1853, Darwin was awarded the Royal Society's Royal Medal for the monograph and for his work on barnacles. Darwin's theory that coral reefs formed as the islands and surrounding areas of crust subsided has been supported by modern investigations, and is no longer disputed, while the cause of the subsidence and uplift of areas of crust has continued to be a subject of discussion.

== Theory of coral atoll formation ==
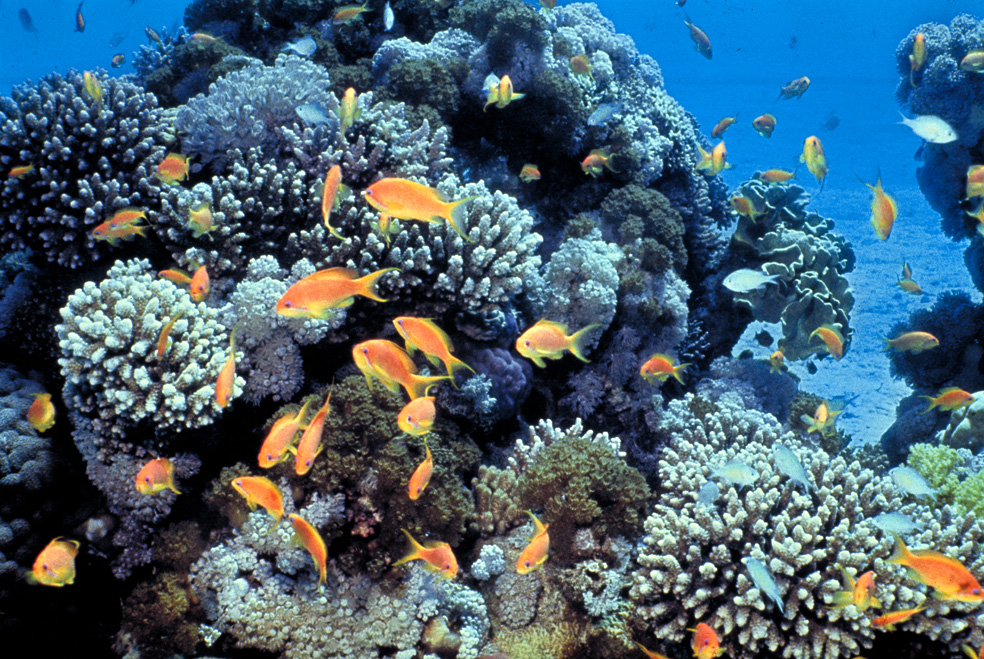
Reefs were formed by corals living in shallow depths of water.

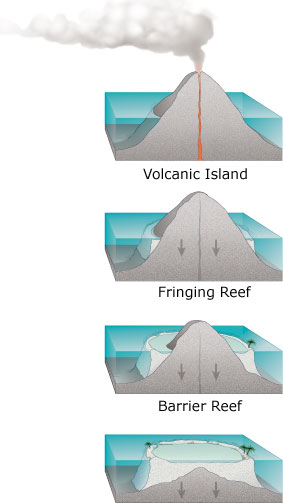
Darwin's theory set out a sequence of coral reef formation around an extinct volcanic island, becoming an atoll as the island and ocean floor subsided. Courtesy of the US Geological Survey.

When the Beagle set out in 1831, the formation of coral atolls was a scientific puzzle. Advance notice of her sailing, given in the Athenaeum of 24 December, described investigation of this topic as "the most interesting part of the Beagle's survey" with the prospect of "many points for investigation of a scientific nature beyond the mere occupation of the surveyor. In 1824 and 1825, French naturalists Quoy and Gaimard had observed that the coral organisms lived at relatively shallow depths, but the islands appeared in deep oceans. In books that were taken on the Beagle as references, Henry De la Beche, Frederick William Beechey and Charles Lyell had published the opinion that the coral had grown on underwater mountains or volcanoes, with atolls taking the shape of underlying volcanic craters. The Admiralty instructions for the voyage stated:

The circularly-formed Coral Islands in the Pacific occasionally afford excellent land-locked harbours, with a sufficient entrance, and would be well adapted to any nice astronomical observations which might require to be carried on in undisturbed tranquillity. While these are quietly proceeding, and the chronometers rating, a very interesting inquiry might be instituted respecting the formation of these coral reefs .... A modern and very plausible theory has been put forward, that these wonderful formations, instead of ascending from the bottom of the sea, have been raised from the summits of extinct volcanoes ...

As a student at the University of Edinburgh in 1827, Darwin learnt about marine invertebrates while assisting the investigations of the anatomist Robert Edmond Grant, and during his last year at the University of Cambridge in 1831, he had studied geology under Adam Sedgwick. So when he was unexpectedly offered a place on the Beagle expedition, as a gentleman naturalist he was well suited to FitzRoy's aim of having a companion able to examine geology on land while the ship's complement carried out its hydrographic survey. FitzRoy gave Darwin the first volume of Lyell's Principles of Geology before they left. On their first stop ashore at St Jago island in January 1832, Darwin saw geological formations which he explained using Lyell's uniformitarian concept that forces still in operation made land slowly rise or fall over immense periods of time, and thought that he could write his own book on geology. Lyell's first volume included a brief outline of the idea that atolls were based on volcanic craters, and the second volume, which was sent to Darwin during the voyage, gave more detail. Darwin received it in November 1832.

While the Beagle surveyed the coasts of South America from February 1832 to September 1835, Darwin made several trips inland and found extensive evidence that the continent was gradually rising. After witnessing an erupting volcano from the ship, he experienced the 1835 Concepción earthquake. In the following months he speculated that as the land was uplifted, large areas of the ocean bed subsided. It struck him that this could explain the formation of atolls.

Darwin's theory followed from his understanding that coral polyps thrive in the clean seas of the tropics where the water is agitated, but can only live within a limited depth of water, starting just below low tide. Where the level of the underlying land stays the same, the corals grow around the coast to form what he called fringing reefs, and can eventually grow out from the shore to become a barrier reef. Where the land is rising, fringing reefs can grow around the coast, but coral raised above sea level dies and becomes white limestone. If the land subsides slowly, the fringing reefs keep pace by growing upwards on a base of dead coral, and form a barrier reef enclosing a lagoon between the reef and the land. A barrier reef can encircle an island, and once the island sinks below sea level a roughly circular atoll of growing coral continues to keep up with the sea level, forming a central lagoon. Should the land subside too quickly or sea level rise too fast, the coral dies as it is below its habitable depth.

== Darwin's investigations to test his theory ==
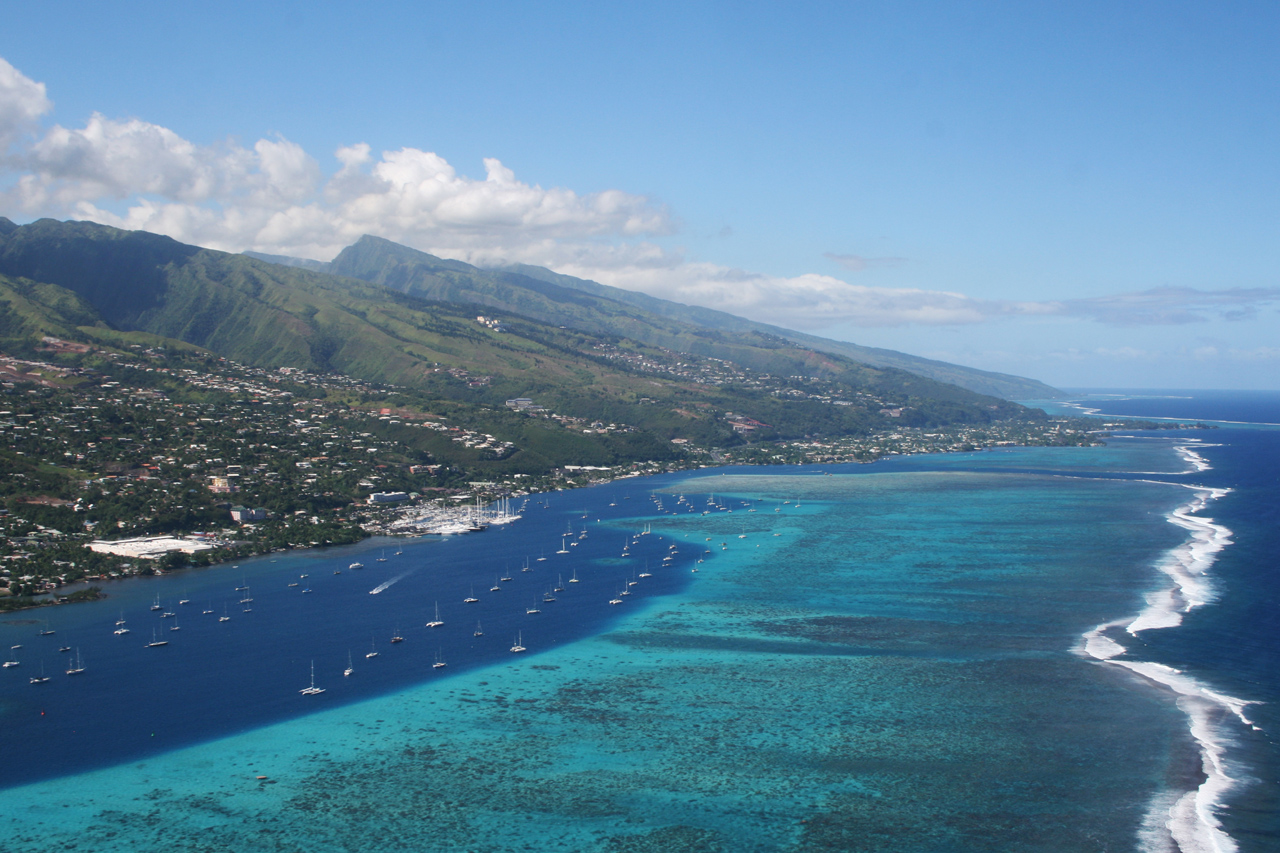
Darwin saw the coral reef and lagoon around Tahiti.

By the time that the Beagle set out for the Galápagos Islands on 7 September 1835, Darwin had thought out the essentials of his theory of atoll formation. While he no longer favoured the concept that atolls formed on submerged volcanos, he noted some points on these islands which supported that idea: 16 volcanic craters resembled atolls in being raised slightly more on one side, and five hills appeared roughly equal in height. He then considered a topic which was compatible with either theory, the lack of coral reefs around the Galápagos Islands. One possibility was a lack of calcareous matter around the islands, but his main proposal, which FitzRoy had suggested to him, was that the seas were too cold. As they sailed on, Darwin took note of the records of sea temperature kept in the ship's "Weather Journal".

He had his first glimpse of coral atolls as they passed Honden Island on 9 November and sailed on through the Low or Dangerous Archipelago (Tuamotus). Arriving at Tahiti on 15 November, Darwin saw it "encircled by a Coral reef separated from the shore by channels & basins of still water". He climbed the hills of Tahiti, and was strongly impressed by the sight across to the island of Eimeo, where "The mountains abruptly rise out of a glassy lake, which is separated on all sides, by a narrow defined line of breakers, from the open sea. – Remove the central group of mountains, & there remains a Lagoon Isd." Rather than recording his findings about the coral reefs in his notes about the island, he wrote them up as the first full draft of his theory, an essay titled Coral Islands, dated 1835. They left Tahiti on 3 December, and Darwin probably wrote his essay as they sailed towards New Zealand where they arrived on 21 December. He described the polyp species building the coral on the barrier wall, flourishing in the heavy surf of breaking waves particularly on the windward side, and speculated on reasons that corals in the calm lagoon did not grow so high. He concluded with a "remark that the general horizontal uplifting which I have proved has & is now raising upwards the greater part of S. America & as it would appear likewise of N. America, would of necessity be compensated by an equal subsidence in some other part of the world."

=== Keeling Islands ===
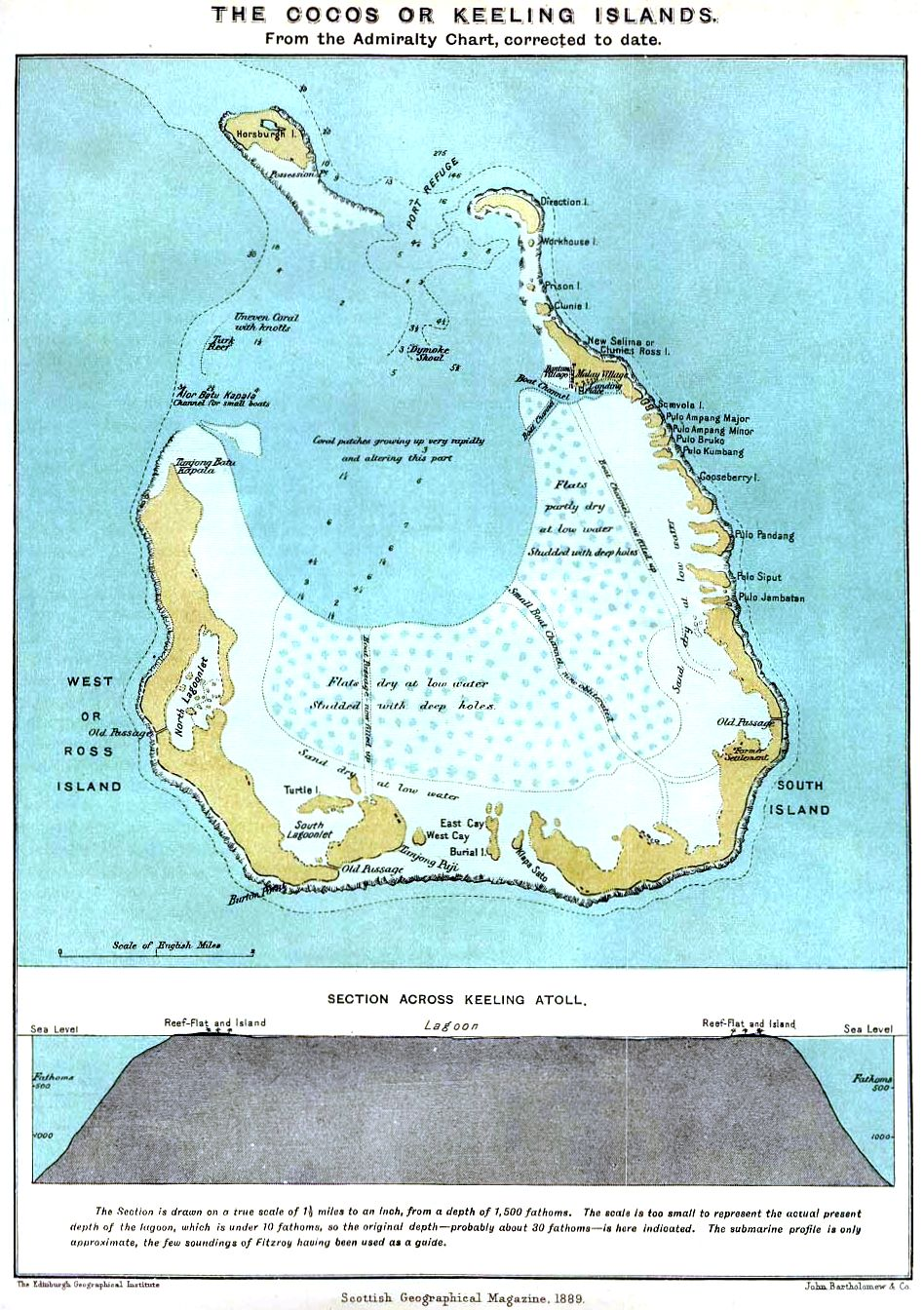
An 1889 map of the Keeling Islands based on the Admiralty Chart includes a section across the atoll showing the steep slopes FitzRoy's soundings found outside the reef.

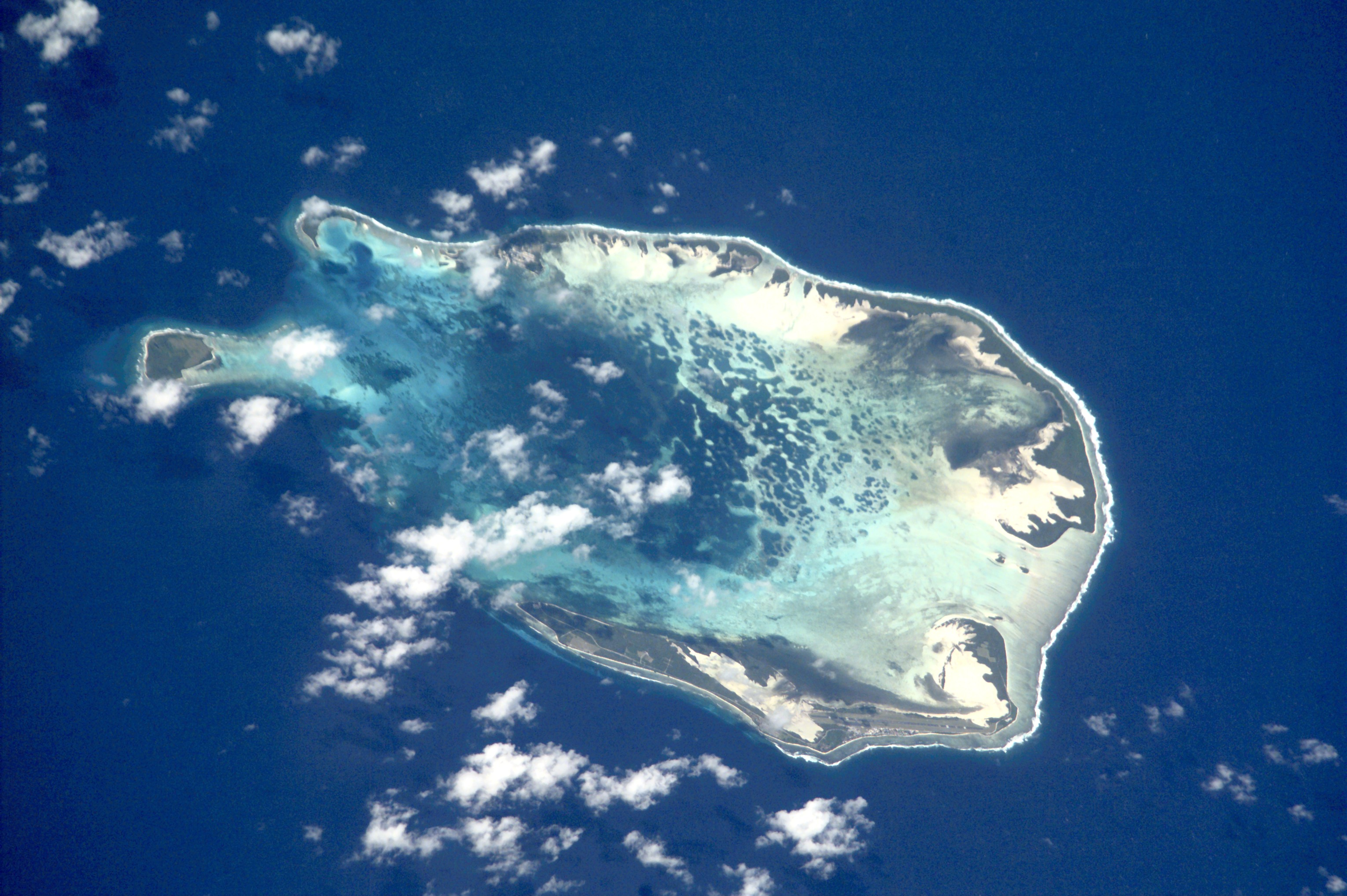
Keeling Islands seen from the International Space Station

FitzRoy's instructions set detailed requirements for geological survey of a circular coral atoll to investigate how coral reefs formed, particularly if they rose from the bottom of the sea or from the summits of extinct volcanoes, and to assess the effects of tides by measurement with specially constructed gauges. FitzRoy chose the Keeling Islands in the Indian Ocean, and on arrival there on 1 April 1836, the entire crew set to work, first erecting FitzRoy's new design of a tide gauge that allowed readings to be taken from the shore. Boats were sent all around the island to carry out the survey, and despite being impeded by strong winds, they took numerous soundings to establish depths around the atoll and in the lagoon. FitzRoy noted the smooth and solid rock-like outer wall of the atoll, with most life thriving where the surf was most violent. He had great difficulty in establishing the depth reached by living coral, as pieces were hard to break off and the small anchors, hooks, grappling irons, and chains they used were all snapped off by the swell as soon as they tried to pull them up. He had more success using a sounding line with a bell-shaped lead weight armed with tallow hardened with lime; this would be indented by any shape that it struck to give an exact impression of the bottom; it would also collect any fragments of coral or grains of sand.

These soundings were taken personally by FitzRoy, and the tallow from each sounding was cut off and taken on board to be examined by Darwin. The impressions taken on the steep outside slope of the reef were marked with the shapes of living corals, and otherwise were clean down to about 10 fathoms (18 m); then at increasing depths, the tallow showed fewer such impressions and collected more grains of sand until it was evident that there were no living corals below about 20–30 fathoms (36–55 m). Darwin carefully noted the location of the different types of coral around the reef and in the lagoon. In his diary, he described, "examining the very interesting yet simple structure & origin of these islands. The water being unusually smooth, I waded in as far as the living mounds of coral on which the swell of the open sea breaks. In some of the gullies & hollows, there were beautiful green & other colored fishes, & the forms & tints of many of the Zoophites were admirable. It is excusable to grow enthusiastic over the infinite numbers of organic beings with which the sea of the tropics, so prodigal of life, teems", though he cautioned against the "rather exuberant language" used by some naturalists.

As they left the islands after eleven days, Darwin wrote out a summary of his theory in his diary:

Throughout the whole group of Islands, every single atom, even from the most minute particle to large fragments of rocks, bear the stamp of once having been subjected to the power of organic arrangement. Capt. FitzRoy at the distance of but little more than a mile from the shore sounded with a line 7200 feet long, & found no bottom. Hence we must consider this Isld as the summit of a lofty mountain; to how great a depth or thickness the work of the Coral animal extends is quite uncertain.... Under this view, we must look at a Lagoon Isd as a monument raised by myriads of tiny architects, to mark the spot where a former land lies buried in the depths of the ocean.

== Publication of theory ==
When the Beagle returned on 2 October 1836, Darwin was already a celebrity in scientific circles, as in December 1835 University of Cambridge Professor of Botany John Stevens Henslow had fostered his former pupil's reputation by giving selected naturalists a pamphlet of Darwin's geological letters. Charles Lyell eagerly met Darwin for the first time on 29 October, enthusiastic about the support this gave to his uniformitarianism, and in May wrote to John Herschel that he was "very full of Darwin's new theory of Coral Islands, and have urged Whewell to make him read it at our next meeting. I must give up my volcanic crater theory for ever, though it cost me a pang at first, for it accounted for so much... the whole theory is knocked on the head, and the annular shape and central lagoon have nothing to do with volcanoes, nor even with a crateriform bottom.... Coral islands are the last efforts of drowning continents to lift their heads above water. Regions of elevation and subsidence in the ocean may be traced by the state of the coral reefs." Darwin presented his findings and theory in a paper which he read to the Geological Society of London on 31 May 1837.

Darwin's first literary project was his Journal and Remarks on the natural history of the expedition, now known as The Voyage of the Beagle. In it he expanded his diary notes into a section on this theory, emphasising how the presence or absence of coral reefs and atolls can show whether the ocean bed is elevating or subsiding. At the same time he was privately speculating intensively about transmutation of species, and taking on other projects. He finished writing out his journal around the end of September, but then had the work of correcting proofs.

His tasks included finding experts to examine and report on his collections from the voyage. Darwin proposed to edit these reports, writing his own forewords and notes, and used his contacts to lobby for government sponsorship of publication of these findings as a large book. When a Treasury grant of £1,000 was allocated at the end of August 1837, Darwin stretched the project to include the geology book that he had conceived in April 1832 at the first landfall in the voyage. He selected Smith, Elder & Co. as the publisher, and gave them unrealistic commitments on the timing of providing the text and illustrations. He assured the Treasury that the work would be good value, as the publisher would only require a small commission profit, and he himself would have no profit. From October he planned what became the multi-volume Zoology of the Voyage of H.M.S. Beagle on his collections, and began writing about the geology of volcanic islands.

In January 1838, Smith, Elder & Co. advertised the first part of Darwin's geology book, Geological observations on volcanic islands and coral formations, as a single octavo volume to be published that year. By the end of the month Darwin thought that his geology was "covering so much paper, & will take so much time" that it could be split into separate volumes (eventually Coral reefs was published first, followed by Volcanic islands in 1844, and South America in 1846). He also doubted that the treasury funds could cover all the geological writings. The first part of the zoology was published in February 1838, but Darwin found it a struggle to get the experts to produce their reports on his collections, and overwork led to illness. After a break to visit Scotland, he wrote up a major paper on the geological "roads" of Glen Roy. On 5 October 1838 he noted in his diary, "Began Coral Paper: requires much reading".

In November 1838 Darwin proposed to his cousin Emma, and they married in January 1839. As well as his other projects he continued to work on his ideas of evolution as his "prime hobby", but repeated delays were caused by his illness. He sporadically restarted work on Coral Reefs, and on 9 May 1842 wrote to Emma, telling her he was:

gloomy & tired— the government money has gone much quicker than I thought & the expences of the coral-volume are greater being, as far as we can judge from 130£ to 140£.— How I am publish the remainder I know not, without taking 2 or 300£ out of the funds—& what will you say to that.— I am stomachy & be blue deviled— I am daily growing very very old, very very cold & I daresay very sly. I will give you statistics of time spent on my coral-volume, not including all the work on board the Beagle— I commenced it 3 years & 7 months ago, & have done scarcely anything besides— I have actually spent 20 months out of this period on it! & nearly all the remainder sickness & visiting!!!

=== Publication and subsequent editions ===
The Structure and Distribution of Coral Reefs was published in May 1842, priced at 15 shillings, and was well received. A second edition was published in 1874, extensively revised and rewritten to take into account James Dwight Dana's 1872 publication Corals and Coral Islands, and work by Joseph Jukes.

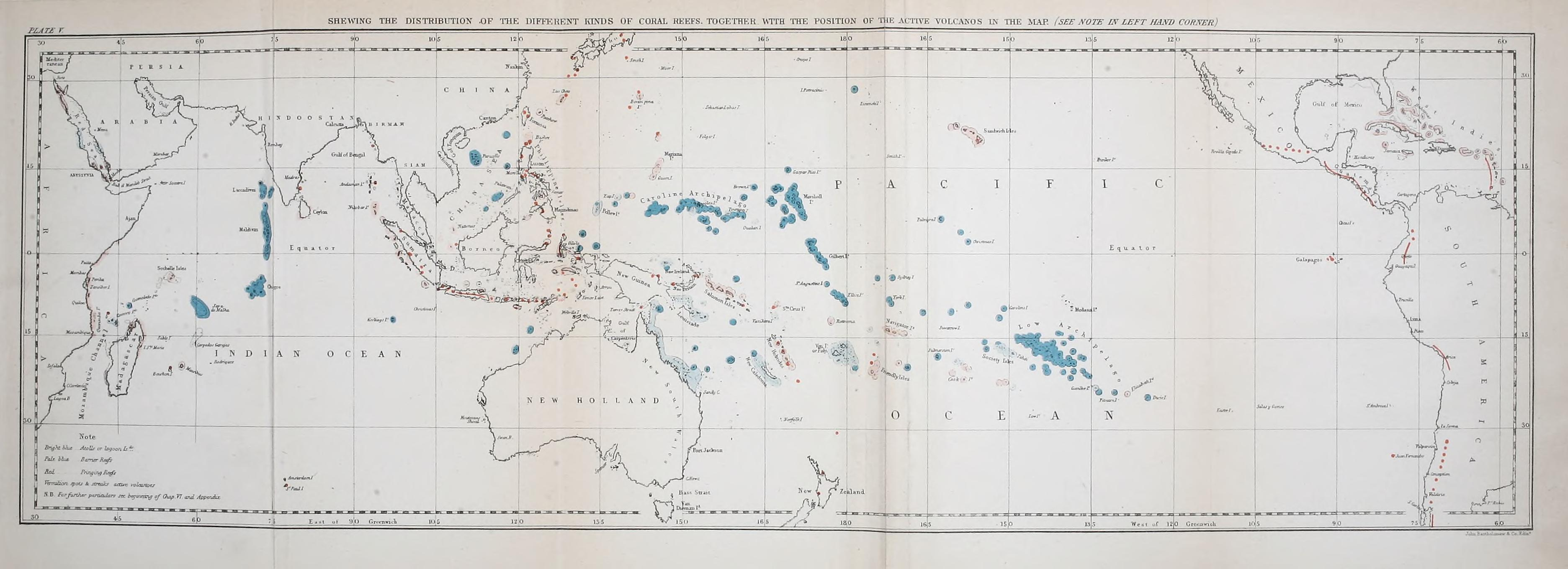
Map included in Darwin's book showing the world’s major groups of atolls and coral reefs known at that time

=== Structure of book ===
The book has a tightly logical structure, and presents a bold argument. Illustrations are used as an integral part of the argument, with numerous detailed charts and one large world map marked in colour showing all reefs known at that time. A brief introduction sets out the aims of the book.

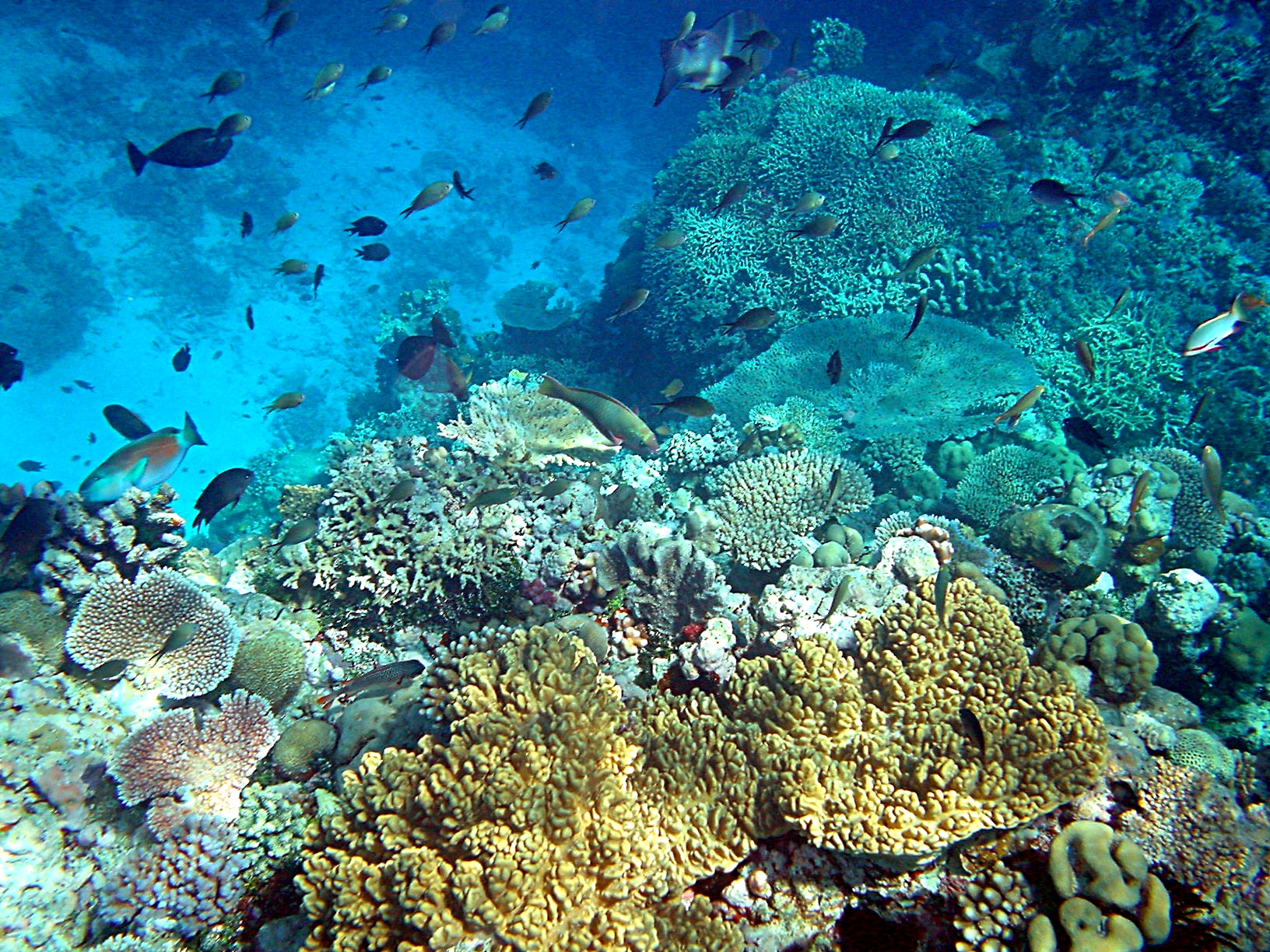
The first chapters of the book describe the kinds of corals forming each part of the various types of reef.

The first three chapters describe the various types of coral reef, each chapter starting with a section giving a detailed description of the reef Darwin had most information about, which he presents as a typical example of the type. Subsequent sections in each chapter then describe other reefs in comparison with the typical example. In the first chapter, Darwin describes atolls and lagoon islands, taking as his typical example his own detailed findings and the Beagle survey findings on the Keeling Islands. The second chapter similarly describes a typical barrier reef then compares it to others, and the third chapter gives a similar description of what Darwin called fringing or shore reefs. Having described the principal kinds of reef in detail, his finding was that the actual surface of the reef did not differ much. An atoll differs from an encircling barrier reef only in lacking the central island, and a barrier reef differs from a fringing reef only in its distance from the land and in enclosing a lagoon.

The fourth chapter on the distribution and growth of coral reefs examines the conditions in which they flourish, their rate of growth and the depths at which the reef building polyps can live, showing that they can only flourish at a very limited depth. In the fifth chapter he sets out his theory as a unified explanation for the findings of the previous chapters, overcoming the difficulties of treating the various kinds of reef as separate and the problem of reliance on the improbable assumption that underwater mountains just happened to be at the exact depth below sea level, by showing how barrier reefs and then atolls form as the land subsides, and fringing reefs are found along with evidence that the land is being elevated. This chapter ends with a summary of his theory illustrated with two woodcuts each showing two different stages of reef formation in relation to sea level.

In the sixth chapter he examines the geographical distribution of types of reef and its geological implications, using the large coloured map of the world to show vast areas of atolls and barrier reefs where the ocean bed was subsiding with no active volcanos, and vast areas with fringing reefs and volcanic outbursts where the land was rising. This chapter ends with a recapitulation which summarises the findings of each chapter and concludes by describing the global image as "a magnificent and harmonious picture of the movements, which the crust of the earth has within a late period undergone". A large appendix gives a detailed and exhaustive description of all the information he had been able to obtain on the reefs of the world.

This logical structure can be seen as a prototype for the organisation of On the Origin of Species, presenting the detail of various aspects of the problem, then setting out a theory explaining the phenomena, followed by a demonstration of the wider explanatory power of the theory. Unlike the Origin which was hurriedly put together as an abstract of his planned "big book", Coral Reefs is fully supported by citations and material gathered together in the Appendix. Coral Reefs is arguably the first volume of Darwin's huge treatise on his philosophy of nature, like his succeeding works showing how slow gradual change can account for the history of life. In presenting types of reef as an evolutionary series it demonstrated a rigorous methodology for historical sciences, interpreting patterns visible in the present as the results of history. In one passage he presents a particularly Malthusian view of a struggle for survival – "In an old-standing reef, the corals, which are so different in kind on different parts of it, are probably all adapted to the stations they occupy, and hold their places, like other organic beings, by a struggle one with another, and with external nature; hence we may infer that their growth would generally be slow, except under peculiarly favourable circumstances."

=== Reception ===
Having successfully completed and published the other books on the geology and zoology of the voyage, Darwin spent eight years on a major study of barnacles. Two volumes on Lepadidae (goose barnacles) were published in 1851. While he was still working on two volumes on the remaining barnacles, Darwin learnt to his delight in 1853 that the Royal Society had awarded him the Royal Medal for Natural Science. Joseph Dalton Hooker wrote telling him that "Pordock proposed you for the Coral Islands & Lepadidae, Bell followed seconding on the Lepadidae alone, & then followed such a shout of paeans for the Barnacles that you would have [smiled] to hear."

=== Late 19th-century controversy and tests of the theory ===
A major scientific controversy over the origin of coral reefs took place in the late 19th century, between supporters of Darwin's theory (such as the American geologist James Dwight Dana, who early in his career had seen coral reefs in Hawaii and Fiji during the 1838–1842 United States Exploring Expedition), and those who supported a rival theory put forward by the Scottish oceanographer John Murray, who participated in the 1872–76 Challenger expedition. Murray's theory challenged Darwin's notion of subsidence, proposing instead that coral reefs formed when accumulating mounds of calcareous marine sediments reached the shallow depths that could support the growth of corals. Amongst Murray's supporters was the independently wealthy American scientist Alexander Agassiz, who financed and undertook several expeditions to the Caribbean, Pacific and Indian Ocean regions to examine coral reefs in search of evidence to support Murray's theory, and to discredit Darwin.

A series of expeditions to test Darwin's theory by drilling on Funafuti atoll in the Ellice Islands (now part of Tuvalu) was conducted by the Royal Society of London for the purpose of investigating whether basalt or traces of shallow water organisms could be found at depth in the coral. Drilling occurred in 1896, 1897 and 1898, attaining a final depth of 1,114 feet 6 inches (339.70 m), still in coral. Professor Edgeworth David of the University of Sydney was a member of the 1896 expedition and leader of the 1897 expedition. At the time these results were regarded as inconclusive and it was not until the 1950s when, prior to carrying out nuclear bomb tests on Eniwetok, deep exploratory drilling through 4,200 feet (1,300 m) of coral to the underlying basalt finally vindicated Darwin's theory. However, the geologic history of atolls is more complex than Darwin (1842) and Davis (1920 & 1928) envisioned.

== Darwin's findings and later views ==
Darwin's interest on the biology of reef organisms was focussed on aspects related to his geological idea of subsidence; in particular, he was looking for confirmation that the reef building organisms could only live at shallow depths. FitzRoy's soundings at the Keeling Islands gave a depth limit for live coral of about 20 fathoms (37 m), and taking into account numerous observations by others, Darwin worked with a probable limit of 30 fathoms (55 m). Later findings suggest a limit of around 100 m (330 ft), still a small fraction of the depth of the ocean floor at 3,000–5,000 m (9,800–16,400 ft). Darwin recognised the importance of red algae, and he reviewed other organisms that could have helped to build the reefs. He thought they lived at similarly shallow depths, but banks formed at greater depths were found in the 1880s. Darwin reviewed the distribution of different species of coral across a reef. He thought that the seaward reefs most exposed to wind and waves were formed by massive corals and red algae; this would be the most active area of reef growth and so would cause a tendency for reefs to grow outwards once they reach sea level. He believed that higher temperatures and the calmer water of the lagoons favoured the greatest coral diversity. These ecological ideas are still current, and research on the details continues.

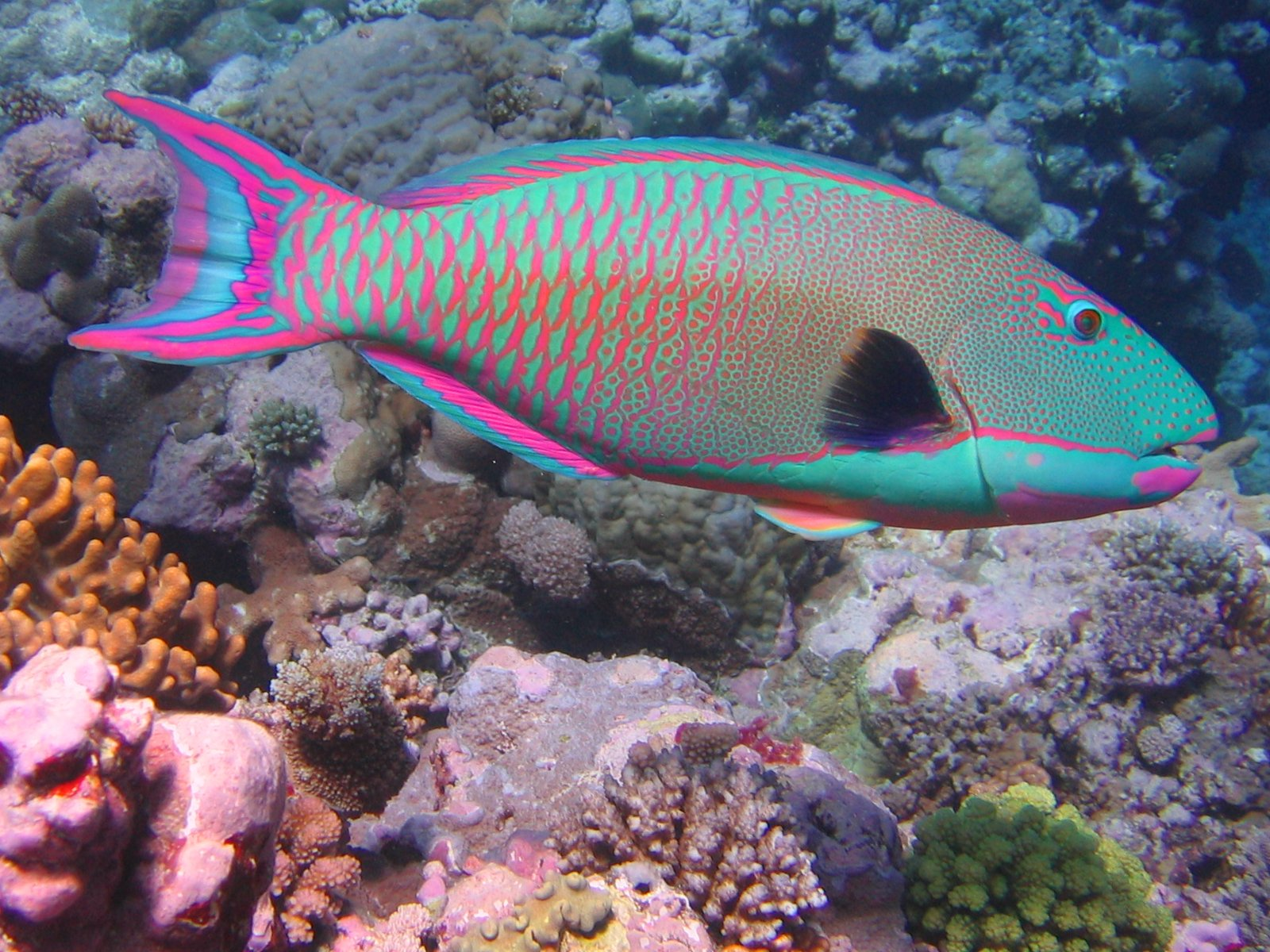
Darwin's investigations showed how coral eating organisms such as parrotfish controlled the growth of coral, and formed mudbanks.

In assessing the geology of the reef, Darwin showed his remarkable ability to collect facts and find patterns to reconstruct geological history on the basis of the very limited evidence available. He gave attention to the smallest detail. Having heard that parrotfish browsed on the living coral, he dissected specimens to find finely ground coral in their intestines. He concluded that such fish, and coral eating invertebrates such as Holothuroidea, could account for the banks of fine grained mud he found at the Keeling Islands; it showed also "that there are living checks to the growth of coral-reefs, and that the almost universal law of 'consume and be consumed,' holds good even with the polypifers forming those massive bulwarks, which are able to withstand the force of the open ocean."

His observations on the part played by organisms in the formation of the various features of reefs anticipated later studies. To establish the thickness of coral barrier reefs, he relied on the old nautical rule of thumb to project the slope of the land to that below sea level, and then applied his idea that the coral reef would slope much more steeply than the underlying land. He was fortunate to guess that the maximum depth of coral would be around 5,000 ft (1,500 m), as the first test bores conducted by the United States Atomic Energy Commission on Enewetak Atoll in 1952 drilled down through 4,610 ft (1,410 m) of coral before reaching the volcanic foundations. In Darwin's time no comparable thickness of fossil coral had been found on the continents, and when this was raised as a criticism of his theory neither he nor Lyell could find a satisfactory explanation. It is now thought that fossil reefs are usually broken up by tectonic movements, but at least two continental fossil reef complexes have been discovered to be about 3,000 ft (910 m) thick. While these findings have confirmed his argument that the islands were subsiding, his other attempts to show evidence of subsidence have been superseded by the discovery that glacial effects can cause changes in sea level.

In Darwin's global hypothesis, vast areas where the seabed was being elevated were marked by fringing reefs, sometimes around active volcanoes, and similarly huge areas where the ocean floor was subsiding were indicated by barrier reefs or atolls based on inactive volcanoes. These views received general support from deep sea drilling results in the 1980s. His idea that rising land would be balanced by subsidence in ocean areas has been superseded by plate tectonics, which he did not anticipate.

== See also ==
- Formation of coral reefs
- Darwin's paradox
- List of reefs
- Zimmerman's Competing Theory of Reef Formation
