= Robert Moorman =

American politician (1814–1873)

Robert Glenn Moorman (June 22, 1814 – October 5, 1873) was a South Carolina planter and politician.

== Family ==
Parents - Thomas Samuel Moorman (1775 – 1818) & Jemima Glenn Sims born 1786
Sister - Elizabeth D. Moorman born 1818, wife of Reuben Sims Chick
First Wife - Mary L. Kenner died 1845, daughter of Samuel Eskridge Kenner (1772? - February 2, 1844) & Lucy Goree (1783? - September 17, 1873)
Child with Mary - Thomas Samuel Moorman (March 24, 1842 – August 4, 1902), lawyer and Librarian of the South Carolina Supreme Court in the 1890s
Second Wife - Virginia C. Harrington (July 19, 1829 – March 17, 1861), daughter of Young John Harrington (April 5, 1784 - November 11, 1850) & Nancy Berry Calmes (August 5, 1786 - May 29, 1879)
Children with Virginia:

- Mary Adelaide Moorman (1853 – 1898)
- Elizabeth Theresa Moorman (1855 – June 27, 1877)
- Robert Glenn Moorman Jr. (November 15, 1857 – October 10, 1896)
- Nancy H. Moorman born 1858

Robert was grandfather of Thomas Samuel Moorman (February 7, 1875 – June 28, 1936) - Colonel U.S. Army
Great-grandfather of Thomas Samuel Moorman (July 11, 1910 – December 23, 1997) – Lt. Gen USAF, Superintendent United States Air Force Academy 1965 - 1970
Great-great-grandfather of Thomas S. Moorman Jr. - General USAF

== Government and military service ==
- South Carolina House of Representatives 1848 - 1852
- South Carolina Senate 1852 - 1855, resigned due to poor health, later served 1864 - 1865
- In October 1865 lost to Col. James H. Williams in race for State Senate representing Newberry District by vote of 401 to 369.
- Lt. Col. on staff of S.C. Gov. John Hugh Means 1852 - 1854
- Signed S.C. Secession document as delegate to the Ordinance of Secession Convention in December, 1860 representing Newberry County, South Carolina with Simeon Fair, John P. Kinard & Joseph Caldwell
- Member of the South Carolina Soldier's Board of Relief 1861 - 1864
- Second Lt. South Carolina Volunteers, 3rd Regiment, C.S.A.

== General information ==
Robert Moorman owned a large plantation near Maybinton, Newberry County, South Carolina, where he also bred horses. He was an ardent States' Rights supporter. He was not a college graduate, liked dancing and was a devoted Christian of the Methodist faith. After moving to the town of Newberry, South Carolina from Maybinton in 1866, he was a business partner with Albert G. (Bert) Maybin and brothers Reuben Sims Chick (also Moorman's brother-in-law) and Pettus Wales Chick in a Newberry, South Carolina mercantile company named Moorman & Maybin. He also owned a grocery in Mollohon Row in Newberry. He was a Director of Newberry National Bank 1871. he died at his home in Newberry on October 5, 1873, buried Rosemont Cemetery, Newberry, South Carolina. His tombstone inscription is: "Mark the perfect man and behold the upright for the end of that man is peace"
