= Thomas S. Moorman =

United States Air Force general

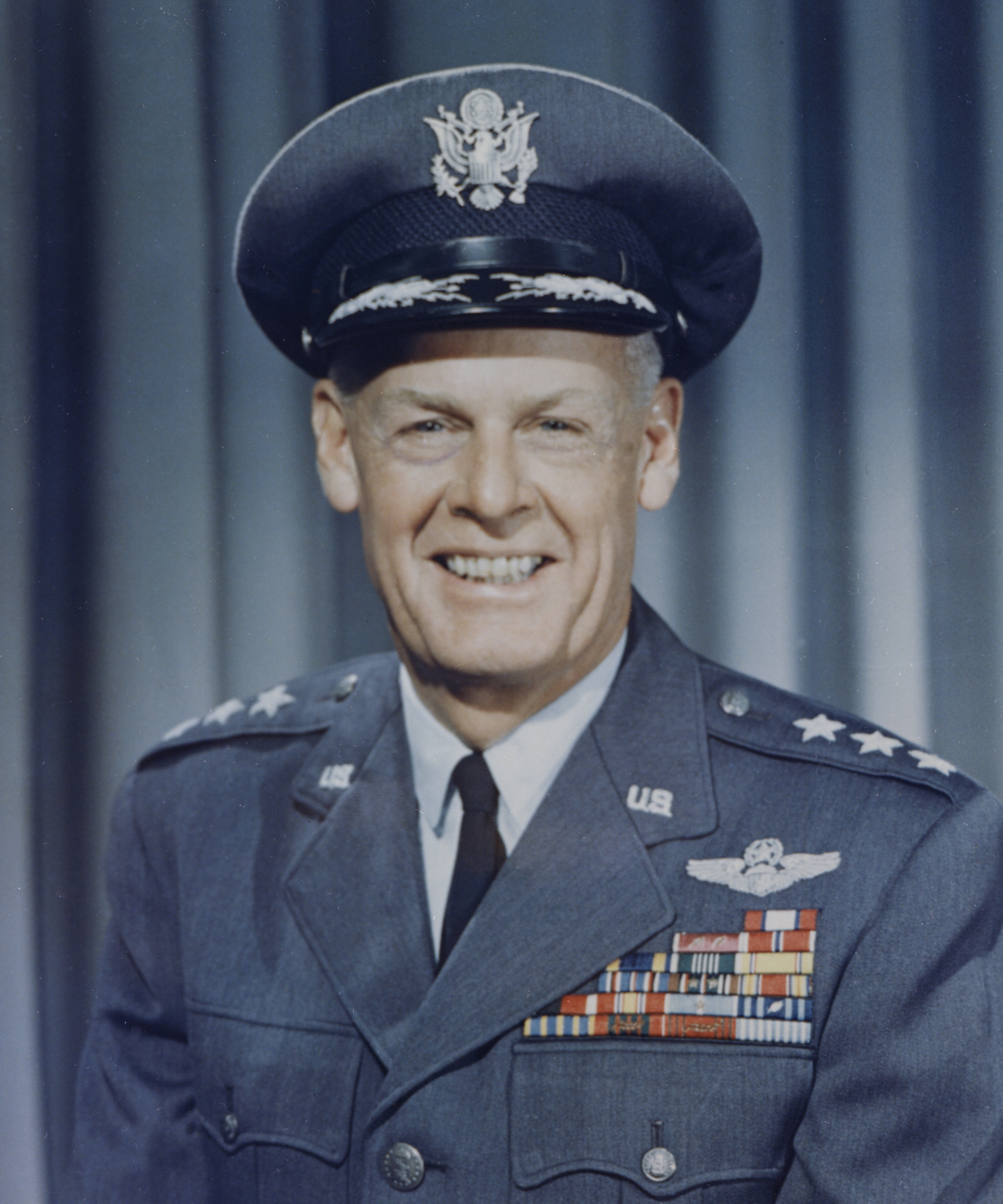
- Lieutenant General Thomas S. Moorman pictured as Superintendent of the United States Air Force Academy
- Born: July 11, 1910; Presidio of Monterey, California, U.S.
- Died: December 23, 1997 (aged 87); Sterling, Virginia, U.S.
- Relatives: General Thomas S. Moorman Jr. (son); Robert Glenn Moorman (great-grandfather)
- Military career
- Allegiance: United States
- Branch: United States Army Air Corps (1933–41); United States Army Air Forces (1941–47); United States Air Force (1947–70)
- Service years: 1933–1970
- Rank: Lieutenant General
- Commands: United States Air Force Academy; Thirteenth Air Force; 2143d Air Weather Wing; 21st Weather Squadron
- Conflicts: World War II; Korean War
- Awards: Army Distinguished Service Medal; Air Force Distinguished Service Medal; Legion of Merit (3); Bronze Star Medal; Air Medal

Lieutenant General Thomas Samuel Moorman (July 11, 1910 – December 23, 1997) was a senior officer in the United States Air Force who served as the fifth Superintendent of the United States Air Force Academy at Colorado Springs, Colorado.

== Early life ==
Moorman was born at the Presidio of Monterey, California on July 11, 1910. He attended John J. Phillips High School in Birmingham, Alabama. He graduated from the United States Military Academy class of 1933 and entered the Air Corps flying training school at Randolph Field, Texas.

== Military career ==
Moorman earned his pilot wings in October 1934 and was assigned to the 4th Observation Squadron, 5th Composite Group at Luke Field, Hawaii. In July 1936, Moorman was reassigned to the 97th Reconnaissance Squadron at Mitchel Field, New York for a 12-month tour.

In 1937, Moorman entered the field of meteorology, obtained a Master of Science degree from the California Institute of Technology and embarked on a sphere of activity which would dominate the next 20 years of his career. After a two-year assignment as Weather Officer at Randolph Field, Texas, he gained valuable information in meteorology through further study at the Massachusetts Institute of Technology.

In July 1941, Moorman was assigned to Air Corps Headquarters in Washington, D.C., where he served as chief climatologist and assistant director of the Air Corps Research Center and liaison officer to the United States Weather Bureau. In April 1943, he completed a course at the Command and General Staff School in Kansas. From May 1943 until December 1943, Moorman was commanding officer of the 21st Weather Squadron, first at Bradley Field, Connecticut, and later in England.

Moorman became staff weather officer and later director of weather for Ninth Air Force in the European Theater of Operations, a position he held from January 1944 until December 1944. From January 1945 until June 1945, he served as commanding officer of the 21st Weather Squadron and Staff Weather Officer for Ninth Air Force. After V-J Day in 1945, Moorman returned to the United States as deputy chief of staff for Air Weather Service. One year later he became air weather officer at Headquarters Army Air Forces and remained in that position until he entered the Air War College at Maxwell Air Force Base, Alabama. In June 1948, Moorman graduated from the War College after completing a year of training.

From July 1948 until June 1951, Moorman served with the United States Far East Air Force in Tokyo as commander of the 2143d Air Weather Wing (now the 1st Weather Wing), and upon his return to the United States he became deputy commander of the Air Weather Service at Andrews Air Force Base, Maryland.

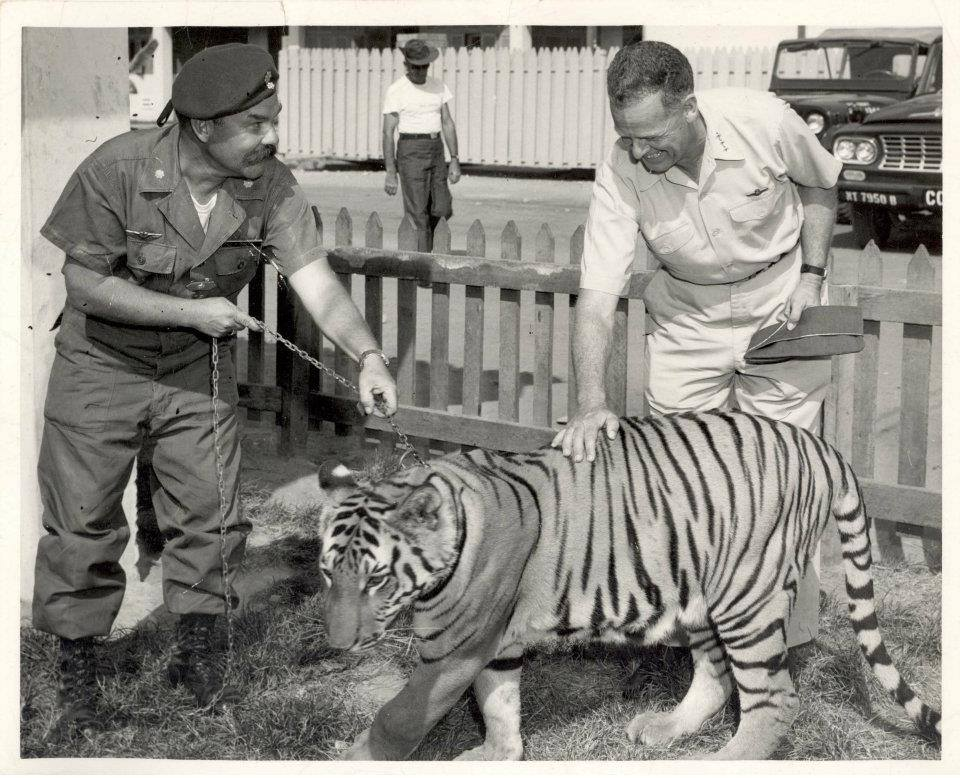
Lieutenant General Moorman in Sóc Trăng, Vietnam, May 1963.

On April 22, 1954, Moorman's 16 years of weather operations culminated in his appointment as Air Weather Service commander, responsible for providing environmental support to the Air Force and Army through weather central forecast centers, base weather stations, observation sites, worldwide weather reconnaissance and atmospheric sampling.

Returning to the Far East in 1958, Moorman assumed command of the Thirteenth Air Force at Clark Air Base, Philippines. He was responsible for air operations throughout Southeast Asia, as well as for the air defense of the Philippines in conjunction with the Philippine Air Force.

On July 28, 1961, Moorman became vice commander in chief, Headquarters Pacific Air Forces, Hickam Air Force Base, Hawaii, and on July 1, 1965, Moorman became Superintendent of the United States Air Force Academy at Colorado Springs, Colorado.

Among Moorman's awards and decorations are the Army Distinguished Service Medal, Air Force Distinguished Service Medal, Legion of Merit with two oak leaf clusters, Bronze Star Medal, the Air Medal, and the Army Commendation Medal. His foreign decorations include the French Croix de Guerre with palm, the Belgian Croix de Guerre with palm, the Luxembourg War Cross and the French Aeronautical Medal. He retired August 1, 1970, and died December 23, 1997, at the Falcons Landing retirement community in Sterling, Virginia. Moorman was interred at the United States Air Force Academy Cemetery on December 29, 1997.

Military offices
Preceded by Robert H. Warren	Superintendent of the United States Air Force Academy; 1965—1970	Succeeded by Albert P. Clark
