= Samuel E. Anderson =

United States Air Force general (1906–1982)

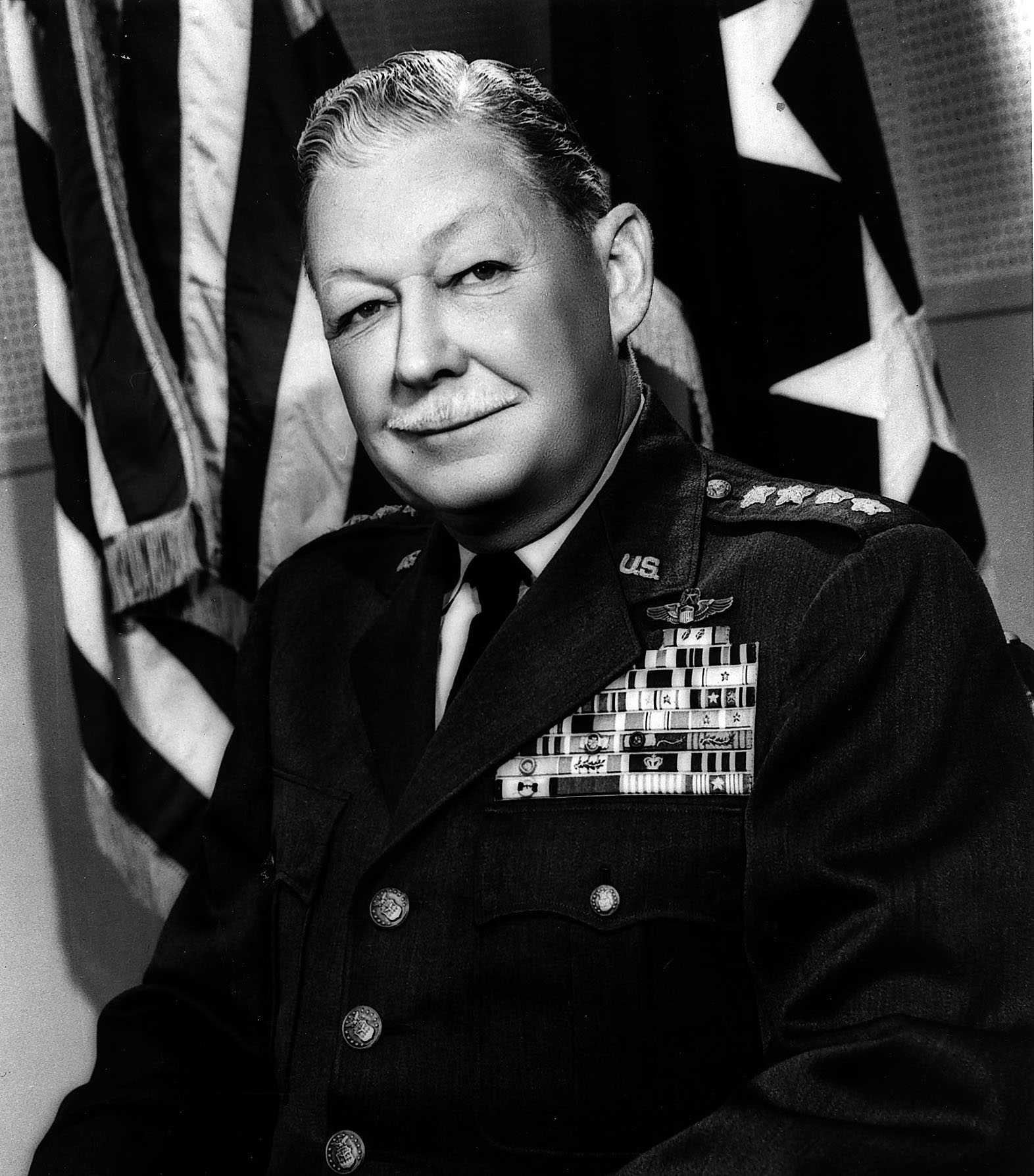
- General Samuel E. Anderson
- Born: January 6, 1906; Greensboro, North Carolina, U.S.
- Died: September 12, 1982 (aged 76); San Antonio, Texas, U.S.
- Burial place: United States Air Force Academy Cemetery
- Military career
- Allegiance: United States of America
- Branch: United States Army; United States Air Force
- Service years: 1928–1963
- Rank: General
- Commands: Air Materiel Command/Logistics Command; Air Research and Development Command; Fifth Air Force; Eighth Air Force; Ninth Bomber Command; 3rd Bombardment Wing
- Conflicts: World War II; Korean War
- Awards: Distinguished Service Medal (4); Silver Star; Distinguished Flying Cross; Bronze Star; Air Medal

General Samuel Egbert Anderson (January 6, 1906 – September 12, 1982) was a United States Air Force four-star general who served as commander of the Air Materiel Command.

== Early life and education ==
He was born in Greensboro, North Carolina, in 1906. He graduated from the United States Military Academy at West Point, New York, and was commissioned a second lieutenant in the Coast Artillery upon graduation on June 9, 1928.

== Military career ==
At West Point in 1928

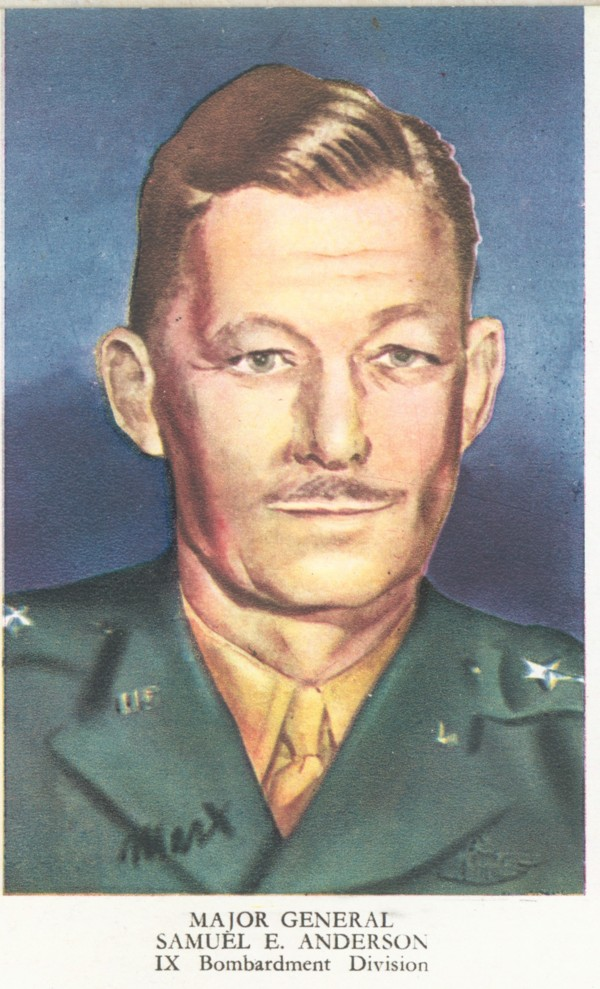
Watercolor portrait of Major General Samuael E. Anderson, 9th Air Force, United States Army Air Force 1945

Assigned immediately to the Air Corps Primary Flying School, Brooks Field, Texas, Lieutenant Anderson completed the course a year later. He then proceeded to Kelly Field, Texas, to attend the Observation Course at the Air Corps Advanced Flying School. After graduating on October 15, 1929, he joined the 5th Observation Squadron at Mitchel Field, Long Island, New York. On November 1, 1929, he transferred to the Air Corps.

From September 1932 to February 1939, Anderson saw service at Chanute Field, Rantoul, Illinois, acted as flying instructor and performed various duties at Kelly Field, Texas.

Ordered to Wheeler Field, Schofield Barracks, Hawaii, in March 1939, he became commanding officer of the Sixth Pursuit Squadron. In November 1940, he was designated Wing S-3, plans and training officer, 18th Composite Wing.

Returning to Langley Field, Virginia in May 1941, he served in various capacities. In August 1941, Anderson was brought into the Air War Plans Division where he helped author AWPD-1, the American air war plan which greatly contributed to the eventual defeat of Nazi Germany. In October 1941, Anderson transferred to the Office of the Assistant Chief Air Staff, Headquarters Air Force, Washington D.C.

Anderson's next assignment was with the Operations Division, War Department General Staff, Washington, D.C., where he served from March 1942 until May 1943.

During this period, he saw combat in the Pacific Theater, and in June 1942 was awarded the Silver Star "for gallantry in action in the vicinity of Port Moresby in Salamaua, New Guinea."

Transferring to the European Theater of Operations in May 1943 as administrative inspector of the 3rd Bombardment Wing (Medium), he assumed command of the organization July 12. Two months later, he was awarded the Distinguished Flying Cross "for extraordinary achievement while leading his Bombardment Wing on two combat missions over enemy-occupied Europe on 16 July and 2 August 1943."

In October 1943, General Anderson was designated commanding general of the new IX Bomber Command of the revamped Ninth Air Force, a command he held until the end of the war. During his period of command, 10 of the 11 groups of IX Bomber Command were awarded the Presidential Unit Citation.

Returning to the United States in May 1945, General Anderson became chief of staff, Continental Air Force, Bolling Field, Washington, D.C.

In June 1945, he was awarded the Distinguished Service Medal for unusual ability and conspicuous technical proficiency in activating, developing, training and directing the operations of the Ninth Bombardment Division (Medium) during the period of July 1943 to December 1944 while serving as commanding general.

In February 1946, he became a member of the Joint Strategic Survey Committee, Office of the Joint Chiefs of Staff, Washington, D.C.

In February 1948, he was appointed director of plans and operations in the Office of the Deputy Chief of Staff for Operations at U.S. Air Force Headquarters and served in that capacity until August 1950.

From August 1950 to May 1953, he served as commanding general of the Eighth Air Force, with headquarters at Carswell Air Force Base, Texas.

On May 31, 1953, he relieved Lieutenant General Glenn O. Barcus as commanding general of the Fifth Air Force in Korea. Upon assuming command of the Fifth Air Force, he was promoted to the rank of lieutenant general.

In May 1954, he was assigned as director, Weapons Systems Evaluation Group (Office of the Assistant Secretary of Defense-Research and Development). He held this position until his assignment as commander of Air Research and Development Command August 1, 1957.

He was promoted to his four-star rank on March 10, 1959, and named on the same day as commander of the Air Materiel Command, Wright-Patterson Air Force Base, Ohio, remaining in this capacity upon the redesignation of AMC to the Air Force Logistics Command on April 1, 1961.

== Retirement, death, and legacy ==
Anderson retired from the Air Force on August 1, 1963, and died on September 12, 1982 at Brooke Army Medical Center. He was buried at the United States Air Force Academy Cemetery.
