= Thomas S. Moorman Jr. =

United States Air Force general (1940–2020)

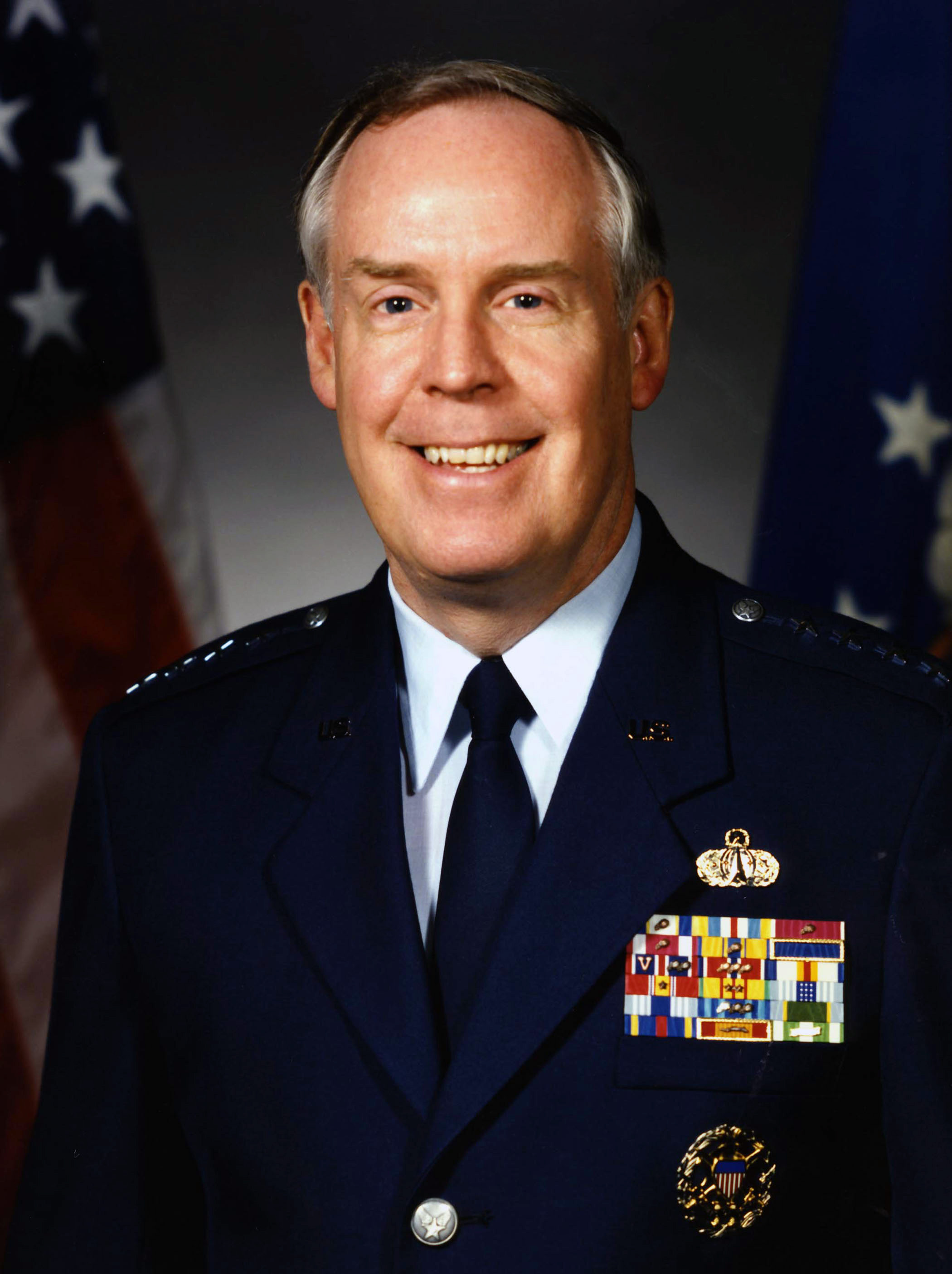
- Born: Thomas Samuel Moorman Jr. November 16, 1940; Washington, D.C., US
- Died: June 18, 2020 (aged 79); Bethesda, Maryland, US
- Relatives: Lieutenant General Thomas S. Moorman (father); Robert Glenn Moorman (great-great-grandfather)
- Military career
- Allegiance: United States
- Branch: United States Air Force
- Service years: 1962–1997
- Rank: General
- Commands: Air Force Space Command
- Conflicts: Vietnam War
- Awards: Air Force Distinguished Service Medal (2); Defense Superior Service Medal; Legion of Merit (2)

Thomas Samuel Moorman Jr. (November 16, 1940 – June 18, 2020) was a United States Air Force officer who served as Vice Chief of Staff of the United States Air Force from July 1994 to August 1997.

== Early life ==
Moorman was born in Washington, D.C., on November 16, 1940, the son of Thomas S. Moorman. He was commissioned through the Air Force Reserve Officer Training Corps program as a distinguished military graduate in 1962.

== Military career ==
Moorman served in a variety of intelligence and reconnaissance-related positions within the United States and worldwide. While stationed at Peterson Air Force Base, Colorado, in 1982, he became deeply involved in the planning and organizing for the establishment of Air Force Space Command. During his tour at The Pentagon in 1987, he also provided program management direction for development and procurement of Air Force surveillance, communications, navigation, and weather satellites, space launch vehicles, anti-satellite weapons, and ground-based and airborne strategic radars, communications, and command centers. He additionally represented the Air Force in the Strategic Defense Initiative program and was authorized to accept the SDI program execution responsibilities on behalf of the Air Force. As commander and vice commander of Air Force Space Command, Moorman was responsible for operating military space systems, ground-based radars and missile warning satellites, the nation's space launch centers at Patrick Air Force Base and Vandenberg Air Force Base, the worldwide network of space surveillance radars, as well as maintaining the intercontinental ballistic missile (ICBM) force.

Since retiring from the United States Air Force, Moorman was the partner in charge of the Satellite & Hybrid Communications Team of Booz Allen Hamilton. From 1997 to 2009, he served on the board of directors of the Space Foundation, serving as chairman of the board from 2008 to 2009. Moorman died at the National Institutes of Health on June 18, 2020, at the age of 79.

== Education ==
- 1962 Bachelor's degree in history and political science, Dartmouth College, Hanover, New Hampshire.
- 1965 Squadron Officer School, Maxwell Air Force Base, Ala.
- 1972 Master's degree in business administration, Western New England College, Springfield, Massachusetts.
- 1975 Air Command and Staff College, Maxwell Air Force Base, Ala.
- 1975 Master's degree in political science, Auburn University, Ala.
- 1979 Air War College, by seminar
- 1980 National War College, Fort Lesley J. McNair, Washington, D.C.

== Assignments ==
1. July 1962 – August 1965, intelligence officer, B-47 bombardment wing, Schilling Air Force Base, Kansas
2. August 1965 – October 1966, mission planner, 9th Strategic Reconnaissance Wing, Beale Air Force Base, California
3. October 1966 – November 1967, operations officer, 432nd Reconnaissance Technical Squadron, Udon Royal Thai Air Force Base, Thailand
4. November 1967 – November 1970, reconnaissance intelligence staff officer, 497th Reconnaissance Technical Group, Wiesbaden-Schierstein, West Germany
5. November 1970 – August 1975, assistant director of evaluation, later executive officer, Air Force Special Projects Production Facility, Westover Air Force Base, Massachusetts
6. August 1975 – August 1979, executive, later deputy director of plans and programs, Office of Space Systems, Office of the Secretary of the Air Force, Washington, D.C.
7. August 1979 – June 1980, National War College, Fort Lesley J. McNair, Washington, D.C.
8. June 1980 – August 1981, deputy military assistant to the secretary of the Air Force, Washington, D.C.
9. August 1981 – March 1982, director of space operations, North American Aerospace Defense Command, Cheyenne Mountain Complex, Colorado
10. March 1982 – August 1982, deputy director, Space Defense, Office of the Deputy Chief of Staff for Plans, Peterson Air Force Base, Colorado
11. August 1982 – July 1984, first director, commander's group, Air Force Space Command, Peterson Air Force Base, Colorado
12. July 1984 – March 1985, vice commander, 1st Space Wing, Peterson Air Force Base, Colorado
13. March 1985 – October 1987, director of space systems, Office of the Secretary of the Air Force, Washington, D.C.
14. October 1987 – March 1990, director of Space and Strategic Defense Initiative programs, Office of the Assistant Secretary of the Air Force for Acquisitions, the Pentagon, Washington, D.C.
15. October 1987 – March 1990, special assistant for Strategic Defense Initiative to the vice commander of Air Force Systems Command, Andrews Air Force Base, Maryland
16. March 1990 – March 1992, commander, Air Force Space Command, Peterson Air Force Base, Colorado
17. March 1992 – July 1994, vice commander, Air Force Space Command, Peterson Air Force Base, Colorado
18. July 1994 – 1997, vice chief of staff, Headquarters U.S. Air Force, Washington, D.C.
19. August 1, 1997 – retired

== Major awards and decorations ==
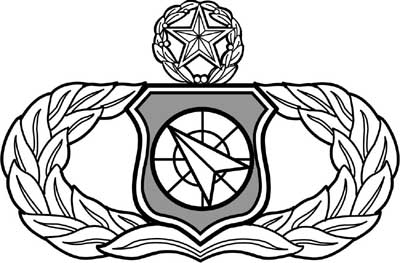
Command Space and Missile Operations Badge

- Air Force Distinguished Service Medal with oak leaf cluster
- Defense Superior Service Medal
- Legion of Merit with oak leaf cluster
- Meritorious Service Medal with oak leaf cluster
- Air Force Commendation Medal with oak leaf cluster
- National Intelligence Distinguished Service Medal
- Space Foundation General James E. Hill Lifetime Space Achievement Award.

== Effective dates of promotion ==
- Second Lieutenant Jul 10, 1962
- First Lieutenant Jun 9, 1965
- Captain Jan 2, 1967
- Major May 1, 1973
- Lieutenant Colonel Nov 1, 1978
- Colonel Jul 1, 1981
- Brigadier General Apr 1, 1985
- Major General Feb 1, 1988
- Lieutenant General Apr 1, 1990
- General Aug 1, 1994

== Personal ==
Moorman was the fourth generation in his family to bear the name Thomas Samuel Moorman. His grandfather Thomas Moorman (February 7, 1875 – June 28, 1936) served in the U.S. Army, retiring as a colonel. His father was known as Thomas Moorman Jr. when he attended the U.S. Military Academy.

Moorman was buried at Arlington National Cemetery on December 1, 2021.

Military offices
Preceded by Michael P.C. Carns	Vice Chief of Staff of the United States Air Force; 1994–1997	Succeeded by Ralph Eberhart
