= Avery Kay =

Colonel Avery Kay, USAF, (October 29, 1919 - October 29, 2015) was a United States Air Force officer and Master Navigator best known for being the principal advocate of the A-10 Warthog attack aircraft.

Born on October 29, 1919, Colonel Kay joined the U.S. Army Air Corps as it transitioned to being the U.S. Army Air Forces at the beginning of World War II. Following initial flight training as a navigator, he qualified as a navigator in the B-17 Flying Fortress and was assigned to a bomb group based in Great Britain, during which time he flew multiple combat bombing missions against enemy targets in continental Europe. He was also the Lead Navigator for the Schweinfurt Raid.

Following the end of World War II, Kay transferred his commission to the newly established U.S. Air Force in September 1947 and served in various operational and staff assignments during the Cold War, to include service in the Korean War and the Vietnam War.

In the late 1960s, Kay was assigned to Headquarters Air Force at the Pentagon in the Air Staff's Concepts and Doctrine Division. In this assignment, he served as a primary action officer to the division director, Major General Richard Yudkin, USAF. With its emphasis on nuclear-armed strategic jet bombers of the Strategic Air Command (SAC) during the 1950s and 1960s Cold War era, and the fighter aircraft of the Tactical Air Command (TAC) that were becoming the USAF's predominant combat arm during the Vietnam War, Avery believed that the Air Force had never adequately supported the close air support (CAS) mission in support of the U.S. Army or NATO/Allied ground forces and he convinced General Yudkin that this was a worthy battle. Their advocacy of the program initially known as "A-X" for a dedicated ground attack and CAS aircraft became a special project, done in the face of opposition from senior USAF leadership, especially that group of colonels and general officers from the USAF fighter community known as the "fighter lobby" or "fighter mafia" who advocated high tech, high performance, single seat fighter aircraft as a sole solution for all the USAF's tactical aviation requirements.

Colonel Kay retired from the Air Force in 1972 and died on his 96th birthday in 2015. He was buried in Arlington National Cemetery with full military honors, to include a "missing man" flyover by four A-10 aircraft.
