= United States Air Force Academy Cemetery =

Service academy cemetery

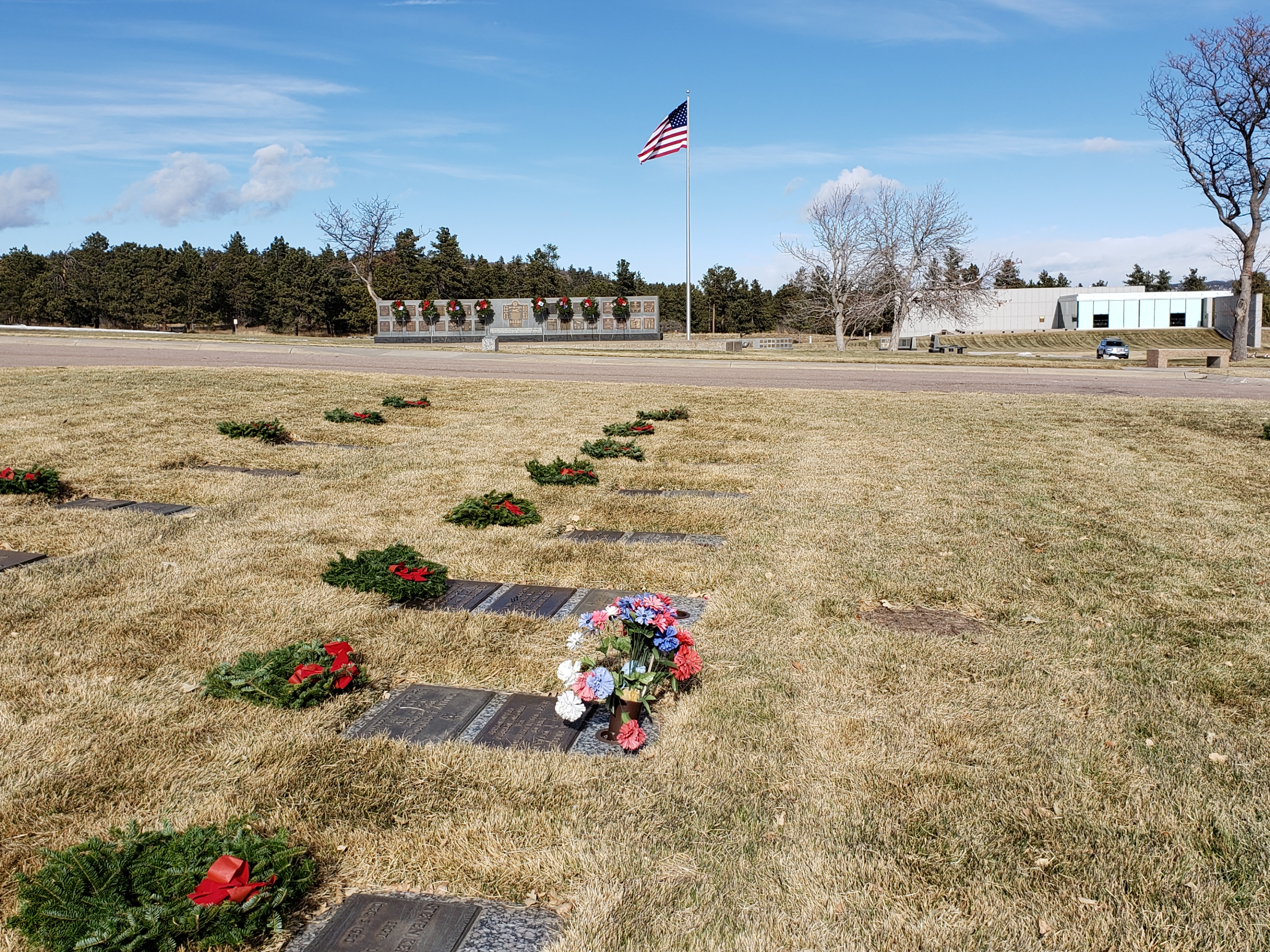
- Interactive map of United States Air Force Academy Cemetery

Details
- Established: 22 September 1958 (68 years ago)
- Location: Parade Loop. Colorado Springs, El Paso County, Colorado, 80840
- Country: United States
- Coordinates: 39°00′55.1″N 104°51′17.8″W
- Type: Military
- Owned by: 10th Air Base Wing
- No. of graves: ~2,500
- Website: https://www.usafa.af.mil/Units/10th-Air-Base-Wing/Mission-Support-Group/Mortuary-Affairs/

The United States Air Force Academy Cemetery is a cemetery at the United States Air Force Academy in Colorado Springs, Colorado, United States. It is administered by the 10th Air Base Wing.

== History ==
The U.S. Air Force Academy cemetery was established in 1958. It accepts burials for graduates of the Air Force Academy, personnel assigned to the Academy, USAF officers in the rank of Lieutenant General and above, recipients of the Air Force Cross or Medal of Honor, along with their spouses and dependent children. As of 2020 it hosts approximately 2,500 interments.

== Notable interments ==
- Medal of Honor recipients
  - William J. Crawford, for action in World War II; US Army retired Master Sergeant and long-time janitor-student mentor at the Academy
- General officers
  - Samuel E. Anderson, Commander of 5th Air Force, Korean War.
  - Salvador E. Felices, First Puerto Rican to reach the rank of Major General in the United States Air Force. Pilot of the first flight of a KC-135.
  - Harold L. George, espoused precision daylight bombing methods, unofficial leader of the Bomber Mafia, first leader of Air Transport Command
  - Haywood S. Hansell, one of the chief architects of the concept of daylight precision bombing during World War II
  - Hubert R. Harmon, first Superintendent of the Air Force Academy
  - Curtis LeMay, Air Force Chief of Staff and the father of Strategic Air Command (SAC)
  - John P. McConnell, sixth Air Force Chief of Staff
  - Robin Olds, Brigadier General, United States Air Force (Ret.) and “Triple Ace”.
  - Samuel C. Phillips, Air Force four-star general, Director of Apollo Program through Apollo 11.
  - John Dale Ryan, seventh Air Force Chief of Staff
  - Donavon F. Smith, Air Force lieutenant general and fighter ace
  - Carl Spaatz, first Air Force Chief of Staff
  - Louis L. Wilson Jr., Commander of Pacific Air Forces
  - Richard Yudkin, major general
  - Don Z. Zimmerman, first Dean of Faculty at the United States Air Force Academy
- Valorous Award Recipients
  - Col. Kennith F. Hite, awarded the Silver Star and three Distinguished Flying Crosses during 203 combat missions in Korea and Vietnam.
  - Col. Kelly F. Cook, combat veteran of three wars, recipient of the Distinguished Flying Cross, Air Medal and Purple Heart. Member of the Academy's original instructional cadre when it opened in the late 1950s. Declared Missing-in-Action November 10, 1967 when his F-4 went down over Quang Tri Province.
  - Major Victor Joe Apodaca recipient of the Distinguished Flying Cross and Air Medal. U.S. Air Force Academy Class of 1961, shot down in 1967 over Dong Hoi, North Vietnam in his RF-4C and declared Missing in Action until 2001.
- Purple Heart Recipients
  - Laura A. Piper, first female Air Force Academy graduate to be awarded the Purple Heart, killed April 14, 1994 (Piper was a passenger on a UH-60 Black Hawk Helicopter and was shot down due to a friendly fire incident during a non-combat humanitarian aid mission after Operation Desert Storm).
  - Maj. David L. Brodeur, died from wounds sustained from enemy gunfire. He was an advisor to the Afghan Command and Control Center under the NATO Air Training Command at the Kabul International Airport (Operation Enduring Freedom in Afghanistan); awarded the Bronze Star Medal and Purple Heart, killed April 27, 2011.
  - Maj. Philip D. Ambard, died from wounds sustained from enemy gunfire. He was an advisor to the Afghan Command and Control Center under the NATO Air Training Command at the Kabul International Airport (Operation Enduring Freedom in Afghanistan); awarded the Bronze Star Medal and Purple Heart, killed April 27, 2011.
  - Capt. David I. Lyon, killed in action from an enemy vehicle-born improvised explosive device was detonated near his convoy during Operation Enduring Freedom in Kabul, Afghanistan. He was a combat advisor, working with the Combined Joint Special Operations Task Force - Afghanistan; awarded the Bronze Star Medal and Purple Heart, killed December 27, 2013.
  - Maj. Rodolfo I. Rodriguez, died from wounds sustained from an improvised explosive device at a hotel in Islamabad, Pakistan while deployed to the U.S. Embassy (Pakistan) in support of Operation Enduring Freedom. He was posthumously awarded the Bronze Star Medal, Purple Heart, Meritorious Service Medal and Air Force Combat Action Medal, killed September 20, 2008.

=== Others ===
- Matt Fong, Air Force Reserve Command officer, California State Treasurer

== See also ==
- List of cemeteries in Colorado
