= General Ely =

General Ely may refer to:

- Hanson Edward Ely (1867–1958), U.S. Army major general
- William J. Ely (1911–2017), U.S. Army lieutenant general
- Paul Ély (1897–1975), French Army general
