= Kenneth E. Fields =

United States Army officer (1909–1996)

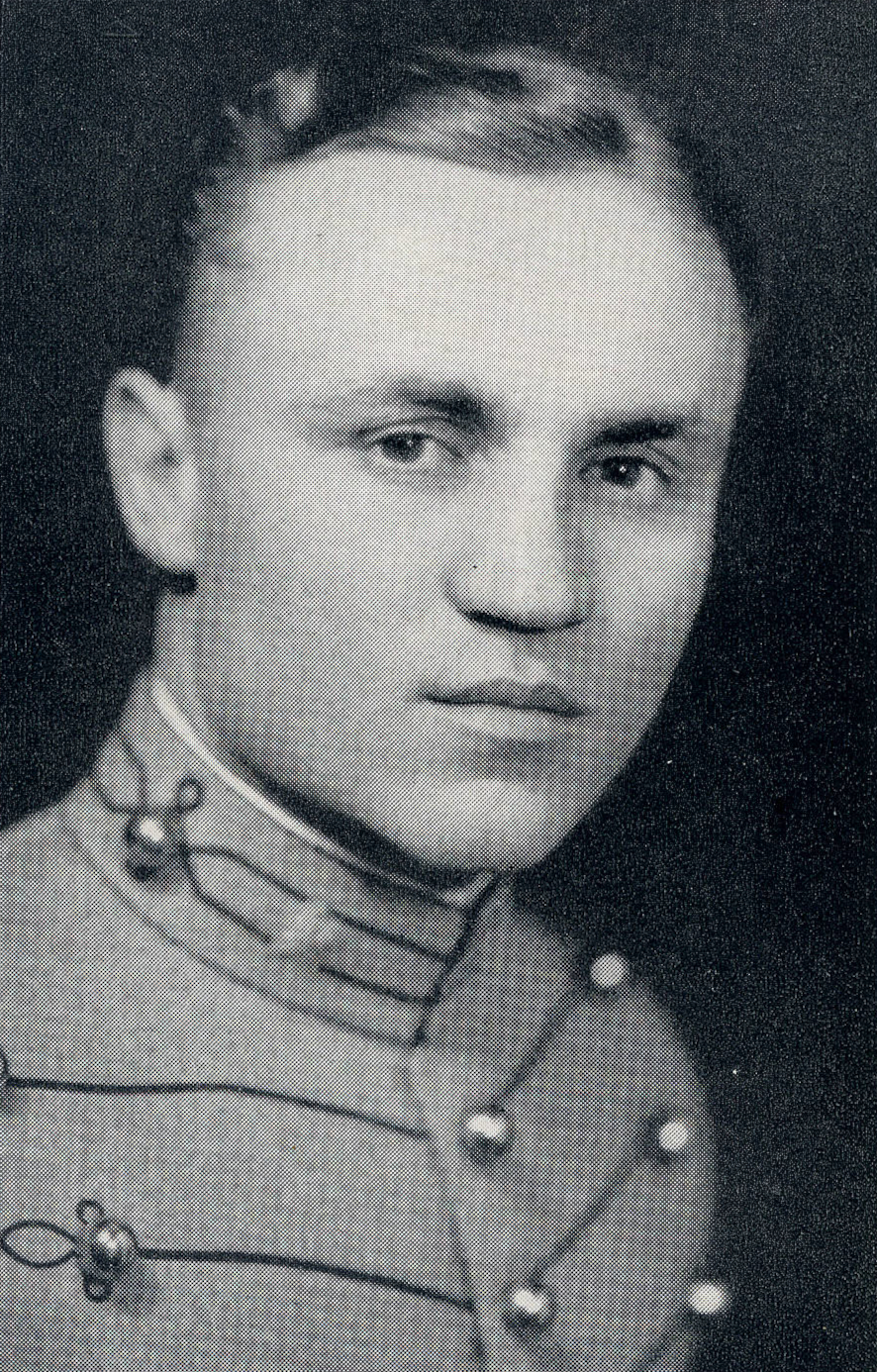
- As a West Point cadet
- Born: 1 February 1909; Elkhart, Indiana, United States
- Died: 1 July 1996 (aged 87); Stamford, Connecticut, United States
- Spouse: Frederica Hastings
- Children: 3
- Military career
- Allegiance: United States
- Branch: United States Army
- Service years: 1933–1955
- Rank: Brigadier General
- Service number: O-18957
- Unit: Corps of Engineers
- Commands: 56th Engineer Battalion; 1159th Engineer Combat Group
- Conflicts: World War II; Battle of Remagen
- Awards: Army Distinguished Service Medal; Silver Star; Bronze Star Medal; Military Order of Merit (Iran)
- Other work: General manager of the United States Atomic Energy Commission

Kenneth E. Fields (1 February 1909 – 1 July 1996) was a United States Army officer who commanded the 1159th Engineer Combat Group in the Battle of Remagen during World War II, for which he was awarded the Silver Star for valor.

Fields graduated as top cadet from the United States Military Academy class of 1933 and was commissioned in the United States Army Corps of Engineers. He earned master's degrees in engineering from the Massachusetts Institute of Technology in 1938 and from Harvard University in 1939. After World War II ended he joined the Manhattan Project. He became the assistant to the director for military applications at the United States Atomic Energy Commission in 1947 and became its general manager upon his retirement from the Army in 1955.

== Early life ==
Kenneth E. Fields was born in Elkhart, Indiana, on 1 February 1909, the son of Edward E. Fields, a brick and masonry contractor, and Luella Geneva Fields. He had a sister, Zelma. He attended Elkhart High School, where he joined the varsity American football team in 1924, his junior year, when the team went undefeated and went on to win the state championship. The following year he was a punter and fullback on a team that lost only one game. He matriculated to the University of Illinois, where he hoped to become a civil engineer. He played on the football team as a passer and kicker under Robert Zuppke. The Illinois team won the Big Ten Conference championship in 1928.

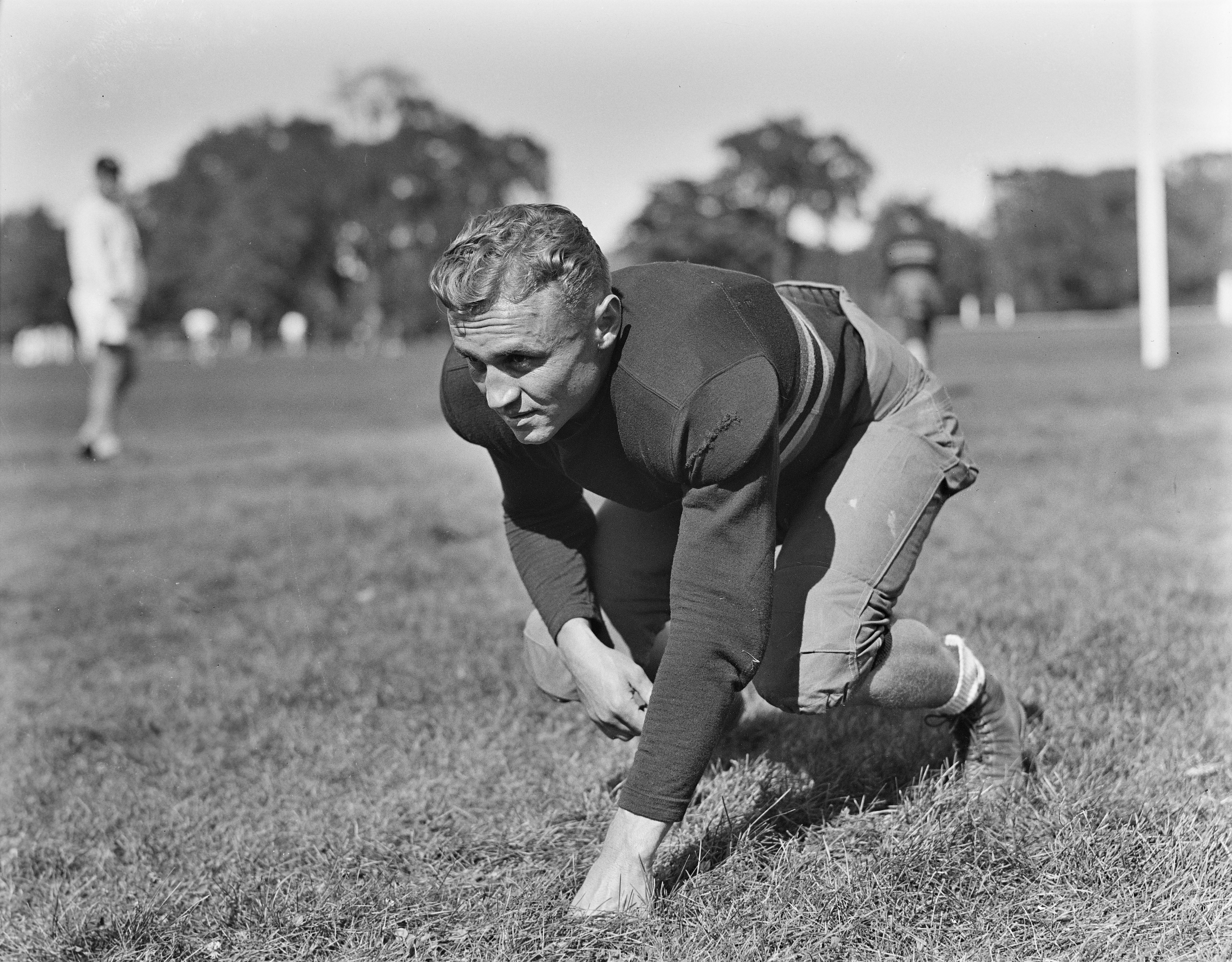
Fields playing football at West Point

Fields secured an appointment to the United States Military Academy at West Point, New York, from Andrew J. Hickey of Indiana's 13th congressional district, and entered West Point on 1 July 1929. At West Point he played varsity baseball, winning two major letters, and college football, distinguishing himself as a kicker and winning three football A's. In his final year the West Point football team lost only two games, and it defeated the arch-rival Navy team in all three years that he played on the team. He was First Captain and graduated first in the class of 1933. He won seven awards, including the Knox Trophy for the cadet with the highest rating for military efficiency. He married Frederica Hastings in April 1934. They had two sons and a daughter.

== Between the wars ==
Upon graduation, Fields, like most of the top-ranking cadets in his class, was commissioned as a second lieutenant in the Corps of Engineers. His first posting was to the Corps's office in Jacksonville, Florida. He then served with the 3rd Engineer Battalion at Schofield Barracks in the Territory of Hawaii, where he was promoted to first lieutenant on 12 June 1936. He returned to the United States on 16 October 1936, and was assigned to the 2nd New York Engineer District until 24 August 1937. He was on the staff at West Point until 1 December 1937. He earned master's degrees in engineering from the Massachusetts Institute of Technology in 1938 and from Harvard University in 1939. He then became the director of the Waterways Experiment Station at Vicksburg, Mississippi.

== World War II ==
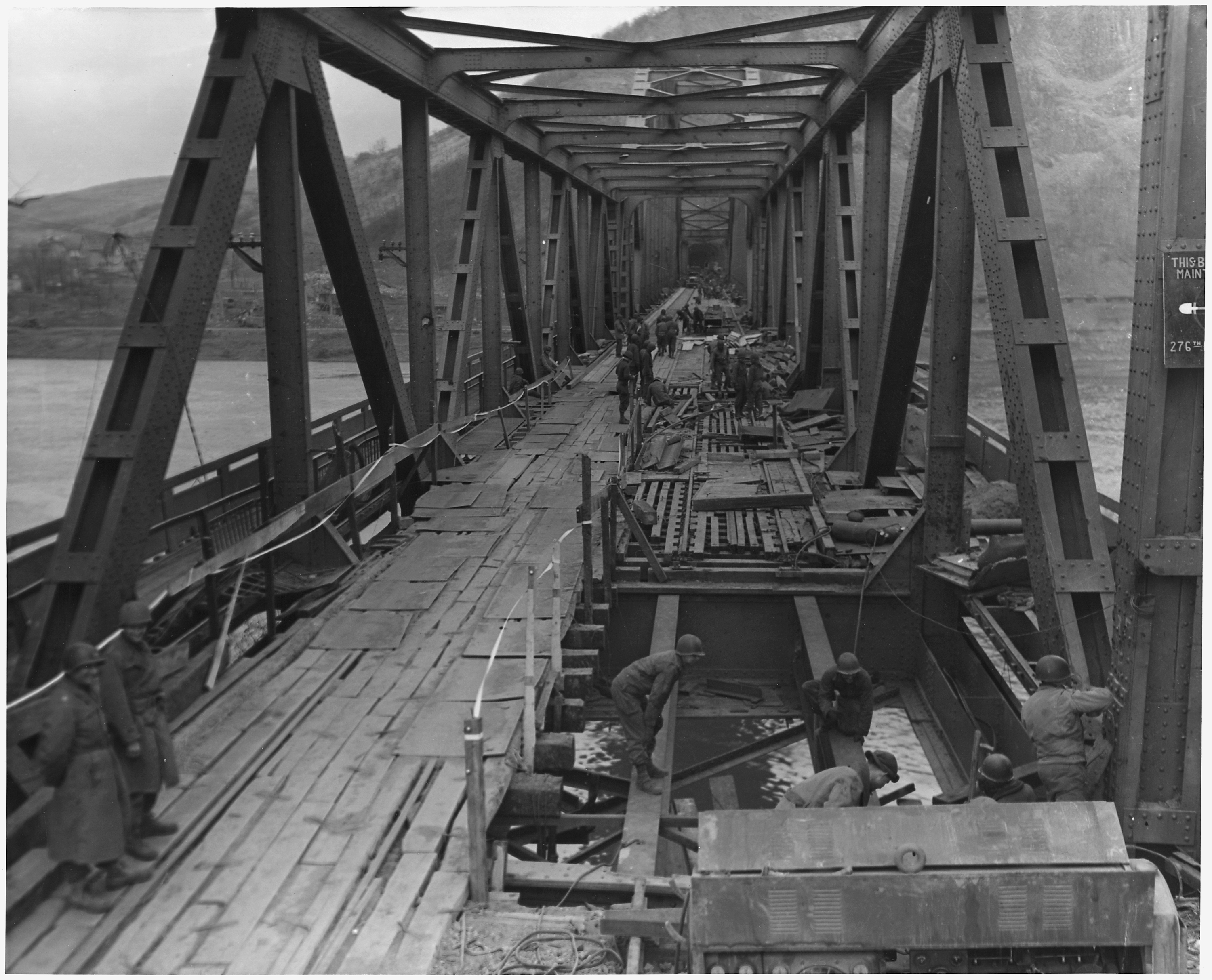
Engineers working on the Ludendorff Bridge at Remagen four hours before it collapsed

Fields was promoted to captain in the Army of the United States on 9 September 1940 and major on 1 February 1942. He was executive officer of the 25th Engineer Battalion at Camp Chaffee, Arkansas, from 15 April to 27 July 1942, and commanded the 56th Engineer Battalion at Camp Polk, Louisiana, from 14 August 1942 to 13 June 1943, with the rank of lieutenant colonel from 1 October 1942. He was an instructor at Fort Benning, Georgia, from 6 June 1943 to 19 June 1944. He commanded the 1169th Engineer Combat Group at Fort Rucker, Alabama, from 4 July 1944 to 18 January 1945, and then the 1159th Engineer Combat Group in Germany, with the rank of colonel from 29 March 1945.

As commander of the 1159th Engineer Combat Group, Fields was placed in charge of the recently captured Ludendorff Bridge at Remagen. The bridge was badly damaged from a failed demolition attempt but had enabled American forces to cross the Rhine. His group built a ponton bridge nearby, and labored to keep the bridge open to military traffic in the face of repeated German attempts to destroy it. Despite the efforts of the engineers to save it, the bridge collapsed after ten days of bombing and shelling, but by then several ponton bridges had been erected over the Rhine, and the Americans had established a 160 square kilometres (60 sq mi) bridgehead on the far side. For his part in the effort to save the bridge, Fields was awarded the Silver Star for gallantry. He was also awarded the Bronze Star Medal for his service as commander of the 1159th Combat Engineer Group.

On 21 June 1945, Fields became the director of the Army's athletic program in the European Theater of Operations.

== Post-war ==
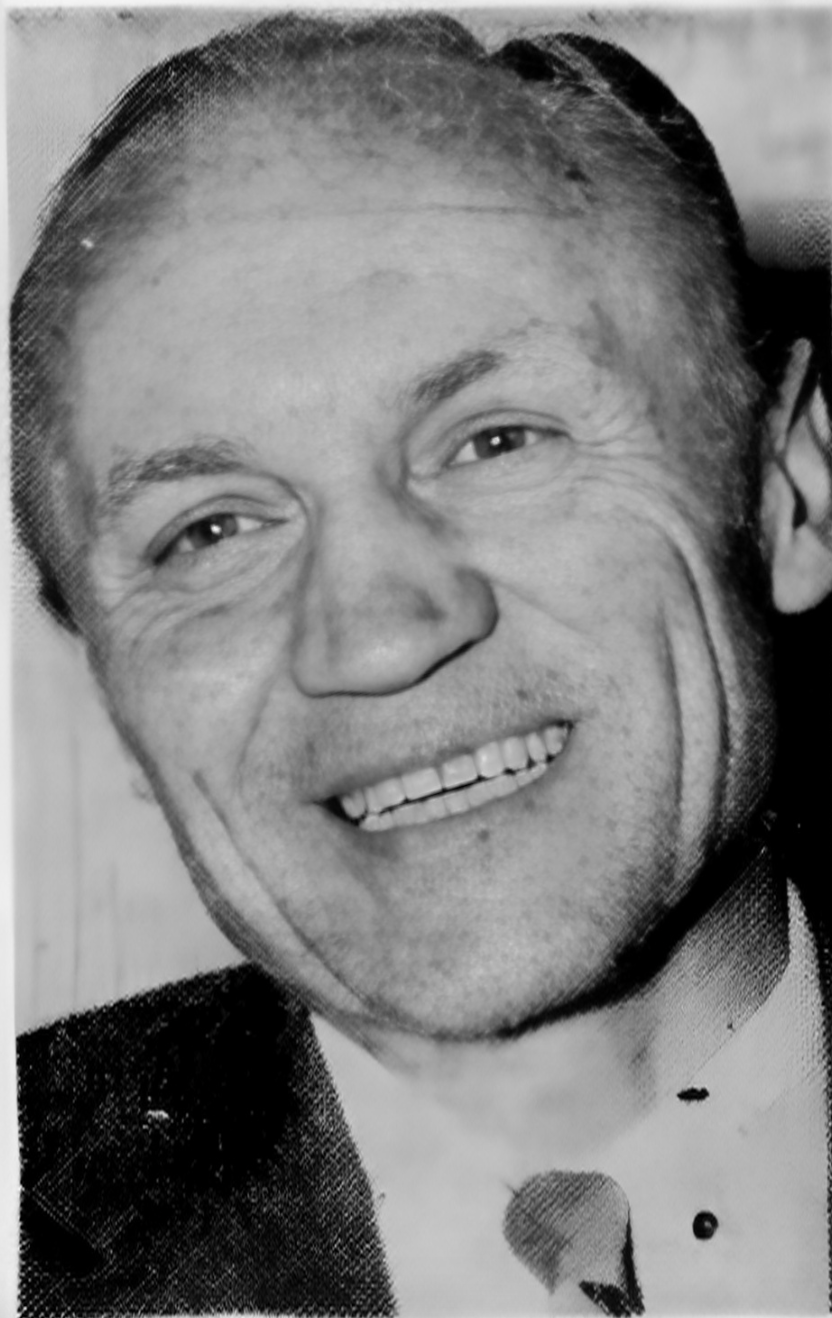
BG Kenneth E. Fields becomes general manager of the Atomic Energy Commission, 1955

Fields served as assistant to Major General Leslie R. Groves Jr., the director of the Manhattan Project, from 11 November 1945 to 10 April 1947. He then became the assistant to the Director of Military Applications of the Atomic Energy Commission (AEC). His commission as a colonel in the wartime Army of the United States was terminated on 30 June 1947, and he reverted to his substantive rank of captain, but he was promoted to major in the Corps of Engineers on 15 July 1948. On 6 August 1949, he became an instructor at the National War College. He headed the Military Assistance Program in Tehran, Iran, for which he was awarded the Iranian Military Order of Merit (2nd Class). He returned to the AEC on 20 August 1951 as the Director of Military Applications. For his service in this role, he was awarded the Army Distinguished Service Medal.

Fields retired from the Army in April 1955 to become the general manager of the commission, a civilian position, vice Kenneth Nichols. In this role he worked with Rear Admiral Hyman Rickover on the development of the nuclear submarine.

== Later life ==
After Fields left the AEC in 1958, he became executive vice president at International Standard Electric Corporation, a subsidiary of International Telephone and Telegraph (ITT), and the president of its ITT Europe subsidiary. Between 1961 and 1963, he was the executive vice president responsible for industrial and defense business at the Bulova Watch Company.

Fields died at the Homestead, a nursing home in Stamford, Connecticut, on 1 July 1996.

== Dates of rank ==
Insignia	Rank	Component	Date	Reference
	Second Lieutenant	Corps of Engineers	13 June 1933	
	First Lieutenant	Corps of Engineers	12 June 1936	
	Captain	Army of the United States	9 September 1940	
	Major	Army of the United States	1 February 1942	
	Lieutenant Colonel	Army of the United States	1 October 1942	
	Captain	Corps of Engineers	12 June 1943	
	Colonel	Army of the United States	29 March 1945	
	Captain (reverted)	Corps of Engineers	30 June 1947	
	Major	Corps of Engineers	15 July 1948.	
	Lieutenant Colonel	Corps of Engineers		
	Colonel	Corps of Engineers		
	Brigadier general	Regular Army	1952	
	Brigadier general	Retired	1955	
