= James E. Briggs =

United States Air Force general (1906–1979)

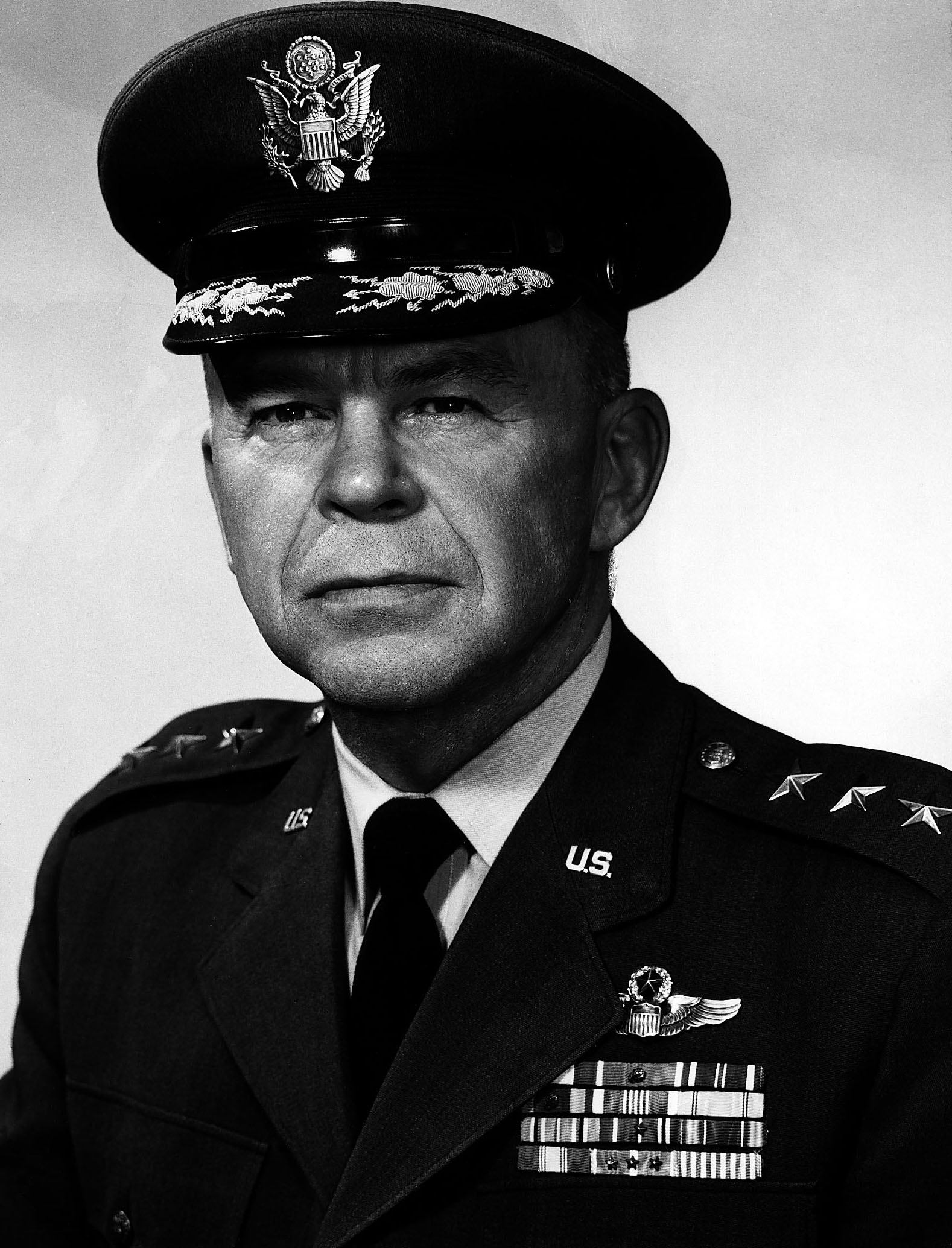
- Lieutenant General James Elbert Briggs
- Born: May 5, 1906; Rochester, New York, U.S.
- Died: February 25, 1979 (aged 72); Albuquerque, New Mexico, U.S.
- Military career
- Allegiance: United States of America
- Branch: United States Air Force
- Service years: 1928–1963
- Rank: Lieutenant General
- Nickname: Buster
- Commands: Superintendent, U.S. Air Force Academy; Air Training Command
- Conflicts: World War II; Korean War
- Awards: Distinguished Service Medal; Legion of Merit (2); Distinguished Flying Cross; Air Medal (2)

Lieutenant General James Elbert Briggs (May 5, 1906 – February 25, 1979) was a United States Air Force general who was the second Superintendent of the United States Air Force Academy.

== Biography ==
=== Early years ===
At West Point in 1928

He was born in Rochester, New York, in 1906, the son of Benjamin Robert and Marion Cypert Briggs. He entered the New York Military Academy in 1920 and, as an honor graduate, in 1924 received a presidential appointment to the United States Military Academy at West Point. He was "cadet first captain" (regimental commander) in his last year at West Point, graduated 31st in a class of 261 in 1928, and was awarded the Knox Trophy. He was commissioned a second lieutenant of Field Artillery.

=== Military career ===
Second Lieutenant Briggs' first assignment was to the Sixth Field Artillery Regiment at Fort Hoyle, Maryland. After spending nine months at there, he entered Primary Flying School and, in 1930, received his pilot's wings upon graduation from the Advanced Flying School at Kelly Field, Texas. Briggs was rated a command pilot.

After his transfer to the U.S. Air Corps in 1930, Lieutenant Briggs joined the 95th Pursuit Squadron at Rockwell Field near Coronado, California. He stayed with the 95th through its move in 1931 to March Field, California, and until he received orders in 1934 to attend the 10-month course at the Air Corps Technical School, Chanute Field, Illinois.

He spent the period from August 1935 to August 1937 in Hawaii with the 18th Composite Group and as commander of the 19th Pursuit Squadron at Wheeler Field on the Island of Oahu. After serving next in several command and staff positions with the 1st Pursuit Group, Selfridge Field, Michigan, and graduating from the Air Corps Tactical School in 1939, in 1940 Captain Briggs reported to the U.S. Military Academy where he spent the next two years as a member of the faculty in the Department of Mathematics.

In May 1942, the then Colonel Briggs was appointed operations officer of the Eighth Air Force Fighter Command in Europe and in September 1943 became air officer of the European Section of the War Department General Staff.

Briggs became deputy commander of the North Atlantic Divisions Air Transport Command in March 1945 and, in December that year, went to Air Transport Command headquarters as assistant chief of staff for plans and chief of organizational planning. In April 1946, he became a member of the Central Intelligence Group in Washington, D.C.

Moving to Colorado Springs, Colorado, in August 1947, he became chief of staff for the Fifteenth Air Force and, in April 1948, went to Spokane Air Force Base, Washington, to assume command of the 92nd and 98th Bombardment wings. After promotion to brigadier general in December 1948, he moved to MacDill Air Force Base in Florida in March 1949 and became commander of the 306th and 307th Bombardment wings.

Following the outbreak of the Korean War, Briggs was assigned in August 1950 as deputy commander of the Far East Air Forces Bomber Command, based on Okinawa and later in Japan. In January 1951, he assumed command of the Far East Air Forces Bomber Command. In July 1951, he was awarded the Air Force Distinguished Service Medal after completion of his tour as commander.

Briggs returned to the United States in June 1951 to become deputy commander of the Fifteenth Air Force at March Air Force Base, California. He was promoted to the rank of major general in October 1951 while at March Air Force Base and, one month later, was reassigned to Washington, D.C. as assistant deputy chief of staff for Development, Headquarters, U.S. Air Force. In May 1954, he was named assistant deputy chief of staff for operations and was given the additional duty of U.S. Air Force Member of the Permanent Joint Board on Defense, Canada-United States. During this period, Briggs was also Headquarters, U.S. Air Force project officer for the Distant Early Warning Line in Canada and for the U.S. Air Force Base Construction and Activation Program in Spain.

Briggs became the second superintendent of the U.S. Air Force Academy on August 1, 1956, when he succeeded Lieutenant General Hubert R. Harmon. He guided the operation of the new academy during two of its three years at the interim site on Lowry Air Force Base, near Denver, Colorado, and the move in August 1958 to the permanent home of the academy north of Colorado Springs Colorado.

On August 1, 1959, he assumed command of the Air Training Command, Randolph Air Force Base, Texas, at which time he was promoted to lieutenant general. Briggs retired from the Air Force on August 1, 1963.

In addition to the Air Force Distinguished Service Medal, Briggs' decorations included the Legion of Merit with oak leaf cluster, the Distinguished Flying Cross and the Air Medal with oak leaf cluster.

Briggs was a member of Rotary International, the Order of Daedalians, the San Antonio Chamber of Commerce, vice chairman for the campaign committee of the Texas United Fund and a member of the board of directors for the Air Force Academy Foundation. On November 23, 1958, he appeared as a guest on the panel game show What's My Line?.

Briggs died on February 25, 1979 in Albuquerque, New Mexico. He was interred at the United States Air Force Academy Cemetery on March 2, 1979.

Preceded by Hubert R. Harmon	Superintendent of the U.S. Air Force Academy; 1956—1959	Succeeded by William S. Stone
