= Ben Harrell =

United States Army general (1911–1981)

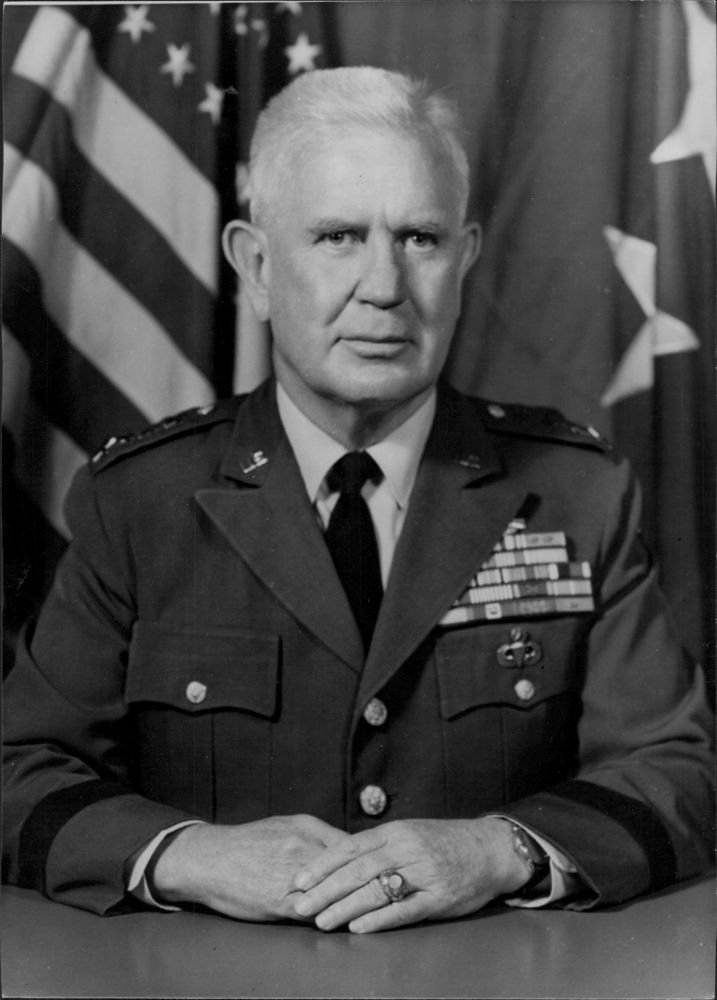
- Harrell in c. 1968
- Born: 15 March 1911; Medford, Oregon
- Died: 26 July 1981 (aged 70); Monterey, California
- Military career
- Allegiance: United States
- Branch: United States Army
- Service years: 1933–1971
- Rank: General
- Commands: Allied Land Forces South East Europe; Sixth United States Army; 101st Airborne Division; 7th Infantry Regiment
- Conflicts: World War II
- Awards: Distinguished Service Medal (2); Silver Star Medal; Legion of Merit (3); Bronze Star Medal (2)

Ben Harrell (15 March 1911 – 26 July 1981) was a United States Army four star general who served as Commander of Allied Land Forces South East Europe from 1968 to 1971. A class 1933 graduate of the United States Military Academy, Harrell played a pivotal role in planning and executing key amphibious operations in North Africa, Sicily, and Southern France during World War II. He also served as the Commander of the Sixth United States Army and the 101st Airborne Division, and as a member of the Howze Board.

== Early career ==
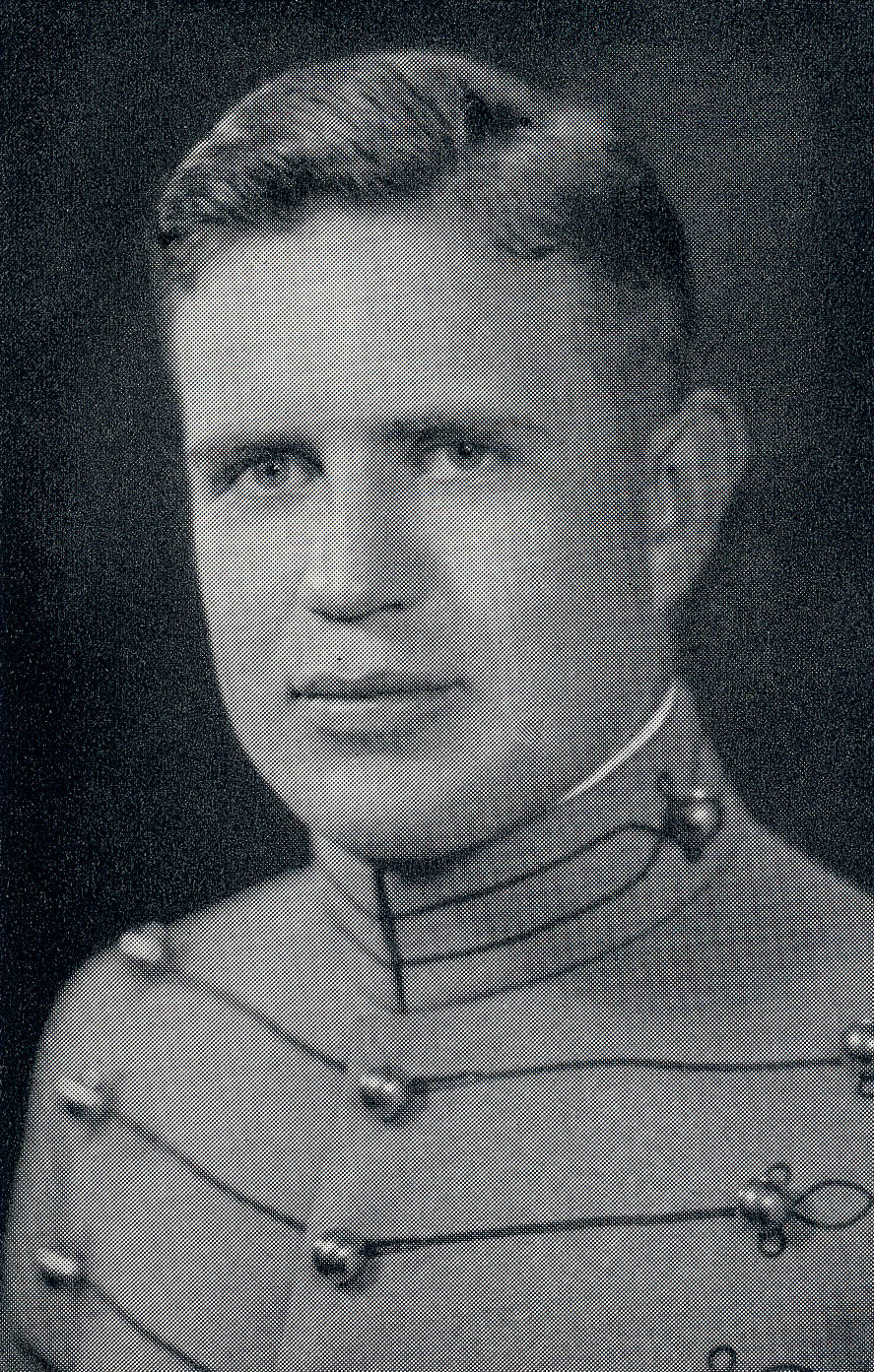
Harrell as a United States Military Academy cadet c. 1933

Ben Harrell was born on March 15, 1911, in Medford, Oregon. He was appointed to the United States Military Academy by Representative Hawley of Oregon and graduated on June 13, 1933. Upon graduation, he was commissioned as a Second Lieutenant in the U.S. Army.

== World War II ==
=== Pre–World War II Service ===
During his early military career, Harrell served in several key assignments. As a junior officer, he was stationed at Pearl Harbor, Hawaii, prior to the Japanese attack on December 7, 1941. He served with the 3rd Infantry Division as the S-3 (operations officer) of the 7th Infantry Regiment—a unit he would later command—and also led the 15th Regiment of the division. Harrell subsequently served as the Deputy Chief of Staff for Operations (G-3) in VI Corps and later as the Deputy Chief of Staff for Operations (G-3) of the Fifth U.S. Army in the Mediterranean Theatre.

=== World War II ===
Following the American entry into World War II, Harrell became deeply involved in strategic planning and combat operations:

- North Africa and Sicily: Harrell was instrumental in drawing up tactical plans for the Allied amphibious landings in North Africa in November 1942. He also played a key role in preparing for the landings in Sicily (Operation Husky) in July 1943, which involved mounting an invasion convoy of more than 1,000 ships—the largest such convoy in the world at that time. Harrell would work with his 1933 USMA classmate Col. William O. Darby whose Rangers would be the first units to invade in both North Africa and Sicily.
- Italy: After the Sicily landings, Harrell took part in the advance through Italy. He served temporarily as chief of staff of the 3rd Infantry Division before becoming the head of the G-3 staff department for VI Corps.
- Southern France and the Capture of Strasbourg: In August 1944, Harrell was among the troops that landed in Southern France to open a new front against the enemy. Shortly thereafter, he was given command of the 7th Infantry Regiment. Under his leadership, his unit advanced through the theater of operations, reaching Strasbourg and the German border by the end of 1944.
- Return to Italy: Following his success in Southern France, Harrell was transferred back to Italy, where he headed the G-3 staff department of the 5th Army until the conclusion of the war.

== Post–World War II and Cold War service ==
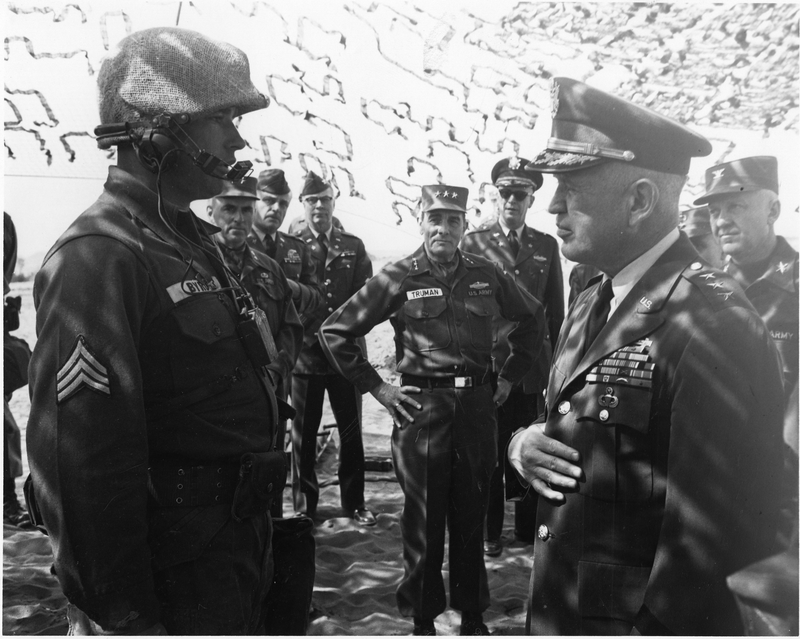
Lieutenant General Ben Harrell (right), Assistant Chief of Staff for Force Development, speak with Sergeant Ernest L. Byrd (left), Chief of the 3rd Gunnery Section, C. Battery, 6th Battalion, 10th Artillery during the General's visit to VII Corps, Kelley Barracks Stutt-Moehringen, Germany. Lieutenant General Louis W. Truman stands in center, rear. (Louis W. Truman Papers, Harry S. Truman Library & Museum)

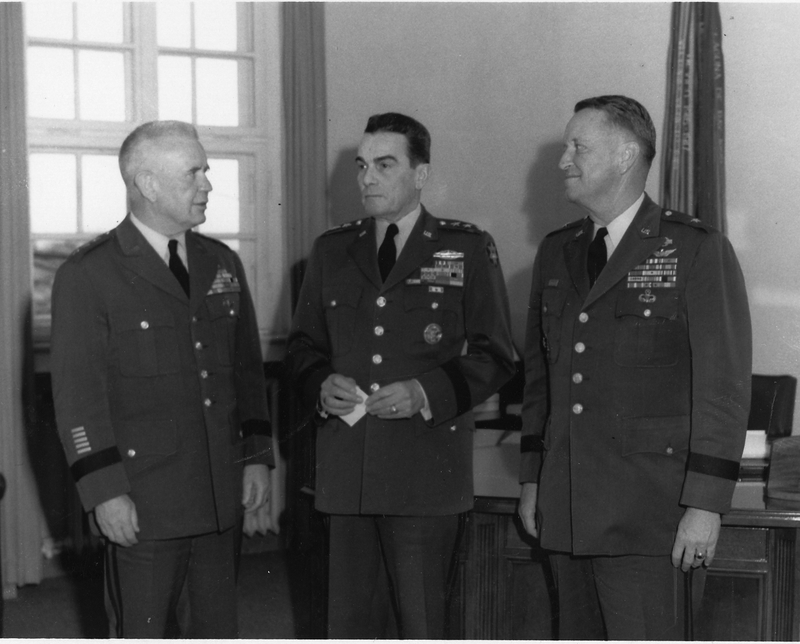
Lieutenant General Ben Harrell (left), Assistant Chief of Staff of Force Development is pictured with Lieutenant General Louis W. Truman (center), Commander VII Corps, and Brigadier General John J. Tolson III, Director of Army Aviation (right). General Harrell was visiting elements of the VII Corps Artillery, the 2nd Armored Cavalry and the 4th Armored and 24th Infantry Divisions. (Louis W. Truman Papers, Harry S. Truman Library & Museum)

In December 1945, after the end of World War II, Harrell returned to the United States and joined the staff of the U.S. Army Infantry School at Fort Benning, Georgia. His subsequent assignments included:

- Airborne Operations: Harrell headed the G-3 staff section of the 11th Airborne Division, was given command of the 511th Airborne Regiment, and eventually became chief of staff of the division in 1950. At the age of 37, he earned his Parachutist Badge.
- European Assignments: After studying at the National War College, Harrell served as a staff officer at the Supreme Headquarters Allied Powers Europe (SHAPE) near Paris. He was later transferred to Berlin, where in August 1953 he took command of the 6th Infantry Regiment. In the following year, he became chief of staff of the Berlin Brigade (served as Chief of Staff for the U.S. Commander in Berlin).
- Pentagon and Promotions: Harrell was assigned to the Pentagon in August 1955, where he served as the Executive Officer for the Assistant Secretary of the Army (Manpower and Reserve Forces). In January 1956, he was appointed to head the Infantry Branch, Career Management Division in the Office of The Adjutant General, and he was promoted to Brigadier General early in 1956.
- Service in South Korea: In July 1958, Harrell was transferred to South Korea, where he commanded the 7th Infantry Brigade and served as a member of the staff of the 7th Infantry Division.
- U.S. Continental Army Command and the 101st Airborne Division: On August 1, 1959, he was promoted to Major General and subsequently joined the staff of the U.S. Continental Army Command at Fort Monroe, Virginia. Between June 1960 and July 1961, Harrell commanded the 101st Airborne Division at Fort Campbell, Kentucky, succeeding William Westmoreland. He then returned to Fort Benning to serve as Commanding General of the Infantry Center and Commandant of the U.S. Army Infantry School.
- Later Pentagon Assignments and Further Promotions: In February 1963, Harrell resumed duty at the Pentagon as a staff officer and was promoted to Lieutenant General. From May 1965 to July 1967, he commanded the U.S. Army Combat Developments Command at Fort Belvoir, Virginia.
- Sixth Army and Allied Command: On July 6, 1967, Harrell assumed command of the Sixth United States Army, headquartered at the Presidio in San Francisco, California, a post he held through 1968. Following his promotion to four-star general in 1968, he took command of Allied Land Forces South East Europe, based in Verona, Italy, and held that position until his retirement in 1971.

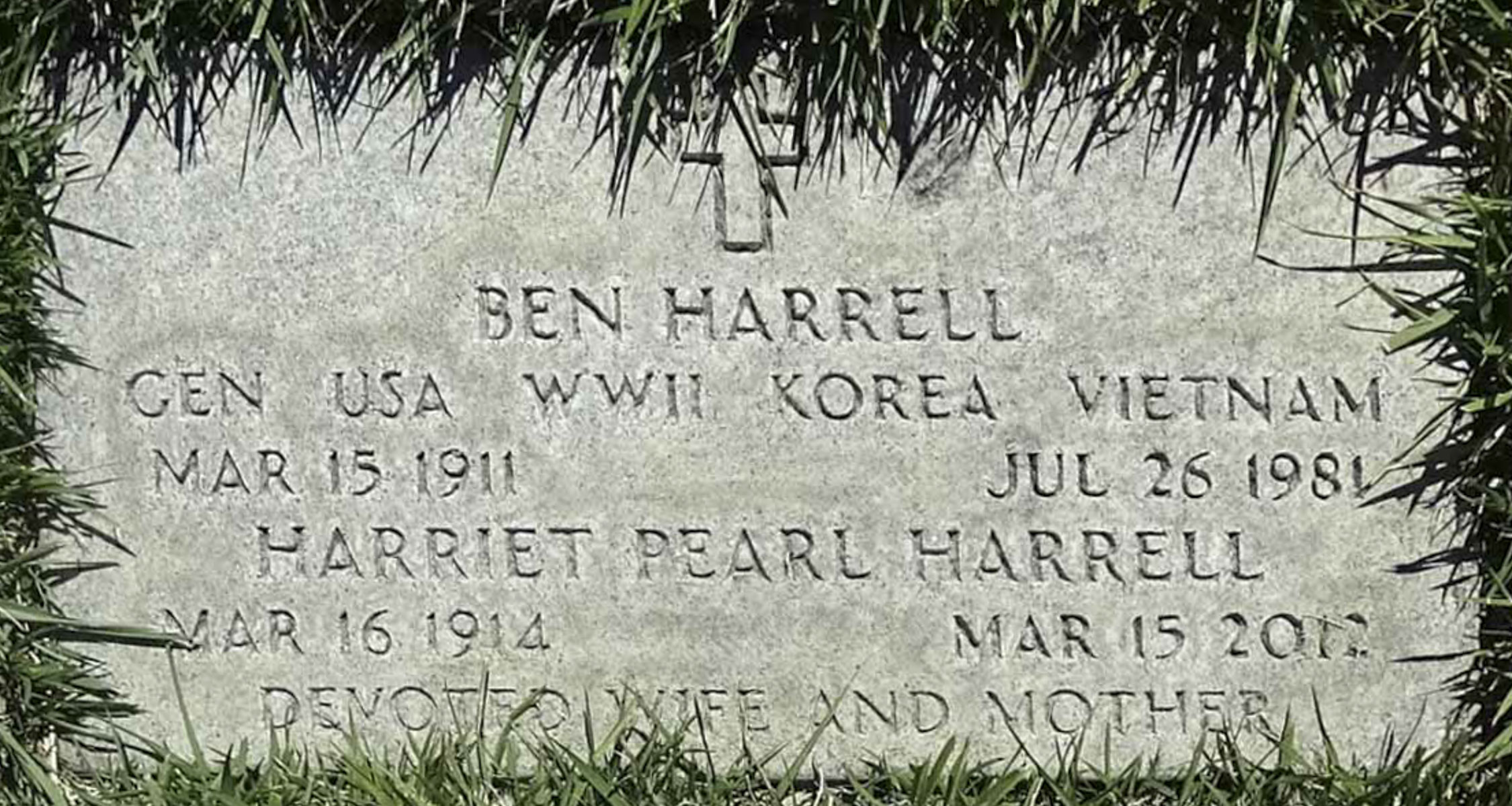
Grave of Gen. Ben Harrell and his wife Harriet Pearl.

He died in 1981 and was interred at San Francisco National Cemetery.

== Medals and Awards ==
During his military career, Ben Harrell received the following awards:

- Distinguished Service Medal (1 Oak Leaf Cluster)
- Silver Star
- Legion of Merit (2 Oak Leaf Clusters)
- Bronze Star Medal (1 Oak Leaf Cluster)
- Army Commendation Medal
- American Defense Service Medal
- American Campaign Medal
- European-African-Middle Eastern Campaign Medal
- World War II Victory Medal
- Army of Occupation Medal
- National Defense Service Medal with 1 Bronze Service Star
- Brazilian Medal of Honor (Brazil)
- Order of the British Empire (Great Britain)
- Czechoslovak War Cross (Czechoslovakia)
- Croix de Guerre (France)
- Italian Order of the Crown (Italy)
- Combat Infantryman Badge
- Master Parachutist Badge

== See also ==
- List of United States Army four-star generals
