= Knox Trophy =

The Knox Trophy, made in 1910 by Tiffany & Company for the Sons of the Revolution in the State of New York to present to the US Army United States Military Academy's top cadet.

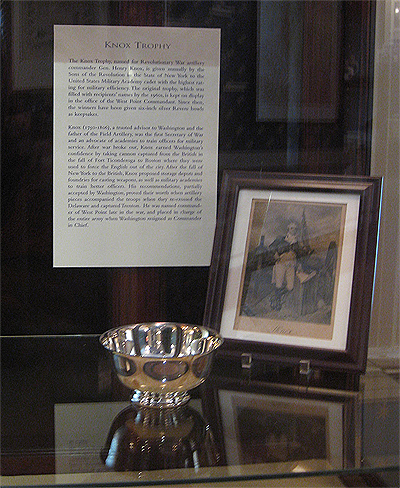
The Knox Trophy's Tiffany & Company cadet keepsake Revere bowl on display at Fraunces Tavern and Museum in Manhattan, New York. The original Knox Trophy is kept at the USMA at West Point. The exhibit was created by past SRNY President, Dr. Laurence Simpson.

The Knox Trophy is the oldest military award of the United States Military Academy at West Point. The award was established on October 8, 1910, and is given annually by the Sons of the Revolution in the State of New York to the United States Military Academy cadet with the highest rating for military efficiency. Named in honor of General Henry Knox, the first Secretary of War, the original trophy, made by Tiffany & Company was originally kept on display in the office of the West Point Commandant.

The Knox Trophy celebrated its 100th anniversary in 2010.

== History ==
The trophy was named in honor of Henry Knox (The first US Secretary of War).

The United States Military Academy is apchool for the practical and theoretical training of cadets for the military service. Upon completing its course satisfactorily, cadets are eligible for promotion and commission as second lieutenants in any arm or corps of the Army the duties of which they have been judged competent to perform.

Sherman L. Fleek, Lt. Col. US Army (Ret) United States Military Academy Command Historian noted, “The cadets undergo months and months, years actually of leadership evaluations, testing, training, and so on, since the trophy winners seemed to be First Captains because the First Captain excelled in leadership.”

A record in 1909 found an order of general merit ranking that included an order of merit score in; Civil and Military Engineering, Law, Ordnance and Science of Gunnery, Drill Regulations, Practical Military Engineering, Conduct First Class, less demerits for the year, providing a General Merit Ranking (looking for confirmation that this is the same reference to "military efficiency rating").

In 1978, the Commandant requested the Knox Trophy be presented to the Brigade Executive Officer. There was no established award for that position at the time. But in 1979, the Knox Trophy was again awarded to the cadet with the highest military efficiency. An award was established in 1981 recognizing the Brigade Executive Officer.

== Activities ==
The Knox Trophy is awarded annually prior to commencement ceremonies each year at the USMA at West Point. The award is normally presented by the President or board member of the Sons of the Revolution of the State of New York. A photograph along the annual commencement publication is sent back to the SR Headquarters at the Fraunces Tavern and Museum in New York City. Since the early 1960s, each winner has received a keepsake Tiffany silver Revere bowl. A keepsake replica, alongside a print of General Henry Knox is on display at Fraunces Tavern in lower Manhattan (see image at the top of the piece).

== The Sons of the Revolution of the State of New York ==
According to the Sons of the Revolution in New York (SRNY), the trophy was designed by Tiffany & Company and is still presented annually to the Corps of Cadets of the United States Military Academy by the Sons of the Revolution (NY). The tradition started back on October 8, 1910, and continues today as the academy's oldest military award.

Sons of the Revolution (SR) should not be confused with Sons of the American Revolution (SAR), a separate group which was founded on April 30, 1889, at New York by New Jersey businessman William Osborn McDowell. He disagreed with the Sons of the Revolution requirement of the time that other state societies be subordinate to the New York society, and intended to include members by recognizing additional types of public service of a revolutionary ancestor beyond that which contributed directly to the Revolution.

== Fraunces Tavern ==
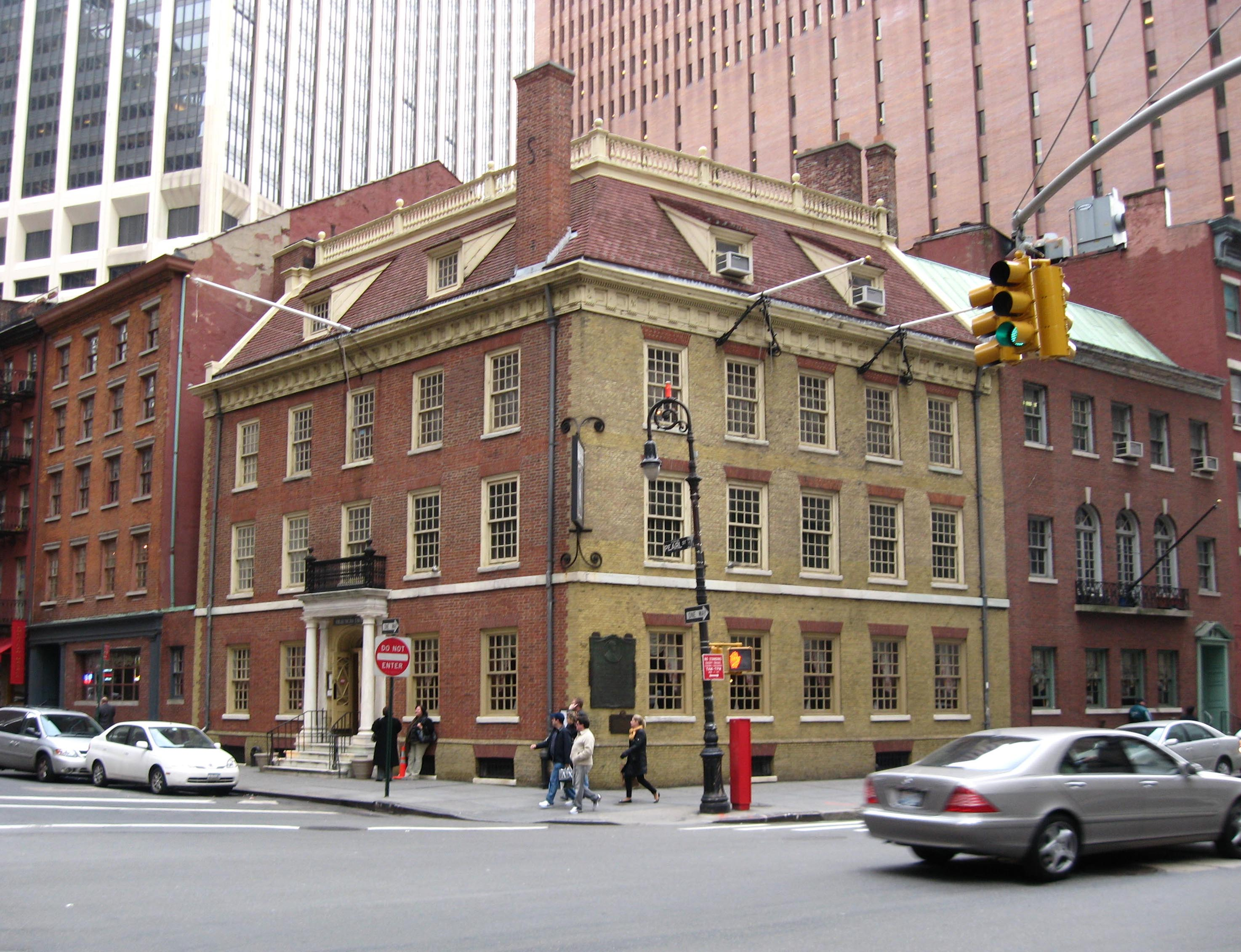
Fraunces Tavern at the southeast corner on Pearl Street at Broad Street at lower Manhattan in New York

Fraunces Tavern is a museum and restaurant housed in a restored building that played a prominent role in pre-Revolution and Revolution history. The building that houses the tavern, located at 54 Pearl Street at the corner of Broad Street, has been owned by the New York society since 1904, which claims it is Manhattan's oldest surviving building.

The building served also as the offices of the General Society until 2002, when the society headquarters moved to its current location in Independence, Mo. The museum maintains several galleries of art and artifacts about the Revolution including the McEntee "Sons of the Revolution" Gallery that displays much of the SR history.

=== Other Sons of the Revolution Military Awards ===
The General Society and several state societies have established various educational and military awards which are given to individuals and groups for their academic or service performance. The awards include the Annapolis Cup which was created in 1905 and given annually by the general society and the Maryland society to a U.S. Naval Academy midshipman, the Knox Trophy (New York) which was created in 1910 and given annually by the New York society to a U.S. Military Academy at West Point cadet, the Capt. Gustavus Conyngham Award which was created in 1999 and given annually by the New York society to a U.S. Merchant Marine Academy at Kings Point midshipman, the Recognition Award which was created in 2002 and given annually by the Massachusetts society to a U.S. Army ROTC cadet, and the Knox Trophy (From Massachusetts, not New York) which was created in 1924 and given annually until 1940 by the Massachusetts society to a U.S. Army field-artillery battery and "redleg" artillery operator.

== Knox Trophy Recipients ==
Most of the recipients were the First Captain of their graduating class, but it is not a requirement to win the award. On the list is some of the top U.S. Army officers; William Westmoreland, Pete Dawkins (1959 Heisman Trophy winner), and several others, including John P. McConnell who was later the US Air Force Chief of Staff. Four of the Knox trophy winners became four-star generals. As of 1987, three winners were stationed at West Point; the 1955 winner, Col. Lee D. Olvey, head of the Department of Social Sciences; the 1968 winner, LTC John L. Throckmorton, Jr., Treasurer of the USMA; 1969 winner, LTC Robert H. Baldwin, Jr., professor / Department of Social Sciences.

- 2010 – Nicholas Reisweber
- 2009 – Justin Wei Sen Lee (Singapore Armed Forces)
- 2008 – Jason Crabtree, First Captain USMA, Kingston, WA
- 2007 – Jonathan C. Nielsen, First Captain USMA
- 2006 – Peter J. Cacossa
- 2005 – James M. Edelen
- 2004 – Joseph Z. Wells
- 2003 – John R. Rhodes, Jr.
- 2002 – Andrew T. Blickhahn, First Captain USMA
- 2001 – Jonathan J. Hopkins
- 2000 – Scott Handler
- 1999 – Robert M. Shaw, First Captain USMA
- 1998 – Robert K. Bryant
- 1997 – Joseph M. Ewers
- 1996 – Scott M. Naumann
- 1995 – Hans J. Pung, First Captain USMA
- 1994 – Howard H. Hoege, First Captain USMA
- 1993 – Shawn Lance Daniel, First Captain USMA
- 1992 – Omar J. Jones IV, First Captain USMA
- 1991 – Douglas P. McCormick, First Captain USMA
- 1990 – Kristin M. Baker, First Captain USMA, first female Knox Trophy recipient, first female Brigade Commander
- 1989 – Mark M. Jennings, First Captain USMA
- 1988 – Gregory H. Louks, First Captain USMA
- 1987 – John Kai Tien, Jr., First Captain USMA
- 1986 – Timothy Alan Knight, First Captain USMA
- 1985 – Brian Lawrence Dosa, First Captain USMA
- 1984 – William Edward Rapp, First Captain USMA
- 1983 – Lawrence John Kinde, First Captain USMA
- 1982 – John William Nicholson, Jr., First Captain USMA
- 1981 – Stanley Raymond March, First Captain USMA
- 1980 – Vincent Keith Brooks, First Captain USMA
- 1979 – John Joseph Cook III, First Captain USMA
- 1978 – James Allen Hoffman II, First Captain USMA
- 1977 – Kenneth Franklin Miller, First Captain USMA
- 1976 – Richard Morales, Jr., First Captain USMA
- 1975 – James Kevin Abcouwer, First Captain USMA
- 1974 – Jack Edward Pattison, First Captain USMA
- 1973 – Joseph Phillips Tallman, First Captain USMA
- 1972 – Robert Lewis Van Antwerp, Jr., First Captain USMA
- 1971 – Thomas Alan Pyrz, First Captain USMA
- 1970 – John Thomas Connors, First Captain USMA
- 1969 – Robert Henry Baldwin, Jr., First Captain USMA
- 1968 – John Lathrop Throckmorton, Jr., First Captain USMA
- 1967 – Jack Bruce Wood, First Captain USMA
- 1966 – Norman Elliott Fretwell, First Captain USMA
- 1965 – Carl Robert Arvin, First Captain USMA
- 1964 – Richard Allen Chilcoat, First Captain USMA
- 1963 – Richard Everett Eckert, First Captain USMA
- 1962 – James Raiford Ellis, First Captain USMA, fellow graduate James Kimsey
- 1961 – Harold Michael Hannon, First Captain USMA
- 1960 – Charles Paddoc Otstott, First Captain USMA
- 1959 – Peter Miller Dawkins, First Captain USMA, Heisman Trophy winner, Brigadier General, CEO Primerica, Vice Chair CitiGroup Private Bank, Royal Oak, MI
- 1958 – Robert Francis Durkin, First Captain USMA, Major General, Director Defense Mapping Agency, Washington DC. Youngstown, OH
- 1957 – William Thomas Huckabee III, First Captain USMA
- 1956 – Robert Gordon Farris, First Captain USMA, fellow graduate H. Norman Schwarzkopf
- 1955 – Lee Donne Olvey, First Captain USMA
- 1954 – John Chapman Bard, First Captain USMA
- 1953 – Robert Erwin Barton, First Captain USMA
- 1952 – Gordon David Carpenter, First Captain USMA
- 1951 – William Joseph Ryan, First Captain USMA, fellow graduate Edwin E. "Buzz" Aldrin
- 1950 – John Michael Murphy, First Captain USMA, fellow graduate Frank Borman
- 1949 – Harry Agustus Griffith, First Captain USMA
- 1948 – Arnold Web Braswell, First Captain USMA
- 1947 – William Jackson Schuder, First Captain USMA, fellow graduate Alexander Haig
- 1946 – Amos Azariah Jordan, Jr., First Captain USMA
- 1945 – Robert Evans Woods, First Captain USMA
- 1944 – John Holloway Cushman, First Captain USMA
- 1943 – Jun - Bernard William Rogers, First Captain USMA
- 1943 – Jan - James Edward Kelleher, First Captain USMA
- 1942 – Carl Columbus Hinkle, Jr., First Captain USMA
- 1941 – John Norton, First Captain USMA
- 1940 – John Finzer Presnell, Jr., First Captain USMA
- 1939 – James Lewis Cantrell, First Captain USMA
- 1938 – Harold Killian Kelley, First Captain USMA
- 1937 – Stanley Lowell Smith, First Captain USMA
- 1936 – William Childs Westmoreland, First Captain USMA, WWII and Vietnam service, Time Magazines Man of Year 1965, Saxon, SC
- 1935 – Herbert Caran Gee, First Captain USMA
- 1934 – John de P.Townsend Hills, First Captain USMA
- 1933 – Kenneth E. Fields, First Captain USMA
- 1932 – John Paul McConnell, First Captain USMA, four-star General, US Air Force Chief of Staff, Booneville, AK
- 1931 – John Knight Waters, First Captain USMA, four star General, Commandant USMA 1946, son-in-law of GEN George Patton
- 1930 – Ralph Powell Swofford, Jr., First Captain USMA
- 1929 – Bruce Douglas Rindlaub, First Captain USMA
- 1928 – James Elbert Briggs, First Captain USMA, Rochester, NY
- 1927 – Charles Edward Martin, First Captain USMA
- 1926 – Raymond Coleman Maude, First Captain USMA
- 1925 – Charles Eskridge Saltzman, First Captain USMA
- 1924 – Robert Vernon Lee, First Captain USMA, SC
- 1923 – Hugh Wagner Downing
- 1922 – Charles Joseph Barrett, First Captain USMA
- 1921 – George Hamden Olmsted, First Captain USMA
- 1920 – Howard Louis Peckham, First Captain USMA
- 1919 – Hugh Ambrose Murrill
- 1918 – John Thornton Knight, Jr., First Captain USMA
- 1917 – Robert Marks Bathurst
- 1916 – Raymond George Moses, First Captain USMA
- 1915 – Roscoe Barnett Woodruff, First Captain USMA (also the class of Dwight David Eisenhower) 59 of the 164 graduates rose to become general officers
- 1914 – James Bell Cress, First Captain USMA
- 1913 – David Edward Cain, First Captain USMA, MO
- 1912 – William Dean, First Captain USMA
- 1911 – Benjamin Curtis Lockwook, Jr., First Captain USMA, Columbus Barracks, OH

== See also ==
- General Henry Knox, Secretary of War
- Sons of the American Revolution
- Daughters of the American Revolution
- Children of the American Revolution
- Society of the Cincinnati
