= Hubert R. Harmon =

US Air Force general (1892–1957)

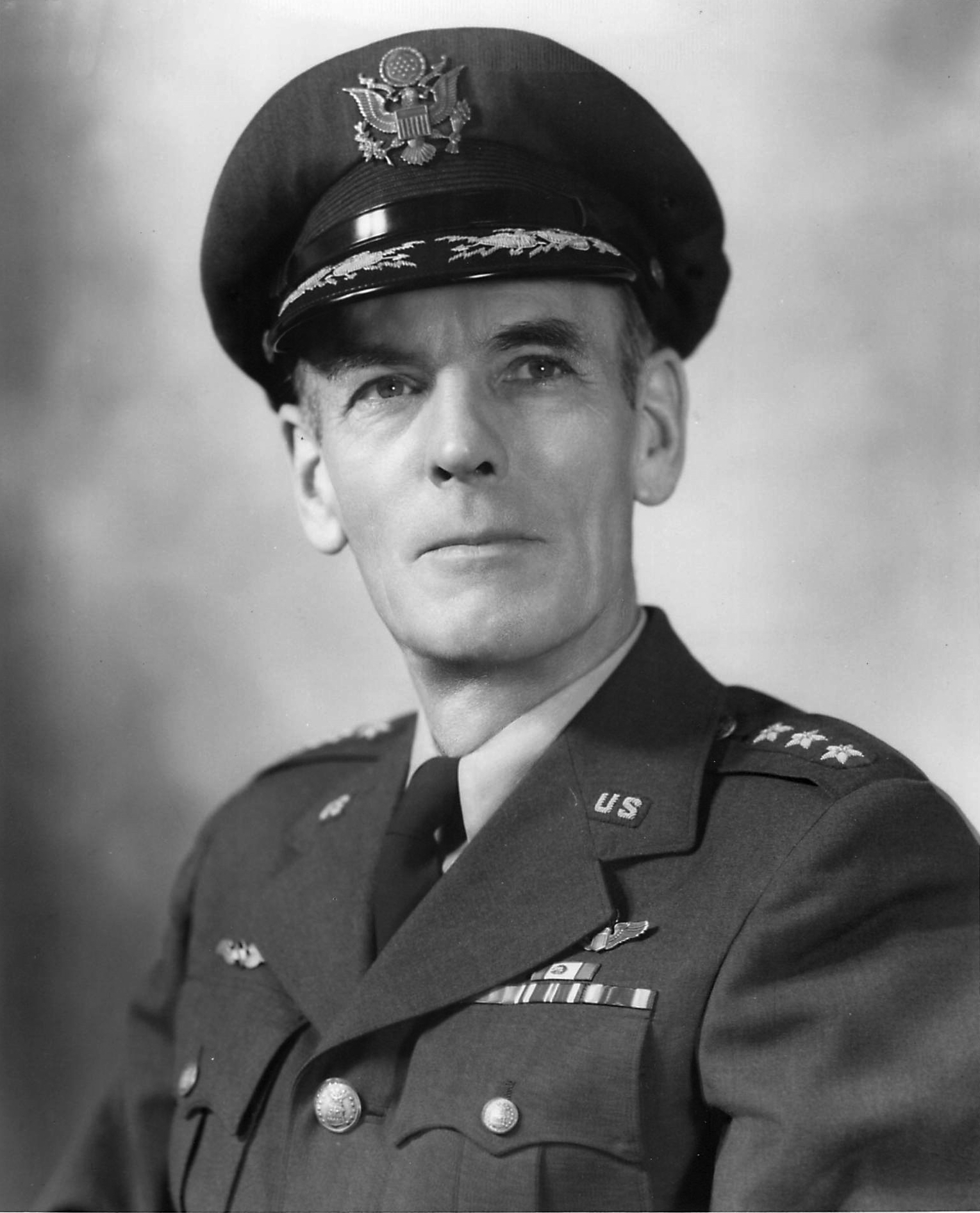
- Born: April 3, 1892; Chester, Pennsylvania, US
- Died: February 22, 1957 (aged 64); Lackland Air Force Base, Texas, US
- Burial place: United States Air Force Academy Cemetery
- Military career
- Allegiance: United States
- Branch: United States Air Force
- Service years: 1915–1956
- Rank: Lieutenant General
- Commands: 13th Air Force; Sixth Air Force; Superintendent, U.S. Air Force Academy
- Conflicts: World War I World War II; *Solomon Islands campaign
- Awards: Distinguished Service Medal; Legion of Merit; Distinguished Flying Cross; Air Medal

Lieutenant General Hubert Reilly Harmon (April 3, 1892 – February 22, 1957), after a distinguished combat career in World War II, was instrumental in developing plans for the establishment of the United States Air Force Academy. He was the first superintendent of the academy and was one of the persons most influential in establishing it as a successful educational institution.

== Early life and education ==
Hubert R. Harmon was born in 1892 at Chester, Pennsylvania. He was from a military family; his father Millard F. Harmon Sr. was a colonel who later served as Commandant of Cadets at the Pennsylvania Military Academy in Chester. One brother, Millard F. Harmon Jr. was a lieutenant general and another, Kenneth B. Harmon, a colonel.

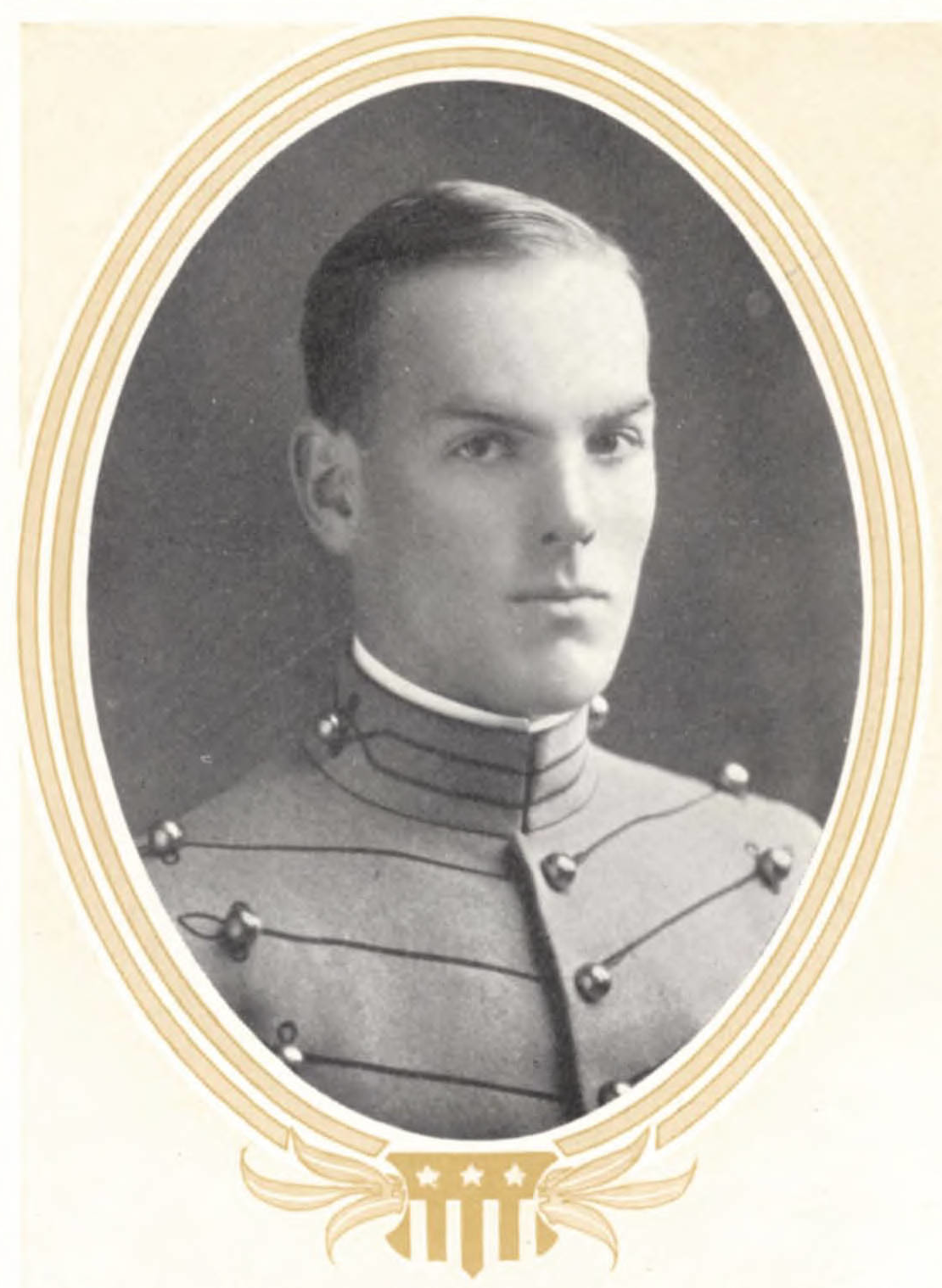
At West Point in 1915

Harmon attended the Polytechnic Preparatory School in Brooklyn, New York, for two years before entering the United States Military Academy at West Point. He graduated in 1915, as a member of "The class the stars fell on", named so due to the number of graduates who became generals.

== Military career ==
Harmon's first assignment was at Fort Monroe, Virginia, until December 1915, when he was transferred to Fort Andrews, Massachusetts. In 1917, he was assigned to Kelly Field, Texas, where he organized and served as commandant of the Ground Officer's Training School, and later as aeronautical officer for the Southern Department and engineer officer for Kelly Field. In March 1918, he was appointed executive officer at Taliaferra Field, Texas, and a month later was placed in charge of Barron Field, Texas.

In 1918, Harmon completed advanced training in pursuit aviation at Issoudun, France, and became chief of staff of the Air Service Command of the Third Army at Coblenz, Germany. On July 1, 1920, he transferred to the Air Service.

In October 1920, Harmon was assigned as assistant executive in the Office of the Chief of the Air Service at Washington, D.C., and served as an aide at the White House. In July 1924, he was transferred to Bolling Field, and then to McCook Field, Ohio, where he entered the Air Service Engineering School, from which he graduated in August 1925.

He returned to the Office of the Chief of the Air Service in 1926 as chief of the Information Division and again served as an aide at the White House. In 1927 he married Rosa Maye Kendrick, Wyoming Senator John B. Kendrick's daughter. From 1927 to 1929, Harmon served as military attache for aviation in London. He then was assigned as an instructor at the United States Military Academy. In 1933, he graduated from the Air Corps Tactical School at Maxwell Field, Alabama, and in 1935, he graduated from the Command and General Staff School at Fort Leavenworth, Kansas. In 1936, he was made commander of the 19th Bombardment Group. Harmon graduated from the Army War College in 1938, and was then assigned to the War Department General Staff as chief of the Operations Branch, Personnel Division.

In 1940, Harmon assumed command of the Advanced Flying School at Kelly Field, Texas, and one year later he was named commanding general of the Gulf Coast Air Corps Training Center at Randolph Field, Texas. In 1942, General Harmon was appointed commanding general of the Sixth Air Force and a month later was promoted to major general. He was promoted to lieutenant general on February 19, 1943. In 1943, he was appointed deputy commander for the air forces of the South Pacific Area and in January 1944 he assumed command of the 13th Air Force. In March to June, Harmon was commander of AirSols, all Allied air units in the Solomon Islands campaign. In June 1944, he was appointed commander of the Sixth Air Force, in the Caribbean.

In 1947, General Harmon was appointed senior Air Force member of the Military and Naval Staff Committee of the United Nations in New York City. The next year, he was given the additional duty of United States delegate to the Inter-American Defense Board, and in 1949 was made special assistant for air academy matters at Air Force headquarters in Washington, D.C.

General Harmon retired from active duty February 27, 1953, but was recalled to active duty the following day with the same duties. He reverted to retired status June 30, 1953, but was again called back to active duty as a lieutenant general November 8, 1953, at the request of the President of the United States, to become special assistant to the chief of staff for air academy matters. On August 14, 1954, General Harmon became the first superintendent of the United States Air Force Academy at its temporary home in Lowry Air Force Base, Colorado.

General Harmon reverted to retired status July 31, 1956, and died February 22, 1957, at Lackland Air Force Base, Texas.

== Awards and decorations ==
General Harmon's decorations and awards include the Distinguished Service Medal with two oak leaf clusters, the Legion of Merit, the Distinguished Flying Cross, the Air Medal, the Commendation Ribbon, the World War I Victory Medal, the Army of Occupation of Germany Medal (World War I), the American Defense Service Medal, the American Campaign Medal; the Asiatic-Pacific Campaign Medal with three service stars, the World War II Victory Medal, the National Defense Service Medal; the Panamanian Order of Balboa; Peruvian Military Order of Ayacacho, Grand Officer; Peruvian Aviation Cross, First Class; Ecuadorian Star of Adbon Calderon, First Class, and Commander Order of Leopold (Belgium) with Palm.

The main administration building at the United States Air Force Academy, Harmon Hall, is named in his honor.

In 2004, Dr. James G. Roche, the Secretary of the Air Force formally proclaimed Harmon "Father of the Air Force Academy".

Harmon is interred at the United States Air Force Academy Cemetery, and was the first person to be interred there.

== Effective dates of promotion ==
Insignia	Rank	Date
	Lieutenant general	February 19, 1948
	Major general	February 16, 1942
	Brigadier general	September 30, 1941
	Colonel	March 1, 1940
	Lieutenant colonel	October 1, 1936
	Major	June 17, 1918
	Captain	May 15, 1917
	First lieutenant	July 1, 1916
	Second lieutenant	June 12, 1915

Military offices
Preceded by none	Superintendent of the U.S. Air Force Academy; 1954—1956	Succeeded by James E. Briggs
