= Richard Mattern Montgomery =

United States Air Force general (1911–1987)

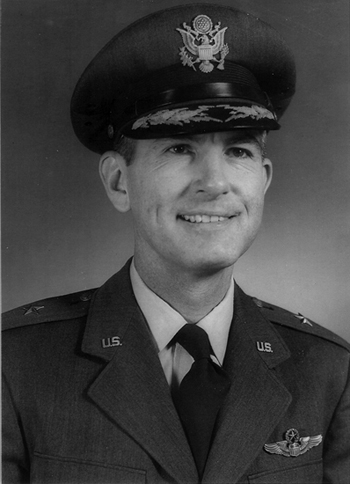
- Born: December 15, 1911; Hollidaysburg, Pennsylvania
- Died: 27 August 1987 (aged 75)
- Burial place: Arlington National Cemetery
- Military career
- Allegiance: United States
- Branch: United States Air Force
- Service years: 1933–1966
- Rank: Lieutenant General
- Commands: Vice Commander-in-Chief of the United States Air Force in Europe

Richard Mattern Montgomery (December 15, 1911 – August 27, 1987), was a lieutenant general in the United States Air Force, and chief-of-staff of the U. S. Strategic Air Command from 1952 to 1956. He was vice commander-in-chief of the United States Air Force in Europe, from 1962 until he retired in 1966. He was buried at Arlington National Cemetery, in Arlington, Virginia.

== Education and training ==
He attended the United States Military Academy at West Point, graduating in the class of 1933 with a lieutenant's commission. One year after graduation, he completed pilot training at Kelly Field, Texas. This was the beginning of an active flying career in which Montgomery logged more than 10,000 hours in more than 80 types of aircraft, including the KC-135 jet tanker (military counterpart of the Boeing 707), B-47 and B-52 intercontinental jet bombers.

== Military career ==
=== Vice commander in chief, U.S. Airforces in Europe ===
Sep.1962 – Sep. 1966
Montgomery was assigned as vice commander in chief, U.S. Air Forces in Europe, at Wiesbaden AB, Germany, September 1, 1962, with promotion to the grade of lieutenant general.

=== Vice chief of staff, Headquarters U.S. Air Force ===
Aug. 1959 – Sep. 1962
In August 1959 he was named assistant vice chief of staff, Headquarters U.S. Air Force. He served for two years in this capacity under his previous commander General Curtis E. LeMay, who was then vice chief of staff. At the end of his Pentagon tour he was presented with the Distinguished Service Medal by General LeMay, U.S. Air Force chief of staff. For the next year he continued in the same job when General Frederic H. Smith became vice chief of staff.

=== Deputy commander of the 2nd Air Force (SAC) ===
Sep. 1956 – Aug. 1959
In 1956 he was assigned as deputy commander of the 2d Air Force (SAC). Following this two-year tour, he became commander of the 3d Air Division at Guam, with responsibility for SAC Forces West of the 180th meridian.

=== Chief of staff to General Curtis E. LeMay ===
Sep. 1952 – Sep. 1956
The assignment which did most to shape his subsequent career was that of chief of staff, Headquarters, Strategic Air Command, Offutt Air Force Base, Nebraska, in September 1952, a post he held until September 1956. As a principal staff assistant to then SAC commander in chief General Curtis E. LeMay, Montgomery participated in the buildup of SAC into the most powerful military force in the world history.

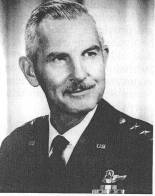
Later in his career

=== Joint Strategic Plans & Operations Group ===
1947–1949
A 1947 graduate of the Air War College, Montgomery became a member of the Joint Strategic Plans and Operations Group for General Douglas MacArthur in Tokyo. The following year he joined the 51st Fighter Wing at Naha Air Force Base, Okinawa. Flying then the new F-80 jet "Shooting Star" aircraft, the 51st Jet Fighter Wing pioneered in long overwater mass jet training flights in the Far East under Montgomery's leadership.

=== Deputy commander Briggs Air Force Base ===
1949–1952
Returning to the U.S. in 1949, he was assigned to Biggs Air Force Base in Texas and early in 1950 became deputy commander of the 97th Bombardment Wing located there. His assignment to SAC headquarters followed that tour of duty. A veteran of more than 30 years Air Force service, Montgomery was twice awarded the Legion of Merit while serving with the Strategic Air Command.

=== Aviation cadet training program/model basic flying school ===
1947–1949
Throughout his earlier years in the air corps, Montgomery held varied staff and command assignments. His first wartime job was concerned with organization of the aviation cadet training program. During this period he established a model Basic Flying School at Independence, Kansas. Later he was assigned to the Office of the Assistant Chief, Air Staff Training, Army Air Force headquarters in the Pentagon, where his extensive field experience was brought to bear on the entire Air Force wartime training program.

== Awards ==
- Legion of Merit (2)
- Army Distinguished Service Medal (1945)
- Air Force Distinguished Service Medal (1953, 1964)
