= List of United States Military Academy graduates from the class of 1933 =

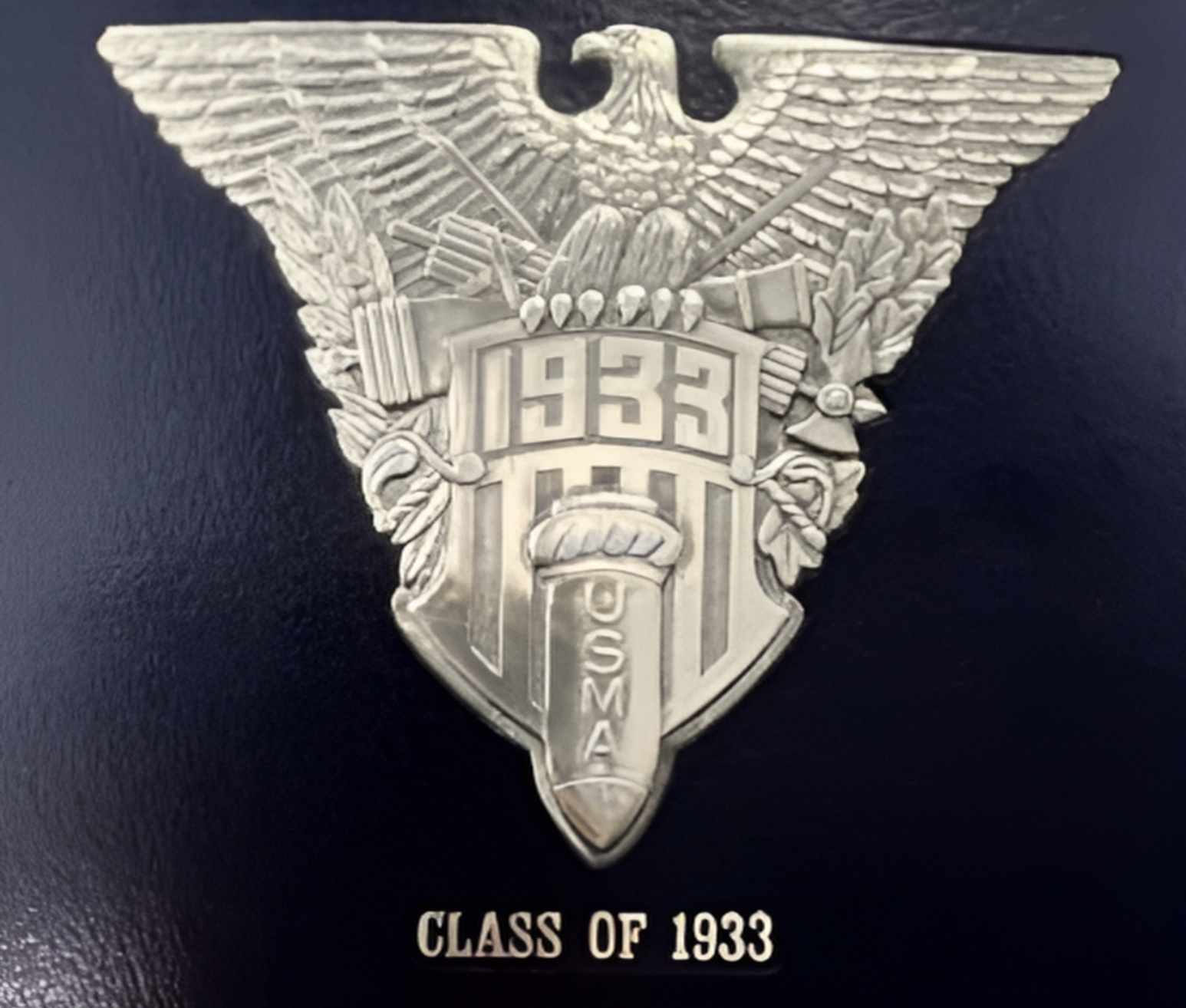
United States Military Academy Class of 1933

This article highlights graduates of the class of 1933. The United States Military Academy (USMA) at West Point, NY is an undergraduate institution dedicated to educating and commissioning officers for the United States Army.

The USMA Class of 1933 produced 347 graduates, making it the largest graduating class in the academy's history at the time. This number exceeded previous classes by an average of 50 to over 100 graduates, a record that remained unmatched until 1939, when the growing prospect of war led to an increase in commissioned officers.

Of the 347 graduates in 1933, 89 (26%) attained the rank of general. Five graduates reached the rank of four-star generals, 12 three-star lieutenant generals, 31 two-star major generals, and 41 one-star brigadier generals. 159 (46%) of the graduates reached the rank of colonel, 27 lieutenant colonel, 11 major and 2 captain.

The top 5 graduating cadets in 1933 were:

1. Kenneth E. Fields. 2. George Wood Beeler 3. John Joseph Danis 4. Duncan Hallock 5. Alfred Dodd Starbird.

== List of USMA class of 1933 four star generals (5) ==
Four Star Generals	USMA	Service	Branch	Highest command	Year Died	Class Rank
Gabriel P. Disosway			Air Force	Commander of the 37th Fighter Group Panama; Commander 312th Fighter Wing, China; Commander 12th Air Force & Tactical Air Command; Deputy chief of staff, operations, USAF	2001	200
Ben Harrell			Army	Deputy Chief of Staff Ops VI Corps & Fifth. Army; Worked on plans for Africa & Sicily invasions.; Commander 7th Infantry Reg. France; Commander Allied Land Forces Southern Europe	1981	323
James H. Polk			Army	Commander 3rd Mechanized Cavalry Group France "Task Force Polk"; Dir Policy Planning Staff Office Asst. Sec. of Def.; Commander United States Army Europe	1992	72
Theodore J. Conway			Army	9th Infantry Division, VI Corps, & Fifth Army. Africa, Italy, France; Commander U.S. Strike Command; U.S. Commander in Chief, Middle East, Africa	1990	59
Harold K. Johnson			Army	Japanese POW from 9 April 1942 to 7 Sept. 1945; Assistant Chief of Staff, G3 of I Corps. Korea; Chief of Staff of the United States Army	1983	232

== List of USMA class of 1933 three star lieutenant generals (12) ==
Three Star Lieutenant Generals	USMA	Service	Branch	Major Commands	Year Died	Class Rank
Alfred D. Starbird			Army Corps of Engineers	Commander 1135th Engr. Combat Group; Dir Military Appl Atomic Energy Commission; Sec. Defense Prog. Dep. of Energy	1983	5
Harold C. Donnelly; HAROLD COOPER DONNELLY			Air Force	Served in Panama CZ & Philippines.; Chief of staff India-Burma Theater.; Dir., Defense Atomic Support Agency	2002	84
Richard M. Montgomery			Air Force	Office Asst Chief, Air Staff Trng, Pentagon; Chief of staff Strategic Air Command; Vice Commander U.S. Air Forces in Europe	1987	336
William J. Ely			Army Corps of Engineers	Chief of Military Construction, Pacific.; Deputy Commander U.S. Army Materiel; Dep. Dir. Research & Engineering, DOD	2017	18
Thomas S. Moorman			Air Force	Chief climatologist, Air Corps Research; Director of weather for Ninth Air Force; Superintendent of the US Air Force Academy	1997	42
Edgar C. Doleman			Army	Commander 30th Inf. Reg., Italy France.; Assistant Chief of Staff for Intelligence; Chief of Staff Army in the Pacific	1997	175
Lawrence J. Lincoln			Army Corps of Engineers	Planning staff Admir.Mountbatten, Asia; Deputy Chief of Staff for logistics; Commander Fourth Army	2000	12
William W. Quinn			Army	Chief of Staff of the G-2, IV Army Corps.; Chief of Staff Pentagon; Dep. Dir. Defense Intelligence Agency; Commander 7th Army	2000	330
William O. Senter; WILLIAM OSCAR SENTER			Air Force	Commander Weather Wing, Philippines; Director, petroleum logistics policy, Office of the Assistant Secretary of Defense	2009	86
Jean E. Engler			Army	Commanding general US Army, Japan; Deputy commander US Army Vietnam; Deputy Chief of Staff for Logistics	1993	243
Oren E. Hurlbut			Army	Commander Ordnance Weapons Command.; Senior Army Rep., Defense Dep. Joint Chief of Staff.	2000	121
Richard D. Meyer			Army	Chief of Staff for Logistics	1998	7

== List of USMA class of 1933 two star major generals (31) ==
Two Star Major Generals	USMA	Service	Branch	Major Commands	Year Died	Class rank
William H. Baumer Jr.			Army	USMA as a history instructor; Staff of General Eisenhower, (OPD); Planned "Operation Bodyguard"; Joint Chiefs of Staff	1989	199
Walter A. Jensen			Army	Deputy Exercise Director, Operation Plumbbob; Commander, 14TH Corps, Vietnam	1989	50
John M. Breit			Air Force	Dir. plans Alaskan Air Command; Commander of the Dep of the Air Force Office of Special Investigations	1981	215
Chester A. Dahlen			Army	Commander 34th Infantry Reg, 24th Infantry Div, Pacific; Deputy Commander, Fourth Army	2006	64
George A. Carver			Army	Commander 542nd Field Artillery BN, 42nd Infantry Div., Patton's army.; Commander IV Corps, Army.	2003	166
Joseph E. Bastion Jr.			Army	Sec. to Eisenhower; Deputy Commander, V Corps, Europe; Commandant, the Armor School	2009	206
Ethan A. Chapman			Army	Chief of Staff US Forces in Japan	1988	120
Cyrus A. Dolph III			Army	Commander 102d Cavalry Group, 2d Inf. Div., France; Deputy Commander, US Forces, Vietnam	1985	214
Travis M. Hetherington			Air Force	Director of Radio and Radar Schools, Air Training Command; Chief of staff for operations, Fifth Air Force, Pacific; Deputy director of the NSA	2002	66
Roy T. Evans			Army Quartermaster Corps	Commandant of Quartermaster School; First Exec. Director for Logistics, Plans & Systems, Defense Supply Agcy	1976	184
Frederick W. Gibb			Army	Commander 16th Infantry Regiment Oran, Sicily, Normandy, Bulge; Commander of the 2nd Infantry Division	1968	267
Thomas B. Evans			Army Quartermaster Corps	G-4, Headquarters and Service Command, Far East Command	1997	218
Samuel E. Gee			Army	Commander 164th Infantry Reg, 23d Infantry Div., Philippines; Commander 16th Infantry	1998	298
Carl Darnell Jr.			Army	Army Air Defense Command Sentinel Missile System; Chief, Office Reserve Components, Department of the Army	1985	258
John T. Honeycutt			Army	Planning for Operation Torch Africa & Sicily; Operations Div., War Dep. General Staff, Pentagon; Asst. COS for Programs, SHAPE	1996	19
David P. Gibbs			Army Signal Corps	Commander 51st Signal Operations Battalion; Chief of Communications-Electronics, Dept. of the Army Staff	1987	234
David W. Gray			Army	Commander 27th Infantry Reg, 25th Infantry Div, Korea; Chief, Subsidiary Activities Div., J-5, Joint Staff, CIA Para-Military Plan, Cuba, DOD Rep to Kennedy	2002	32
William A. Harris			Army	Special Plans Branch, 12th US Army Group; Created the deception unit knows as the Ghost Army	1986	20
Francis J. McMorrow			Air Force	Ordnance Officer of the 7th Air Force; G4, Headquarters, U.S. Army Europe; 1st Commander, U.S. Army Missile Command	2007	39
John J. Lane			Army	Commander of Military Traffic Management and Terminal Service	1989	65
John G. Shinkle			Army Field Artillery	1st commander, Army Rocket & Guided Missile Agency; Director Apollo Manned Space Project NASA		23
Charles H. Pottenger			Air Force	Asst. COS for operations, Tactical Air Force, Italy; Commander, Air University, Maxwell Air Force Base	2004	338
Harold R. Maddux			Air Force	Commander 99th Pursuit Group; Commander Air Force in Pacific; Director Office of Manpower Req.	2002	130
Alvin C. Welling			Army Corps of Engineers	Built the Alcan Highway, Ledo Road; Engineer Comm'r of D.C.	2008	27
George T. Powers III			Army	Special Asst. to Joint Chiefs of Staff, for Arms Control; Commander 15th Army Corps	1983	181
Frederick R. Zierath			Army	Commander 1st BN, 19th Inf. Reg., Pacific; Commander, 15th Corps	1999	256
Karl Truesdell Jr.			Air Force	Commander 29th Bomb Sqn. PR; Command Foreign Wing, Air Trans., Pacific; Commander of 12th Air Force	1978	305
John F. Thorlin			Army Ordnance Corps	Ordnance Officer in Pacific theater; Called "Mr. Armed Forces Automotive"; 6/26/62 "Gen. Fred Thorlin Day." in Detroit.	2004	111
Herbert G. Sparrow			Army Field Artillery	Chief of staff, 98th Division in Japan; Army Gen. Staff DC; Commander 42nd Field Arty Grp. w/ 1st tactical nukes.	2006	47
William R. Calhoun			Army Field Artillery	Commander 50th Field Artillery BN.	2000	303
Charles H. Chase			Army	Exec. Off. 506th Parachute Inf. "FIVE O SINK" Normandy.; G2 of Eighth Army, Korea.; Chief, US Advisory Grp in Cambodia	1981	139
Richard J. Meyer			Army Signal Corps	Commander 57th Signal BN, Italy; 1st Commander of STRATCOM	1999	191

== List of USMA class of 1933 one star brigadier generals (41) ==
One Star Brigadier Generals	USMA	Service	Branch	Major Commands	Year Died	Class Rank
William O. Darby			Army	Founding commander 1st Ranger Battalion, US Army Rangers; 1st BN in Oran, Sicily, and Anzio invasions	1945	177
Milton F. Summerfelt			Air Force	Commander 333d Bomb Group, Pacific; Deputy chief of staff for ops, Atomic Energy Office; Joint Chiefs of Staff	1984	197
Kenneth E. Fields			Army Corps of Engineers	Commander 1159th Engr. Combat Grp. Europe; Asst. to Gen. Groves & Dir. of Military Applications of the AEC	1996	1
Thomas H. Beck			Army	G-3, 8th Infantry Div.	1984	208
Royal A. Reynolds Jr.			Army	Commander 1st BN Philippines; After defeat by Japanese he became a guerrilla fighter	203	284
Robert C. Tripp			Army Corps of Engineers	Transportation Officer, Third Army. PioneeredRed Ball Express to move supplies.; Commander, Army Terminal Command	2014	16
Sherburne Whipple Jr.			Army	Cmdr. 92nd Reconnaissance Squadron; American rep. on the Demilitarization Cmte. (DMZ) Korea	1998	174
Richard T. King Jr.			Air Force	44th Recon. Sqd. Panama; Chief of the Policy Division, Air Force	1995	277
Richard A. Risden			Army	G-1, Berlin Command; Commander, 17th Infantry Reg., Korea.	1998	325
William O. Blandford			Army	Commander of the 3d Battalion, WWII	1986	34
James L. Dalton II			Army	commander the 161st Inf. Luzon; asst. commander 25th Infantry Division; Killed by sniper. The pass was named after him. Dalton Pass	1945	144
Chester B. deGavre			Army	chief of staff, airborne invasion of southern France; Commander, 65th Inf. Reg. Korea	1993	309
Laurence B. Kelley			Air Force	25th Bomb Squadron, France Field, Panama; Commander 494th Bomb Group, “Kelly’s Kobras”Pacific; Director of logistics plans, Materiel	1979	152
Maddrey A. Solomon			Army Field Artillery	Commander 43rd Div. Artillery Germany; Chief of Staff 35th Infantry, EU; Joint Chief of Staff	1977	239
Sidney F. Giffin			Air Force	Chief of the Airdrome Defense Unit, Pacific; Vice commandant of the Air War College	1977	89
Paul T. Carroll			Army	Battalion Commander 2d Regiment, EU; Office of the Army Chief of Staff; White House Staff Sec. to Pres. Eisenhower	1954	190
Joseph B. Crawford			Army	Commander 2d Battalion, 18th Infantry Reg, 1st Infantry Div; Commander, 15th Infantry Regiment, 3d Infantry Division, EU	1987	260
Duncan Hallock			Army Corps of Engineers	company officer 11th Engineer Reg. Panama; Chief of the Research & Development Division; 8TH Army in Seoul	2013	4
Sydney D. Grubbs Jr.			Air Force	commander 80th Fighter Group, chief of staff North Burma Air Task Force; Inspector general (SAC) Strategic Air Command		318
Frederick O. Hartel			Army	Chief of Staff, SECOND Army; Commanding General, Berlin Brigade	2000	301
Frank S. Henry			Army	Headquarters of Gen. Douglas MacArthur; 1948 Summer Olympics gold medallist	1989	33
Franklin S. Henley			Air Force	Deputy commander 1st Base Air Depot area in direct support of the 9th Bomber Command, 9th Air Force. EU; Commander 1608th Air Transport Wing		213
Francis Hill			Army Field Artillery	Chief of Staff (G-3), US India-Burma; Commanding General Artillery, V Corps	1973	102
Stephen B. Mack			Air Force	90 combat missions over Italy during World War II, piloting A-36, P-40, and P-47 aircraft; chief of staff at Ninth Air Force	1976	286
William F. Ryan			Army	Director of Plans and Management, Office of the Chief of Research and Development; Head of the Test and Evaluation Agency.	1983	186
Joseph W. Stilwell Jr.			Army	15th Inf. Reg. China; Commander 23rd Inf. Reg. Korea; Commander US Army Support Group, Special Forces, Vietnam	1996	161
Robert M. Blanchard Jr.			Army	Commander Infantry Battalion of the 15th Infantry Regiment, 3d Infantry Division.; Commander 8th Cavalry Reg., Korea	1999	329
James O. Boswell			Army	G-2, 90th Infantry Division, EU; Commander, 7th Infantry Reg, 3d Infantry Division, Korea	1996	233
Charles R. Broshous			Army Corps of Engineers	Control Division of the Army Service Forces, European Theater	1984	21
Frederick W. Coleman III			Army	Task Force Coleman, consisted of the 2nd Battalion, 232nd Infantry, EU	1980	261
Charles G. Dunn			Army		1990	40
Morris O. Edwards			Army	commander infantry regiment WWII, served as Deputy Director of Wurtemburg-Baden in the Military reconstruction of Germany		85
Edward S. Ehlen			Army		1985	333
Graydon C. Essman			Army	G-3 (Operations Officer) for the SEVENTH U.S. Army Corps, EU	2003	288
Stephen O. Fuqua Jr.			Army	DIR. INTERNATIONAL SECURITY AGENCY NEAR EAST AND AFRICA REGION, AND ASSISTANCE SECRETARY Of STATE AMERICAN AFFAIRS	1990	153
Walter A. Huntsberry			Army		1967	245
Robert B. Neely			Army Field Artillery	Division Artillery, 34th Infantry Division	1998	158
Franklin G. Smith			Army	G-3, Sixth Army; Assistant Deputy Chief of Staff for Operations, J 3, NORAD, Ent AFB, Colorado	2001	198
Felix L. Vidal Jr.			Army		1983	254

== List of USMA class of 1933 colonels (159) ==
Colonels	USMA	Service	Branch	Major Commands	Year Died	Class Rank
NELSON PARKYN JACKSON			Air Force	Commander 327th Fighter Group and 64th Fighter Wing; Dep. Chief of Staff 15th Air Force; Ops. Officer Operation Fitzwilliams; NATO liaison JCS	1960	300
HARRY STEPHEN BISHOP			Air Force	U.S. Air Attaché to the Turkish Gov. Ankara; commander 2493rd Air Force Reserve, D.C.; Chief of Staff for 12th & 18th Air Force	1981	99
CHARLES WHEELER THAYER			Foreign Service	Office of Strategic Services (OSS); developed secret Office of Policy Coordination, later CIA; Ran Voice of America; Hoover of FBI investigated him.	1969	10
LAWRENCE KERMIT WHITE			Army	Wounded in Japan; Director, Foreign Broadcast Information Service; Exec. Director of the CIA	2006	287
CORDES FREDRICH TIEMANN			Air Force	Staff Weather Officer for 8th Bomber Command; Eisenhower's Staff, his weather model determined go or no-go for D-Day.	1992	238
RICHARD PARK JR.			Army Field Artillery	Asst. military attache, to Soviet Army; Asst. to Military Aide to President Roosevelt; Yalta Advisor; advisor to Truman; Helped form the CIA	1969	124
MARSHALL BONNER			Air Force	Commander, 464th Bombardment Group (Heavy), 15th Air Force; lost on a bombing mission over Vienna on 6/26/1944	1944	11
EDSON SCHULL			Army	1st Armored Div. in North Africa & Italy	2008	282
THOMAS BURNS HALL			Air Force	Commander 394th Bomb Group, 9th Air Force, Europe; Missing in action, Korea	1951	54
ROBIN BRUCE EPLER			Air Force	Deputy commander (Technical) of the Army Air Forces Proving Ground	1944	313
EMORY EDWIN HACKMAN			Army Field Artillery	Post war taught physics at Georgetown University	1998	107
DWIGHT DIVINE II			Air Force	Commander 22d Bombardment Group (H), consisting of one squadron of B-24s and three squadrons of B-25s based at Dobodura, New Guinea	1998	132
GEORGE WOOD BEELER			Army Corps of Engineers	Plans and Operations, Department of the Army, working on International Control of Atomic Energy	1951	2
JOHN J. DANIS			Army Corps of Engineers			3

- Col. RUSSELL F. AKERS, JR.
- Col. JOHN D. ARMITAGE
- Col. JOHN GLENN ARMSTRONG
- Col. EDWARD THORNDIKE ASHWORTH
- Col. WILLIAM GORDON BARTLETT
- Col. CHARLES PEARCE BELLICAN
- Col. LYLE W. BERNARD
- Col. GEORGE H. BISHOP, JR.
- Col. EDWARD BODEAU
- Col. CLAUDE LESLIE BOWEN, JR.
- Col. F. CLAY BRIDGEWATER
- Col. JOHN ROOSEVELT BRINDLEY
- Col. HARRY NELSON BURKHALTER, JR.
- Col. DOUGLAS MOORE CAIRNS
- Col. BERNARD CARD
- Col. EMMANUEL CEPEDA Y SALVADOR
- Col. GEORGE HOBART CHAPMAN, JR.
- Col. GERALD CHAPMAN
- Col. PETER DEMOSTHENES CLAINOS
- Col. ERNEST MIKELL CLARKE
- Col. JOHN ABELL CLEVELAND, JR.
- Col. AVERY JOHN COOPER, JR.
- Col. DABNEY RAY CORUM
- Col. JOSEPH L. COWHEY
- Col. DONALD CAMERON CUBBISON JR.
- Col. ARTHUR ROBERT CYR
- Col. WILLIAM FANT DAMON
- Col. WILLIAM JOSEPH DANIEL
- Col. DOUGLAS CHARLES DAVIS
- Col. HOY D. DAVIS
- Col. ALTON A. DENTON
- Col. ELLSWORTH B. DOWNING
- Col. WALTER A. DOWNING
- Col. WILLIAM FIELD DUE
- Col. CHARLES GOLDING DUNN
- Col. FRANK LAURENCE ELDER
- Col. ROLAND ARTHUR ELLIOTT
- Col. GORDON MILO EYLER
- Col. FREDERIC HENRY FAIRCHILD
- Col. JOHN WILLIAM FERRIS
- Col. RANDOLPH WHITING FLETTER
- Col. MARSHALL WOODRUFF FRAME
- Col. ROBERT BEALL FRANKLIN
- Col. WILLIAM YORK FRENTZEL
- Col. WILLIAM GEORGE FRITZ
- Col. WILLIAM H. G. FULLER
- Col. P. ERNEST GABEL
- Col. AMAURY MANUEL GANDIA
- Col. GLENN HOWBERT GARRISON
- Col. DOUGLAS GRAVER GILBERT
- Col. PAUL NELSON GILLON
- Col. WILLIAM JAMES GIVEN
- Col. RODNEY CLEVELAND GOTT
- Col. GEORGE RUSHMORE GRETSER
- Col. ALSTON GRIMES
- Col. PATRICK WILLIAM GUINEY
- Col. ROBERT WORMAN HAIN
- Col. MILLARD LOREN HASKIN
- Col. JESSE M. HAWKINS
- Col. LEO HAROLD HEINTZ
- Col. EDWARD GEORGE HERB
- Col. DANIEL LIGHT HINE
- Col. ADRIAN LEONARD HOEBEKE
- Col. ARTHUR ADRIAN HOLMES
- Col. FERDINAND M. HUMPHRIES
- Col. WILLIAM ANDERSON HUNT
- Col. FRANK PATTERSON HUNTER
- Col. CLYDE LUCKEN JONES
- Col. HERMAN H. KAESSER
- Col. MAURICE E. KAISER
- Col. MATTHEW W. KANE
- Col. VICTOR HALLER KING
- Col. RUSSELL R. KLANDERMAN
- Col. ANTHONY FRANK KLEITZ
- Col. PAUL ELTON LADUE
- Col. GORDON P. LARSON
- Col. ROBERT JOHN LAWLOR
- Col. CYRIL J. LETZELTER
- Col. JOHN HARDY LEWIS
- Col. CHARLES ELLSWORTH LEYDECKER
- Col. LAFAR LIPSCOMB
- Col. W. BRUCE LOGAN
- Col. CAM LONGLEY
- Col. STANLEY N. LONNING
- Col. GUY CECIL LOTHROP
- Col. CHALMER KIRK McCLELLAND
- Col. ARTHUR ALFRED McCRARY
- Col. EARL JACOB MACHEREY
- Col. EDWARD DEANE MARSHALL
- Col. VICTOR EDWARD MASTON
- Col. JOHN DOUGLAS MATHESON
- Col. RICHARD L. MATTESON
- Col. ROBERT WOLCOTT MEALS
- Col. LAUREN W. MERRIAM
- Col. JOSHUA R. MESSERSMITH
- Col. CHARLES HARLOW MILES
- Col. AUSTIN A. MILLER
- Col. CLAYTON E. MULLINS
- Col. SAMUEL ABNER MUNDELL
- Col. HARDIN L. OLSON
- Col. JOSEPH H. O'MALLEY
- Col. SAMUEL EDWARD OTTO
- Col. DANIEL PARKER
- Col. CHARLES GOYER PATTERSON
- Col. JAMES PUGH PEARSON
- Col. JOSEPH MENZIE PITTMAN
- Col. HERBERT CHARLES PLAPP
- Col. PHILLIP H. C. POPE
- Col. GWINN U. PORTER
- Col. GARDNER WELLINGTON PORTER
- Col. CHARNER WEAVER POWELL
- Col. JAMES RHODEN PRITCHARD
- Col. Edson Raff
- Col. LAMAR CECIL RATCLIFFE
- Col. GERALD L. ROBERSON
- Col. FRANKLIN GIBNEY ROTHWELL
- Col. JACK WALLACE RUDOLPH
- Col. JOHN FREDERICK SCHMELZER
- Col. BRUCE von G. SCOTT
- Col. JOHN NEWMAN SCOVILLE
- Col. FRANK HARRIS SHEPARDSON
- Col. JOHN BAIRD SHINBERGER
- Col. VERNON CLEVELAND SMITH
- Col. ANDREW DONALD STEPHENSON
- Col. DUFF WALKER SUDDUTH
- Col. HARRY WILLIAM SWEETING
- Col. MARCUS TAGUE
- Col. RALPH TALBOT
- Col. WALDEMAR JUSTIN THINNES
- Col. ROBERT PENN THOMPSON
- Col. WILLIAM VERNARD THOMPSON
- Col. ROBERT TOTTEN
- Col. WILLIAM LIVINGSTON TRAVIS
- Col. HARRY SHELDON TUBBS
- Col. ARTHUR WILSON TYSON
- Col. CORWIN PAUL VANSANT
- Col. GEORGE LEON VAN WAY
- Col. HUMBERT JOSEPH VERSACE
- Col. DAVID WAGSTAFF
- Col. NEIL MERTON WALLACE
- Col. PAUL RUDOLF WALTERS
- Col. JOHN E. WATTERS
- Col. HOWARD ELWYN WEBSTER
- Col. WILLIAM PAUL WHELIHAN
- Col. CHARLES VINCENT R. WYNNE

== List of USMA class of 1933 lieutenant colonels (28) ==
- Lt. Col. DAVID V. ADAMSON
- Lt. Col. ROBERT EVENS ARNETTE, JR.
- Lt. Col. WILLIAM AGIN BAILEY
- Lt. Col. RICHARD CHURCHFIELD BLATT
- Lt. Col. ROBERT HURLBURT DOUGLAS
- Lt. Col. WALTER A. FLECKENSTEIN
- Lt. Col. LLOYD R. FREDENDALL
- Lt. Col. CLAYTON SAMUEL GATES
- Lt. Col. ROY DUNSCOMB GREGORY
- Lt. Col. JAMES VANCE HAGAN
- Lt. Col. MORRIS KING HENDERSON
- Lt. Col. DAVID THOMAS JELLETT
- Lt. Col. RAYMOND EMERSON KENDALL
- Lt. Col. WILLIAM J. LEDWARD
- Lt. Col. SEYMOUR ELDRED MADISON
- Lt. Col. LASSITER ALBERT MASON
- Lt. Col. RICHARD ENSIGN MYERS
- Lt. Col. JOHN D. O'REILLY
- Lt. Col. IVAN WALTER PARR
- Lt. Col. FRANCIS IDEN POHL
- Lt. Col. ROBERT WILKINSON RAYBURN
- Lt. Col. WILLIAM HADLEY RICHARDSON
- Lt. Col. HAROLD LINDSAY RICHEY
- Lt. Col. DANIEL W. SMITH
- Lt. Col. JACK WELLINGTON TURNER
- Lt. Col. CHARLES E. VOORHEES
- Lt. Col. JOSEPH ERMINE WILLIAMS
- Lt. Col. SHELBY FRANCIS WILLIAMS

== List of USMA class of 1933 majors (11) and captains (2) ==
- Maj. WILLIAM HARRIS BALL
- Maj. GEORGE HAROLD CRAWFORD
- Maj. CHARLES F. HARRISON
- Maj. JOEL LYEN MATHEWS
- Maj. THOMAS KOCHER MACNAIR
- Maj. HARRY JULIAN
- Maj. MILLER PAYNE WARREN
- Maj. HORACE B. THOMPSON
- Maj. HARRY WINFIELD SCHENCK
- Maj. EDGAR O. TAYLOR
- Maj. PAUL DOUGLAS WOOD
- Cpt. PETER PAUL BERND
- Cpt. SAMUEL M. McREYNOLDS

== List of USMA class of 1933 lieutenants (19) ==
- Lt. IRA BASHEIN
- Lt. ROBERT ALLEN BRUNT
- Lt. FRANK JAMES CARSON, JR.
- Lt. DAVID N. CRICKETTE
- Lt. RICHARD GLATFELTER
- Lt. PAUL R. GOWEN
- Lt. WINTON S. GRAHAM
- Lt. HENRY WALTER HERLONG
- Lt. CLYDE JARECKI HIBLER
- Lt. ERDMANN JELLISON LOWELL
- Lt. JOSEPH LOCKWOOD MACWILLIAM
- Lt. WILLIAM CUNNINGHAM REEVES
- Lt. JAMES MONROE ROYAL
- Lt. JEWELL BURCH SHIELDS
- Lt. EARL F. SIGNER
- Lt. WILLIAM GRAY SILLS
- Lt. LUELL L. STUBE
- Lt. TAYLOE STEPHEN POLLOCK
- Lt. JAMES DENNIS UNDERHILL

== List of USMA class of 1933 2nd lieutenants (26) ==
- 2nd Lt. RALPH ALSPAUGH
- 2nd Lt. ROBERT HAROLD BEANS
- 2nd Lt. TRAVIS A. BECK
- 2nd Lt. EDWIN MARTIN CAHILL
- 2nd Lt. JOHN S. CONNER
- 2nd Lt. IRA WHITEHEAD CORY III
- 2nd Lt. THOMAS deNYSE FLYNN
- 2nd Lt. ROBERT E. GALLAGHER
- 2nd Lt. THOMAS ALLEN GLASS
- 2nd Lt. EMILE JEANTET GRECO
- 2nd Lt. EDWARD JOSEPH HALE
- 2nd Lt. BEN T. HARRIS
- 2nd Lt. HENRY TAYLOR HENRY
- 2nd Lt. NEWELL C. JAMES
- 2nd Lt. JOSE' JOAQUIN JIMENEZ
- 2nd Lt. BEVERLY D. JONES
- 2nd Lt. JOHN ROBERTS KIMMELL
- 2nd Lt. D. GORDON McGREW
- 2nd Lt. RICHARD CHANNING MOORE
- 2nd Lt. THOMAS JOSEPH O'CONNOR
- 2nd Lt. BENEDICT RAY
- 2nd Lt. JULES VERNE RICHARDSON
- 2nd Lt. GEORGE GERALD C. SIMPSON
- 2nd Lt. JAMES HENRY SKINNER
- 2nd Lt. WILLIAM HOWARD THOMPSON
- 2nd Lt. GEORGE WARREN WHITE
- 2nd Lt. FRANK J. ZELLER
