= Sycamore, Pennsylvania =

Unincorporated community in Pennsylvania, US

- Unincorporated community
- Location within Pennsylvania
- Coordinates: 39°55′36″N 80°14′41″W
- Country: United States
- State: Pennsylvania
- County: Greene
- Elevation: 965 ft (294 m)
- Time zone: UTC-5 (Eastern (EST))
  - Summer (DST): UTC-4 (EDT)
- ZIP code: 15364
- Area codes: 724, 878
- GNIS feature ID: 1189206

Sycamore is an unincorporated community in Greene County, Pennsylvania, United States. The community is located along Pennsylvania Route 18, 4 miles (6.4 km) west-northwest of Waynesburg. Sycamore has a post office with ZIP code 15364, which opened on April 25, 1878.

== Notable person ==
- William J. Ely (1911–2017), United States Army general and writer, was born in Sycamore.
