= Military Order of Merit (Iran) =

Order of Military Merit
- 1st Class of the Order
- Type: Order of Merit
- Awarded for: Meritorious service or achievement
- Presented by: Iran
- Status: No longer awarded
- Final award: 1979
- First Class Second Class Third Class Ribbon of the Order

The Military Order of Merit was one of the numerous orders of merit of the Persian Empire. The jewel of the order was a lightblue enamelled cross with three arms. The order's centre featured a purple medaillon featuring the imperial crown of the Pahlavi dynasty.

The cross was laid on a wreath of palmleaves and two crossed scabbards, all in silver, and the ribbon was light blue with red borders.

The order was abolished due to the 1979 Islamic revolution.
