= William J. Ely =

United States Army general (1911–2017)

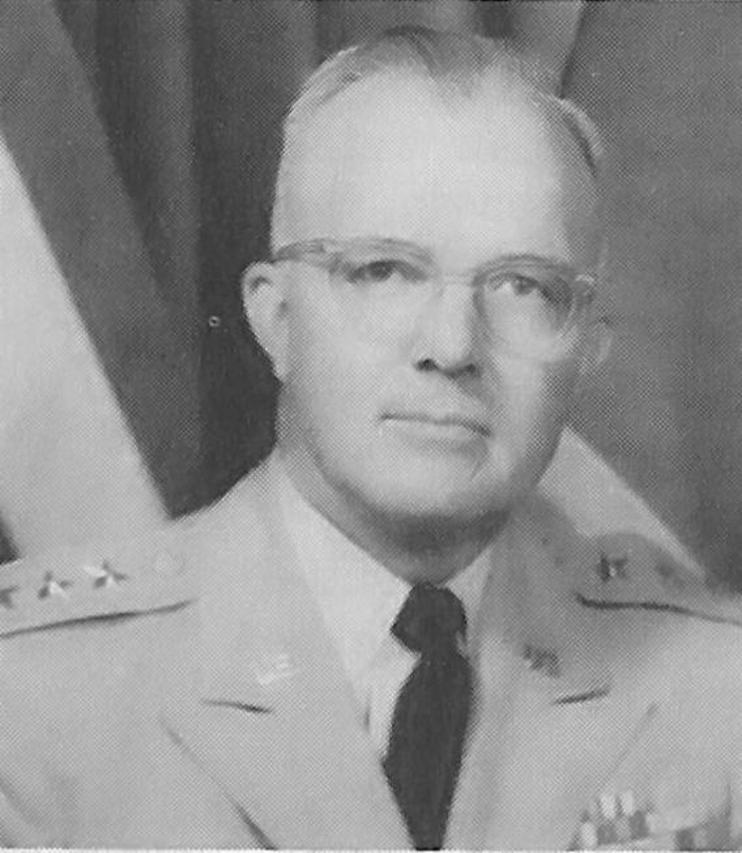
- Lt. Gen. William J. Ely in 1964
- Born: William Jonas Ely Sr. December 29, 1911; Sycamore, Pennsylvania, U.S.
- Died: September 20, 2017 (aged 105); Delray Beach, Florida, U.S.
- Military career
- Allegiance: United States
- Branch: United States Army
- Service years: 1933–1966
- Rank: Lieutenant General
- Conflicts: World War II
- Awards: Army Distinguished Service Medal; Silver Star; Bronze Star; Legions of Merit x2

William Jonas Ely Sr. (December 29, 1911 – September 20, 2017) was a lieutenant general in the United States Army. He graduated from the United States Military Academy class of 1933 and earned a master's degree in civil engineering from Cornell University in 1936. He served during World War II with the United States Army, and was stationed in Australia, New Guinea, the Philippines and Japan. He also served with the United States Army Corps of Engineers in the 1930s, in the Midway Islands. He was a Deputy Commanding General of the Army Development & Logistic Command and Deputy Commander of the U.S. Army Materiel Command.

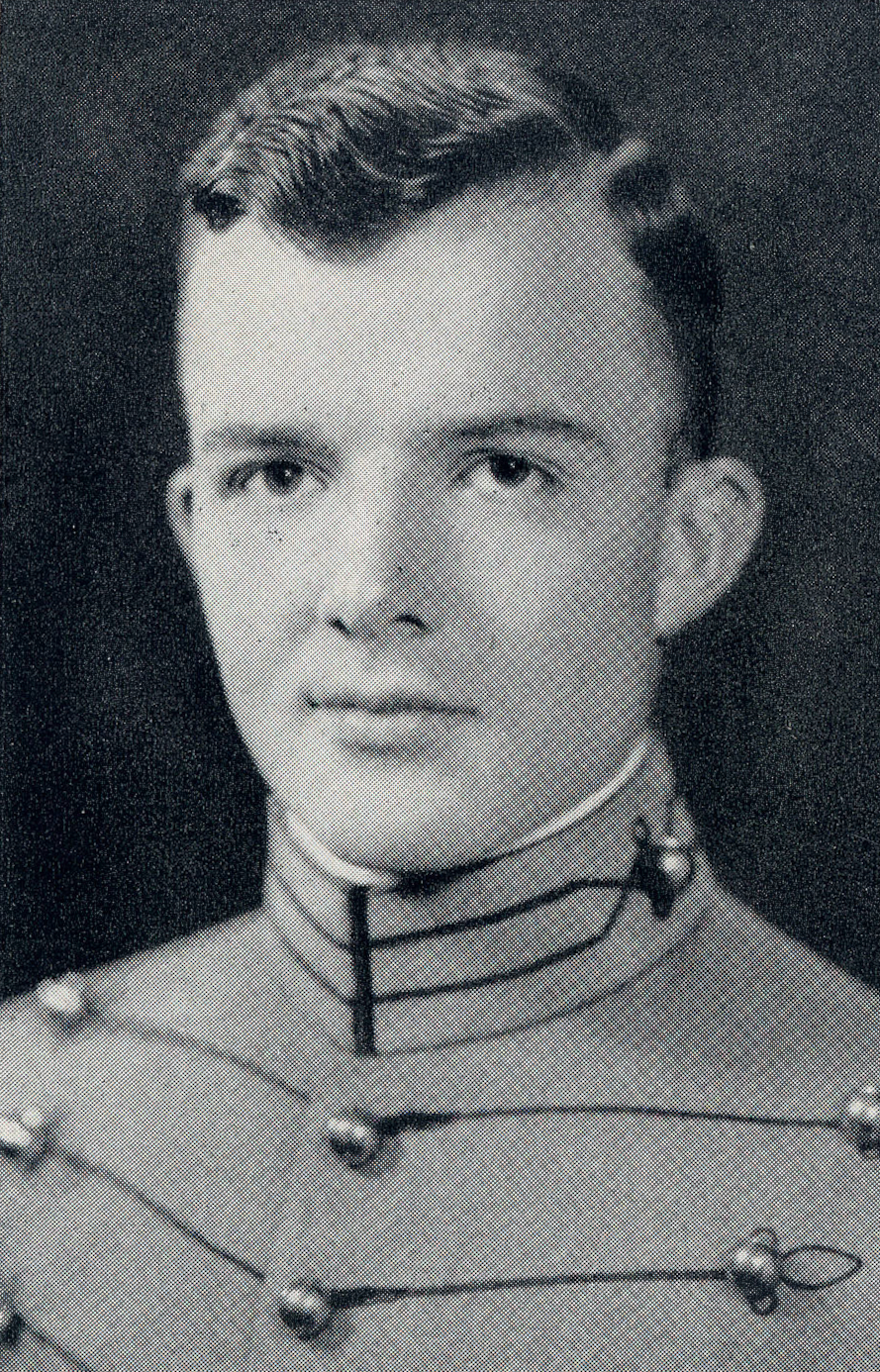
Ely as a United States Military Academy cadet c. 1933

Ely was born in Sycamore, Pennsylvania, the son of James Ross and Julia Folsom "Flossie" (Dille) Ely. His awards included the Army Distinguished Service Medal, Silver Star, Bronze Star, and two Legions of Merit. After his retirement, Ely, who was an avid golfer, designed, constructed and operated the Double Dam Golf Course near Pittsburgh, Pennsylvania. He won 10 championships, had nine hole-in-ones and shot his age more than 2000 times. He gave up golf when he turned 100 in 2011.

== Personal life ==
At the time of his death, Ely was the oldest living graduate of West Point. Ely was married to Helen Mountford (September 17, 1913 – March 25, 2014) from February 10, 1940 until March 25, 2014, when she died at the age of 100. He completed his autobiography, "The Oldest Living Graduate", at 103 years of age and resided at a nursing home in Delray Beach, Florida. At the age of 105, Ely returned to West Point for the academy's May 2017 alumni review.

Ely died on September 20, 2017, at the age of 105. He survived by his three sons, William J. Ely Jr., Richard M. Ely and Robert R. Ely (who all of them served in the army); and six grandchildren.
