= Shiloh Hills, Spokane =

Shiloh Hills
- Spokane Neighborhood
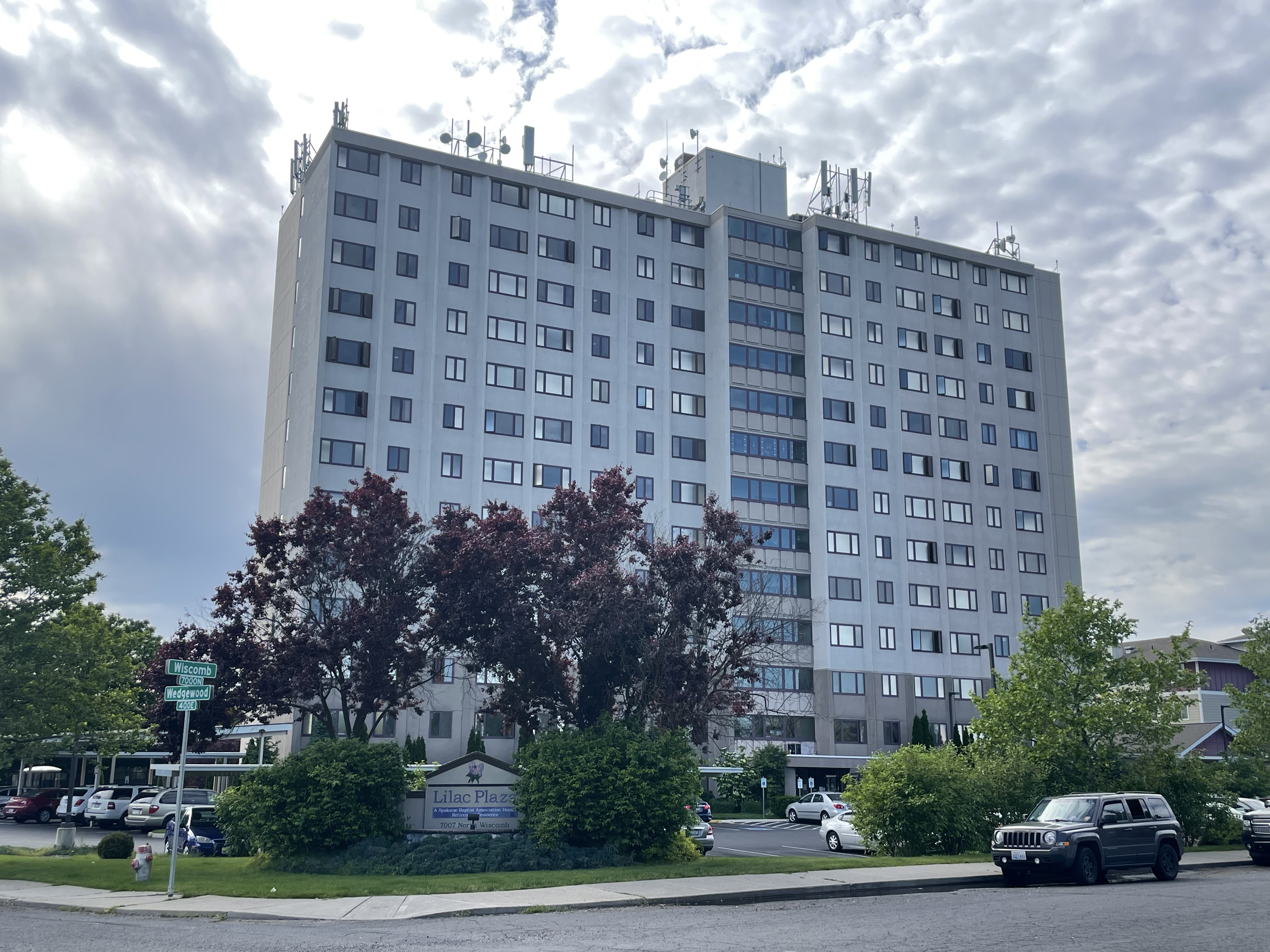
- Lilac Plaza retirement home in Shiloh Hills

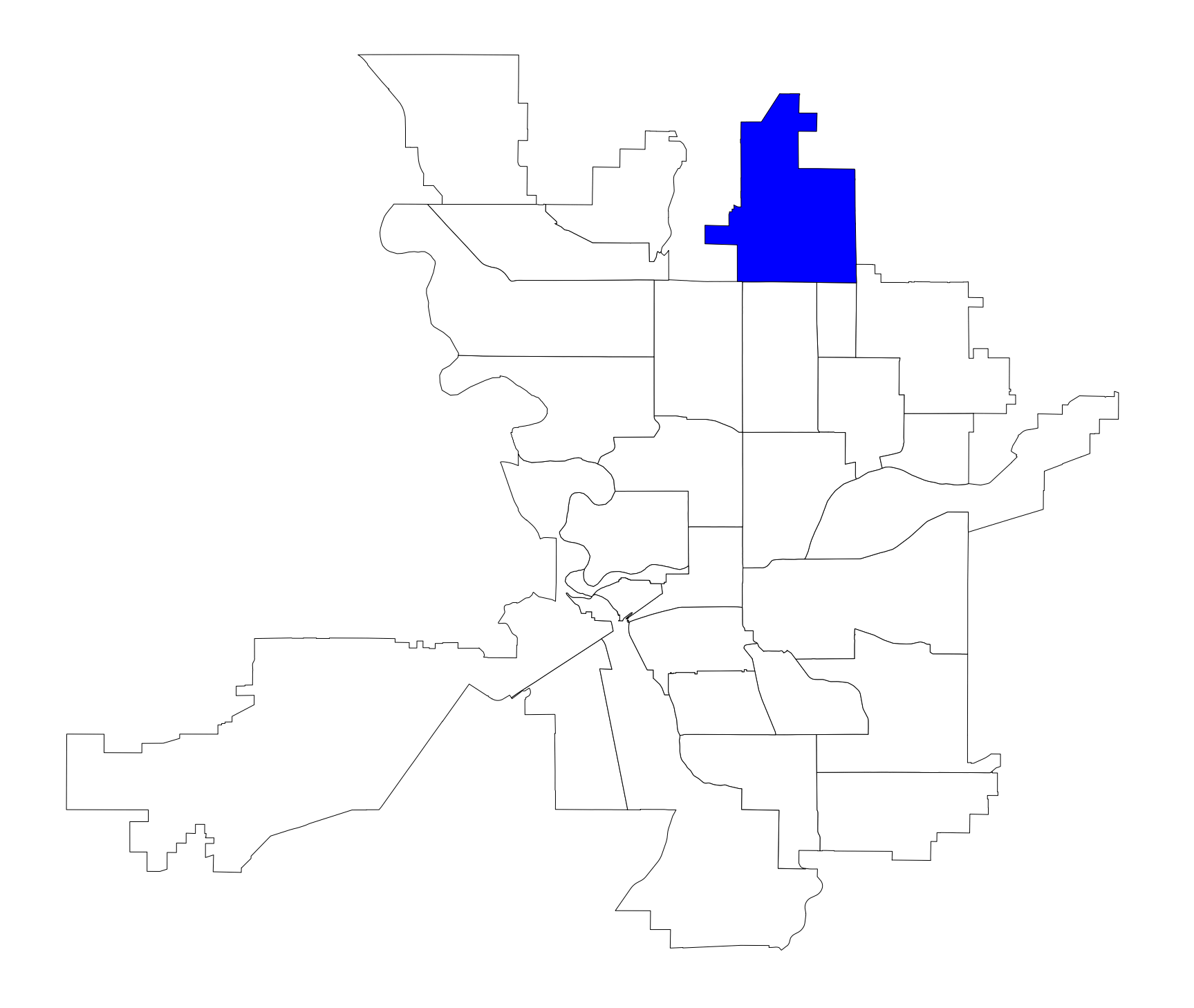
- Location within the city of Spokane
- Coordinates: 47°43′46.2″N 117°23′43.0″W
- Country: United States
- State: Washington
- County: Spokane
- City: Spokane

Population (2017)
  - Total: 15,944

Demographics 2017
  - White: 83.2%
  - Asian/Pacific Islander: 6.6%
  - Latinx: 6.6%
  - American Indian/Alaska Native: 2.1%
  - Black: 1.9%
- Time zone: UTC-8 (PST)
  - Summer (DST): UTC-7 (PDT)
- ZIP Codes: 99208, 99218
- Area code: 509

Shiloh Hills is a neighborhood in Spokane, Washington, located on the far northeastern side of the city. It is one of the newer areas of the city, initially annexed in the late 1960s with growth continuing into the 21st century. The neighborhood is home to residential, commercial and industrial districts as well as multiple regionally important transportation corridors such as the Division Street "Y".

== History ==
The Spokane people have lived in what is now Shiloh Hills for hundreds of years prior to the arrival of European settlers.

Shiloh Hills, prior to becoming Shiloh Hills and being annexed into the city, was home to a major transportation corridor through the region. Wagon roads traversed what is now the neighborhood since the early 1900s, connecting Spokane in the south with Newport in the north. By 1918, "The Y" began appearing on maps as the intersection where the Pend Oreille Highway split from Division Street. The Y was first paved in 1932 and has since become one of the busiest, most iconic intersections in the Spokane area.

Francis Avenue, the neighborhood's southern border, was the city of Spokane's northern limit until 1967. The western half of Shiloh Hills, west of Nevada Street, was annexed into the city in 1967. The area west of Nevada was annexed in 1994. The most recent annexation in the neighborhood, along Division Avenue in what was formerly Town and Country, happened in 2008.

Development in Shiloh Hills did not begin until the 1960s, and it continues to grow into the 2020s. Prior to 2016, Shiloh Hills was part of the Nevada/Lidgerwood neighborhood, along with what is now Nevada Heights to the south. The two neighborhoods split in 2016 along Francis Avenue, the longtime city limits. The split was driven by differences in demographics and connectivity with the rest of the city between the newer developments in Shiloh Hills and the older developments of Nevada Heights. In contrast to the older developments south of Francis Avenue, Shiloh Hills has single family housing subdivisions that feature a more curvilinear street layout and has a large amount of medium density residential apartment complexes as well as strip malls. The Northpointe Plaza is a neighborhood shopping center located just north of "the Y" on the Newport Highway and was developed in the 1990s; it has many big box retail stores that draw in shoppers from other areas of the north side.

== Geography ==
Shiloh Hills is bounded by Francis Avenue on the south, separating the neighborhood from the Nevada Heights and Whitman Neighborhoods. The eastern, northern and western boundaries follow the city limits. Crestline Street serves as the eastern border in the south with Nevada Street serving as most of the border in the north. Division Street serves as most of the western border, separating Shiloh Hills from Town and Country and Country Homes. The northern border is irregular, following multiple streets between Division in the west and Nevada and Crestline in the east with Hawthorne Road being its northern extent.

The terrain in the southern half of Shiloh Hills is flat, but the northern half lives up to the neighborhood's name. In the north the terrain is hilly as the land begins to descend into the valley of the Little Spokane River.

Shiloh Hills is home to numerous land uses, with areas zoned residential, commercial and industrial. The corridor along Division and Newport Highway in the west is zoned commercial, as is the corridor along Francis in the south. Areas in the northeast and southeast are zoned for light industrial, with a pocket of high industrial zoning in the northeast corner. The interior of the neighborhood is a mix of single and multi-family residential zones.

Public open spaces in the neighborhood include Friendship Park, Hill N Dale Rotary Park and the field and playground at Shiloh Hills Elementary. Friendship Park was established in 1978 and includes a paved walking trail, park benches and picnic tables, public restrooms, and a play area and splashpad as well as athletic facilities such as tennis courts and a soccer field.

== Demographics ==
As of 2017, there were 15,944 residents in the neighborhood across 7,448 households, of which 47.5% earned less than $35,000 per year. 72% of households were rented, compared to 45.3% citywide. 22.7% of the residents were aged 19 or younger, compared to 21.9% citywide. Those over 65 made up 17.7% of the population, compared to 14.5% citywide. The median household income was $34,401, compared to $44,768 citywide. 21% of the population had a bachelor's degree or higher, while 29.9% had at most a high school diploma. The unemployment rate was 4.7% compared to 6.5% citywide. 65.5% of students qualify for free or reduced lunch, compared to 54.5% citywide.

== Education ==
Shiloh Hills is served by two school districts, Spokane Public Schools and the Mead School District. The neighborhood south of Lincoln Road is part of Spokane Public Schools, and to the north is in the Mead School District. Linwood Elementary serves the southwestern portion of the neighborhood, which then feeds into Salk Middle School and Shadle Park High School. Arlington Elementary serves the southeastern portion of the neighborhood east of Nevada Street, which then feeds into Shaw Middle School and John R. Rogers High School.

Shiloh Hills Elementary is located in the neighborhood and is part of the Mead School District. It serves the remainder of the neighborhood north of Lincoln Road. Shiloh Hills Elementary feeds into Mountainside Middle School and then into Mt. Spokane High School.

== Transportation ==
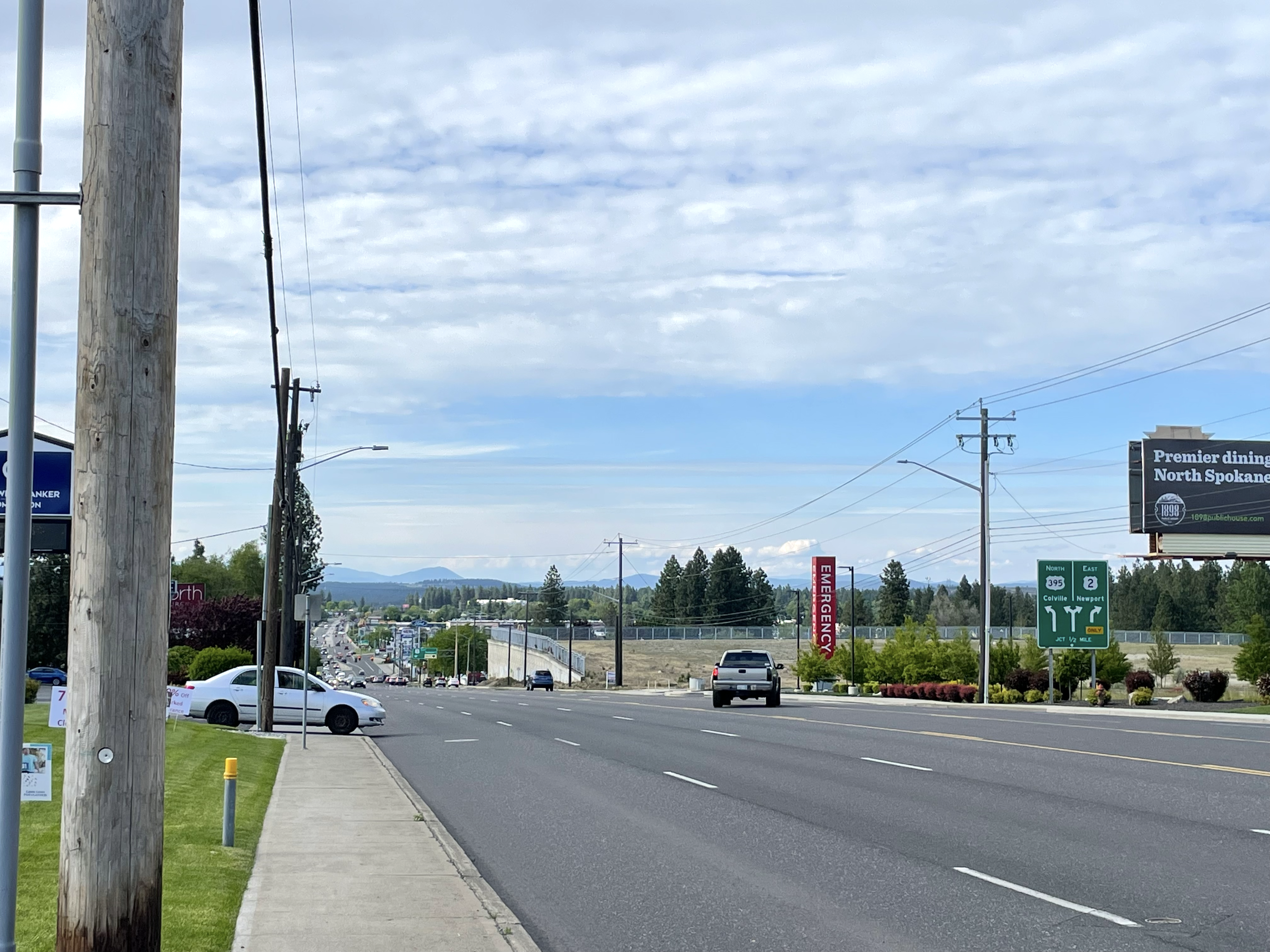
"The Y" where U.S. 2 and U.S. 395 split in Shiloh Hills, a major intersection in the greater Spokane area.

=== Highway ===
- - U.S. 2 - to Newport (north) and Spokane (south)

U.S. 2 passes north–south through Shiloh Hills along Division Street.

- - U.S. 395 - to Colville (north) and Spokane (south)

U.S. 395 passes through Shiloh Hills along Division Street.

- - State Route 291 - to Tumtum (north) and Spokane (south)

State Route 291 runs west along Francis Avenue from its southern terminus at Division Street in the extreme southwest corner of Shiloh Hills.

=== Surface Streets ===
Shiloh Hills does not conform to the city's street grid, instead taking on a more suburban style with winding roads and cul-de-sacs common. Despite that, the neighborhood is well connected to the city and surrounding region with numerous arterials. Division, Francis, Hawthorne, Lincoln, Nevada and Newport Highway are all classified as principal arterials by the city, while Crestline and Magnesium are classified as minor arterials. Addison/Standard, Cozza, Holland and Lyons are classified as major collectors, while Colton, Jay, Helena and Sharpsburg are classified as minor collectors. The rest of the streets in Shiloh Hills are local access.

A residential development in the neighborhood has streets named after Civil War battles and generals, including Confederate officers such as Robert E. Lee and Stonewall Jackson.

=== Public Transit ===
The Spokane Transit Authority, the region's public transportation provider, serves Shiloh Hills with four fixed route bus lines.

Route	Termini			Service operation and notes	Streets traveled
25; Division	Downtown Spokane; STA Plaza	↔	Fairwood; Hastings Park and Ride	High-frequency route	Division
26; Lidgerwood	Downtown Spokane; STA Plaza	↔	Shiloh Hills; Northpointe Shopping Center	Basic-frequency route	Addison, Standard, Wedgewood, Wiscomb, Weile, Standard, Lincoln, Nevada, Holland, North Dakota, Jay
27; Hillyard	Downtown Spokane; STA Plaza	↔	Balboa/South Indian Trail; Five Mile Park & Ride	Basic-frequency route; Downtown Spokane via Hillyard	Francis
28; Nevada	Downtown Spokane; STA Plaza	↔	Country Homes; Whitworth University	Basic-frequency route	Nevada, Hawthorne
