= Country Homes, Washington =

- CDP
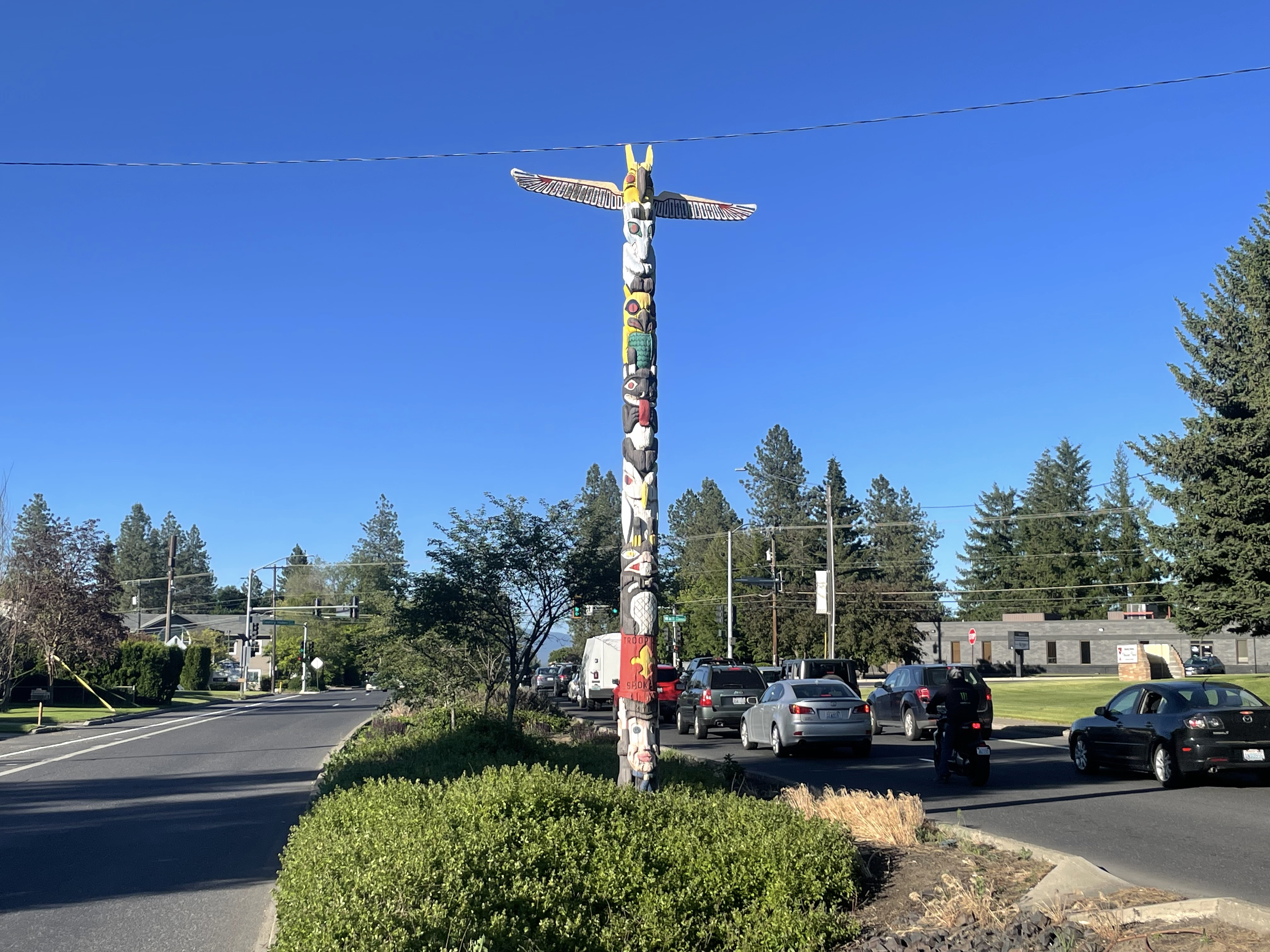
- Totem Pole on Country Homes Boulevard

- Location of Country Homes, Washington
- Coordinates: 47°45′04″N 117°25′11″W
- Country: United States
- State: Washington
- County: Spokane

Area
  - Land: 1.67 sq mi (4.3 km^{2})
- Elevation: 1,929 ft (588 m)

Population (2020 United States Census)
  - Total: 6,251
  - Density: 3,743/sq mi (1,445/km^{2})
- Time zone: UTC-8 (Pacific (PST))
  - Summer (DST): UTC-7 (PDT)
- FIPS code: 53-15150
- GNIS feature ID: 2407673

Country Homes is a census-designated place (CDP) in Spokane County, Washington, United States. The population was 6,251 at the 2020 census. The campus of Whitworth University is located in Country Homes. It is a largely suburban area that blends into the north side of the city of Spokane and the neighboring CDPs of Town and Country and Fairwood.

== History ==
What is now Country Homes was part of the traditional homeland of the Spokane people since prehistoric times. The tribe made great use of the nearby Little Spokane River which flows just north of the CDP. The first permanent European presence in the area near Country Homes came in 1810 with the construction of Spokane House by the North West Company of fur traders. The trading post was established where the Little Spokane meets the Spokane River, approximately four-and-a-half miles northwest of the current CDP.

Whitworth University was established in 1890 on the west side of the state and moved to its current location in Country Homes in 1914. Division Street, the main north–south thoroughfare through the north side of Spokane, which carries U.S. Highway 395 through Country Homes, was an unpaved road through the area until 1932 when pavement reached from downtown Spokane to north of "The Y" where U.S. Highway 2 and U.S. Highway 395 fork on the southeastern edge of Country Homes. Further integration with the expanding city of Spokane to the south occurred in 1965 with the construction of Country Homes Boulevard which cuts diagonally across the CDP in a southwest–northeast direction. Country Homes Boulevard connected the expanding suburban areas of Country Homes and areas to the north and northeast of Spokane with the core of the city and the at-the-time new Maple Street Bridge.

As the city of Spokane has grown and expanded north over the decades, Country Homes has remained an unincorporated area of Spokane County. This is despite the city of Spokane annexing areas to the east of Country Homes in 1967 and again in 1985. Areas to the west of Country Homes along the bluff of Five Mile Prairie were annexed in 1975 with additional annexations in 1984 and 1986.

== Geography ==
Country Homes is a suburban area on the north side of the Spokane urban area, just over five miles due north of Downtown Spokane. Roughly triangular in shape, the Census Bureau defines the CDP's bounds as from Five Mile Road in the northwest, along the northern edge of the Whitworth Campus and to U.S. Highway 2 in the northeast. Highway 2 and U.S. Highway 395, locally known as Division Street, mark the eastern boundary south until Country Homes Boulevard. The boundary follows Country Homes Boulevard southwest to Wall Street. The western boundary is more irregular, largely following a steep bluff which rises up to the Five Mile Prairie neighborhood of Spokane. In addition to Five Mile Prairie, Country Homes borders Spokane's Shiloh Hills neighborhood on the east, the CDP of Town and Country to the south and the CDP of Fairwood to the north.

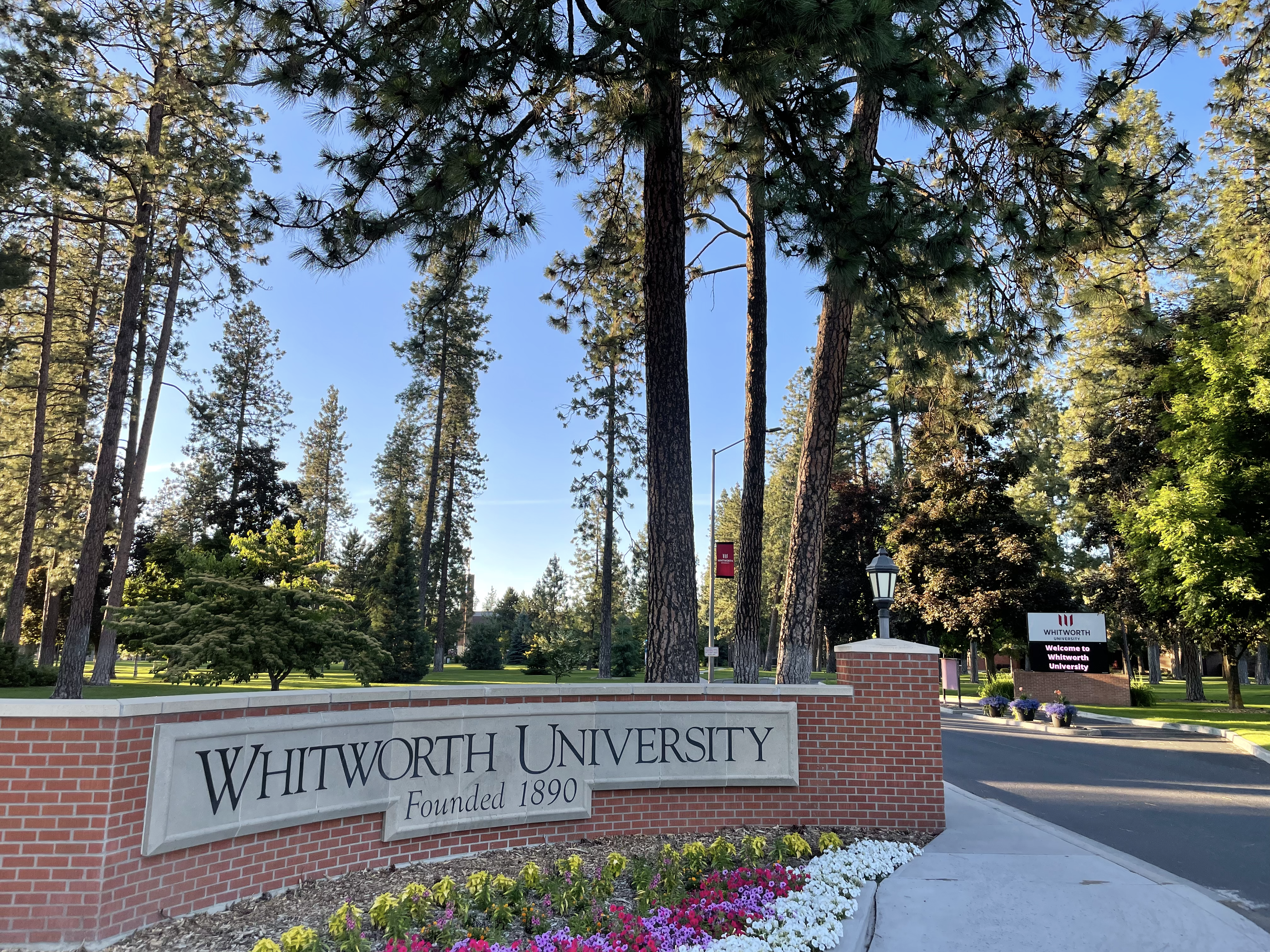
Whitworth University campus entrance on Hawthorne Road

Terrain within the bounds of Country Homes is largely flat and gently sloping to the north from approximately 2,000 feet above sea level in the south to 1,900 feet in the north. There is a steep bluff immediately to the west of Country Homes which rises to over 2,400 feet on what is known as the Five Mile Prairie. The northwestern corner of the CDP is located on the gentlest part of the bluff where development is possible. The southern portion of the bluff is much steeper and less developed, and also contains the Holmberg Conservation Area and park. Another shorter bluff runs along much of the northern boundary, falling off into the valley of the Little Spokane River, which flows just over one mile north of the CDP. A small, ephemeral has cut a valley through the western side of the Whitworth University campus along Waikiki Road down to the Little Spokane.

Country Homes is located at 47°44′44″N 117°25′3″W (47.745690, -117.417558). According to the United States Census Bureau, the CDP has a total area of 1.7 square miles (4.4 km^{2}), all of it land.

== Demographics ==
Historical population
Census	Pop.	Note	%±
1990	5,126		—
2000	5,203		1.5%
2010	5,841		12.3%
2020	6,251		7.0%
U.S. Decennial Census; 1970 1980 1990; 2000 2010

=== 2020 Census ===
As of the census of 2020, there were 6,251 people, 2,082 housing units and 1,825 families in the CDP. The population density was 3,677 people per square mile and the housing density was 1,225 units per square mile. The Racial makeup of the CDP was 79.77% White, 2.67% African American, 1.16% Native American, 3.08% Asian, 1.15% Pacific Islander, 2.33% from other races, and 9.80% from two or more races. Hispanic or Latino of any race were 5.79% of the population.

=== 2000 Census ===
As of the census of 2000, there were 5,203 people, 1,821 households, and 1,161 families residing in the CDP. The population density was 3,066.6 people per square mile (1,181.7/km^{2}). There were 1,930 housing units at an average density of 1,137.5/sq mi (438.3/km^{2}). The racial makeup of the CDP was 91.35% White, 1.36% African American, 1.27% Native American, 1.92% Asian, 0.90% Pacific Islander, 0.73% from other races, and 2.46% from two or more races. Hispanic or Latino of any race were 2.48% of the population.

There were 1,821 households, out of which 29.0% had children under the age of 18 living with them, 48.4% were married couples living together, 12.1% had a female householder with no husband present, and 36.2% were non-families. 27.1% of all households were made up of individuals, and 9.9% had someone living alone who was 65 years of age or older. The average household size was 2.36 and the average family size was 2.83.

In the CDP, the age distribution of the population shows 18.9% under the age of 18, 27.4% from 18 to 24, 20.0% from 25 to 44, 19.0% from 45 to 64, and 14.6% who were 65 years of age or older. The median age was 29 years. For every 100 females, there were 82.8 males. For every 100 females age 18 and over, there were 77.7 males.

The median income for a household in the CDP was $36,630, and the median income for a family was $45,000. Males had a median income of $37,583 versus $23,550 for females. The per capita income for the CDP was $18,514. About 6.6% of families and 11.0% of the population were below the poverty line, including 8.6% of those under age 18 and 4.5% of those age 65 or over.

== Transportation ==
=== Highway ===
- - U.S. 2 - to Newport (north) and Spokane (south)

U.S. 2 passes north–south along the eastern boundary of Country Homes on Newport Highway.

- - U.S. 395 - to Colville (north) and Spokane (south)

U.S. 395 passes north–south through Country Homes along Division Street.

=== Surface Streets ===
In addition to Division Street and the Newport Highway, both of which pass through the area as major arterial rather than limited access highways, the neighborhood is well connected to the rest of the Spokane area through other surface streets. Country Homes Boulevard and Wall Street, along with Hawthorne Road east of Division Street, are classified as urban principal arterials by Spokane County. Whitworth Drive and Hawthorne Road west of Division Street are classified as urban minor arterials. Holland Avenue and Five Mile Road are classified as urban collector arterials.

=== Public Transit ===
Country Homes is served by the Spokane area's public transit provider, the Spokane Transit Authority, which runs three fixed-route bus lines through the CDP.

Route	Termini			Service operation and notes	Streets traveled
25; Division	Downtown Spokane; STA Plaza	↔	Fairwood; Hastings Park and Ride	High-frequency route	Newport Highway, Hawthorne, Division
28; Nevada	Downtown Spokane; STA Plaza	↔	Country Homes; Whitworth University	Basic-frequency route	Hawthorne, Whitworth Drive, Wall, Hawthorne
124; North Express	Downtown Spokane; STA Plaza	↔	Fairwood; Hastings Park and Ride	Express route during peak weekday hours	Wall, Waikiki

== Education ==
The community is served by the Mead School District.
