= Division Street (Spokane, Washington) =

Major street in Spokane, Washington, US

- Part of: US 395 between I-90 and North Spokane Corridor; US 2 between I-90 and Newport Highway
- Type: Arterial street
- Maintained by: City of Spokane, WSDOT
- Length: 11.25 mi (18.11 km)
- Location: Spokane, Washington
- South end: 37th Avenue (Comstock neighborhood)
- Major junctions: I-90 / US 395 / US 2 in Downtown Spokane; SR 291 (Francis Avenue); US 2 (Newport Highway)
- North end: US 395 / North Spokane Corridor

Division Street is a major north–south street in Spokane, Washington, United States. It travels approximately 11 miles (18 km) through a majority of the city, albeit non-contiguously through its southern portions, extending from the South Hill to Spokane's northern border and beyond into Spokane County, where it intersects with the North Spokane Corridor.

Its southern portions run as residential side streets while the majority of Division, and all of its northern portions run as an arterial road. As of 2018, its busiest portions from Downtown Spokane through North Spokane carried between 40,000 and 50,000 vehicles per day. Much of Division Street is designated as highways U.S. 395 and U.S. 2 as they run northward from Interstate 90 through Spokane to destinations north of the city.

== History ==
Division has historically, and still remains today, the busiest street in Spokane.

The street, north of the Spokane River, was originally called Victoria Street and was renamed to Division Street in October 1891 after the adoption of ordinance A114 by the Spokane City Council.

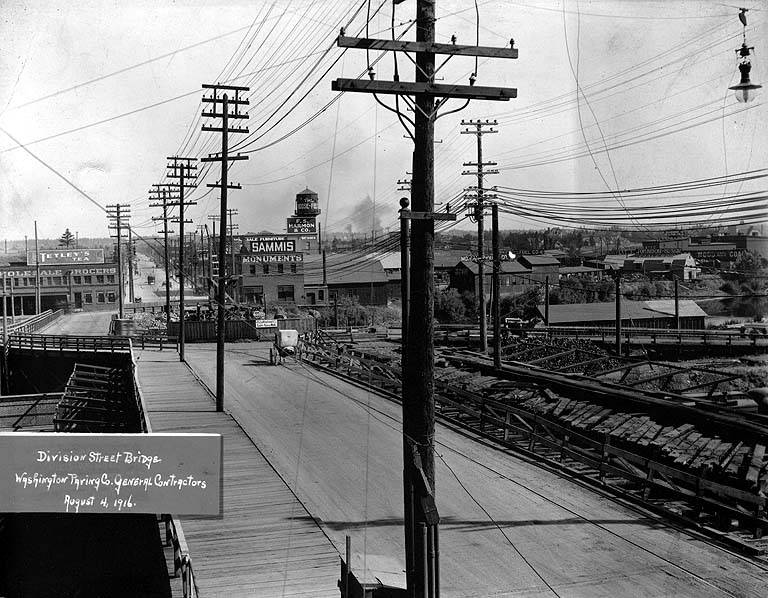
Division Street, 1916

In 1888, the first iteration of the Division Street Bridge was erected across the Spokane River, allowing Division Street to cross it for the first time. This bridge, built out of wood, was eventually replaced in 1892 with a steel bridge. In 1915, about 150 to 180 feet of the northern section of it collapsed, killing five people and injuring 12. The cause of the collapse was traced to granularization and crystallization in the steel, but opinions of the cause of the defects—either through repeated use of the bridge or manufacturing defects—differed. Due to the critical role of Division Street as a heavily used route in Spokane, discussions immediately began on how to restore connectivity between the two sides of the river. Building a permanent bridge replacement out of concrete would have taken too long, so several ideas were proposed including using steel slated for other bridge projects happening in Spokane at the time, or taking steel used to support falsework from the Monroe Street Bridge. In the end, a temporary wood bridge was constructed until the entire bridge could be replaced concrete bridge several years later.

Division Street "Y" in 1932, shortly after it was paved for the first time

Much of Division Street north of the Spokane River began as an unpaved road. It was not until 1929 that Division saw its first pavement moving north from Downtown Spokane when pavement was laid up to Garland Avenue. In 1930, it the pavement was extended to Wellesley Avenue. It wasn't for another two years in 1932, that pavement got extended further north again. The Division Street "Y" was carried cars on pavement for the first time on September 28 of that year.

Road lobbyists who advocated for roads in the Inland Northwest had aspirations for the northern extents of Division, such as near the Y, to maintain its natural beauty, hoping for the area to be development-free with additional plant trees along the highway. However, over the years, development and Spokane's continued growth eventually took over the area near the Y and the area is entirely developed today.

=== 1990s expansion ===
Division was widened through North Spokane from four to six lanes (three in each direction) in the 1990s.

=== Future ===
Division Street has remained largely unchanged between the 1990s and 2020s. However, with the expected opening of the North Spokane Corridor toward the end of the decade, it is expected that much of Spokane's north–south traffic will shift over to the freeway. The anticipated drop in traffic along North Division is expected to provide opportunities for the street to be transformed. In 2020, local government and transportation planning agencies launched a two-year long study to explore potential evolutions to Division including implementing rapid transit, making the street more multi-modal to better accommodate pedestrians and bicyclists, as well as land-use zoning changes that would increase density and bring residential development to the historically low density commercial corridor.

== Street grid ==
Division Street plays a major role in Spokane's street grid and house numbering system, which was established by the Spokane City Council in the early 1890s.

Ordinance A121, which set the system that Spokane still uses to this day, was passed by Spokane City Council on November 4, 1891. The ordinance identified Division Street along with Sprague Avenue, another major arterial in Spokane, as meridians to split the city up into four quadrants, referred to as the Northeast, Southeast, Northwest, and Southwest Divisions in the ordinance's language.

Division Street establishes the numbering system for roads running in the east—west direction. All roads running eastward from Division (in the Northeast and Southeast Divisions) utilize an "E" prefix in their address, with odd numbers running along the north side of those roads and even numbers running along the south side. Address numbers start at 1, and increase moving east. Roads running westward from Division (in the Northwest and Southwest Divisions) utilize a "W" prefix in their address. The numbering in these two western divisions is opposite of their eastern counterparts; odd numbers run along the south side of the road and even numbers run along the north side. Address numbers start at 1, and increase moving west.

Division Street's intersection with Sprague Avenue in Downtown Spokane is significant, marking the (0, 0) origin point for house numbering and cardinal direction prefixes for roads throughout the Spokane area. Additionally, because Sprague establishes the prefixes and odd—even numbering rules for roads running in the north—south direction, it also divides Division into North Division (where odd numbers run along the west side of the road and even numbers along the east) and South Division (where odd numbers run along the east side of the road and even numbers along the west).

== Route description ==
=== South Division Street ===
South Division spans approximately 2.4 miles (3.9 km) (including non-contiguous sections), beginning in the residential Comstock neighborhood on Spokane's South Hill at its intersection with Manito Boulevard. The road runs across the South Hill, northward toward Downtown Spokane, as a small, two-way residential side street. Due to the residential nature of South Division and the topography of the South Hill, the street is broken into several non-contiguous segments. Division runs north for about 10 blocks before being interrupted for approximately 8 blocks by Manito Park and Botanical Gardens. The road picks up again on the north side of the park and continues for 6 blocks where it is interrupted by Grand Boulevard and other roadways that descend the steep, north-facing slope of the South Hill. After 5 blocks, South Division picks up alongside Providence Sacred Heart Medical Center and Children's Hospital, continuing down the South Hill where it has an interchange with Interstate 90, passing underneath the freeway which runs as a raised viaduct through Downtown Spokane.

At this point, South Division enters Downtown Spokane and undergoes a number of changes. First, it is at the interchange with Interstate 90 that Division Street picks up its U.S. 395 and U.S. 2 designations that previously ran concurrently with the freeway. Division also widens into an arterial road at this point and converts to one-way road running northbound, operating as part of a couplet with the parallel Browne Street handling the southbound traffic one block to the west. This couplet continues northward for several blocks, passing underneath the BNSF Railway viaduct, where it intersects with Sprague Avenue and Division's prefix switches to North, becoming North Division.

=== North Division Street ===
North Division is approximately 9 miles (14 km) long and begins in Downtown Spokane at its intersection with Sprague Avenue, continuing northward through Spokane as a major arterial roadway, all the way to its northern terminus. The arterial runs at no less than three lanes in each direction for the majority of the rest of its run within city limits.

==== Downtown Spokane and University District ====
The initial section of North Division begins to pass through Spokane's University District, passing by Washington State University Spokane. Its routing continues South Division's one-way traffic couplet with the parallel Browne Street for a few more blocks until the two streets converge back into a two-way street at Spokane Falls Boulevard, located on the south landing of the Division Street Bridge, adjacent to the Spokane Convention Center. This intersection with Spokane Falls also provides a connection from Division to nearby SR 290 (Trent Avenue) that runs just to the east.

From Spokane Falls Boulevard, Division crosses the Spokane River via the Division Street Bridge, passing over the eastern extents of Riverfront Park and also providing access to the recreational Spokane River Centennial Trail that runs alongside the river beneath the bridge. After crossing the river, North Division splits up again into a one-way couplet, with Division taking southbound traffic and parallel North Ruby Street taking northbound traffic one block to the east. This couplet continues for about 1.5 miles (2.4 km), with four travel lanes per direction, passing through the rest of the University District, Gonzaga University, and the Emerson/Garfield and Logan neighborhoods.

==== North Division Street hill ====
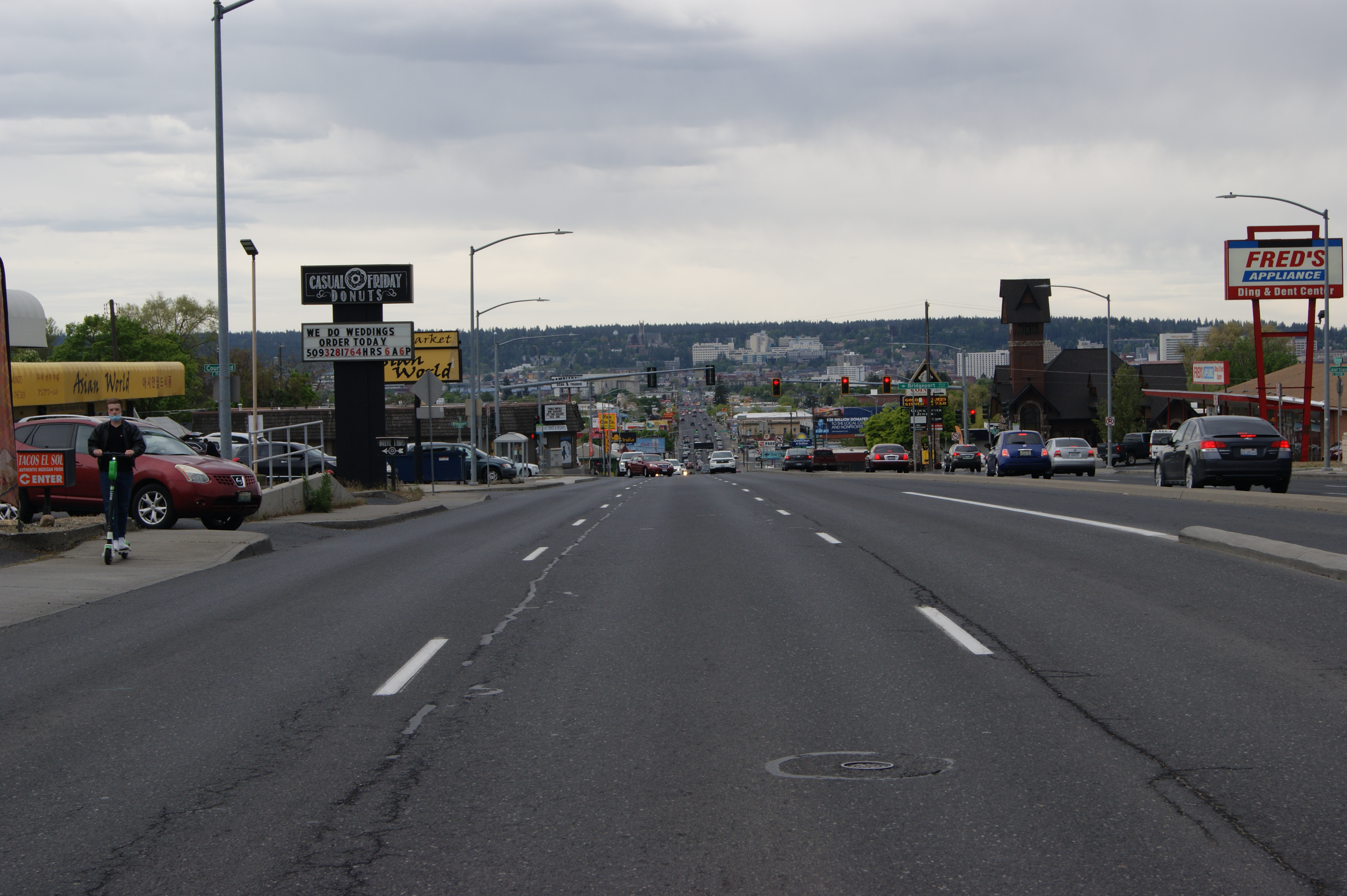
Division Street hill looking south

Division and Ruby Street converge back into a single two-way street again, just north of its intersection with N Foothills Drive and Buckeye Ave, continuing its run with three lanes in each direction. From there, Division ascends a gradual 0.75 miles (1.21 km) long hill for about 100 feet of elevation gain, entering the North Hill and Nevada Heights neighborhoods. While the entire length of North Division is flanked on both sides by commercial activity, this section of road between the vicinity of Buckeye Avenue and Garland Avenue is home to many local small businesses that draw customers from the Inland Northwest region and range from automobile shops, to Asian restaurants, jewelry stores, gardening shops, and clothing stores.

==== North Spokane ====
After ascending the North Division Street hill, Division continues in its 6-lane configuration for several miles toward the Shiloh Hills neighborhood. This particular stretch includes many of Spokane's more prominent strip malls, fast food, restaurants, big-box stores, and shopping centers, including NorthTown Mall between its intersections with Wellesley Avenue and Queen Avenue, and Franklin Park Commons between its intersections with Rowan Avenue and Central Avenue. Two major Spokane parks, B.A. Clark Park, and Franklin Park, as well as Holy Family Hospital are located along this section of North Division. Within this stretch, North Division also intersects with SR 291 (Francis Avenue).

About 0.3 miles (0.48 km) before its intersection with Lincoln Road, North Division's speed limit increases from 35 miles per hour (56 km/h) to 45 miles per hour (72 km/h), despite maintaining its commercial nature. After Lincoln Road, Division encounters another hill, this time descending down about 100 feet in elevation toward its intersection with Newport Highway. This intersection with Newport Highway is where the U.S. 2 designation that Division shares with U.S. 395 branches off toward Mead and Newport in a northeasterly direction. Because the shape that this intersection creates bears a strong resemblance to the English letter Y, as seen on a map, the intersection and immediate surrounding area is referred to locally as the "North Division Y", or more commonly "The Y", and is often used by locals as a navigational landmark.

Just after "The Y", North Division leaves City of Spokane's boundaries and continues to run north through developed suburban areas of unincorporated Spokane County. At this point, the roadway also reduces down to two travel lanes in each direction and passes by Whitworth University at Hawthorne Road. After Hawthorne Road, North Division's speed limit increases to 50 miles per hour (80 km/h) as it drops about 160 feet in elevation down another gradual hill toward Hastings Road in the Wandermere shopping area. About 0.75 miles (1.21 km) north of Hastings Road is Division's northern terminus at the North Spokane Corridor. Division Street transitions seamlessly into a divided, limited-access highway that keeps its U.S. Route 395 designation, but drops the Division Street name. US 395 continues into exurban and rural areas of Spokane County, eventually passing by Deer Park, Washington, on its way to the Canada–United States border.

== Character ==
North of Interstate 90, from Downtown Spokane onward, Division Street is characterized entirely by commercial development on both sides of the road, passing by numerous office buildings, strip malls, shopping centers (including NorthTown Mall), big-box stores, motel and hotel lodging, fast food, restaurants, auto dealerships, as well as the Spokane Convention Center. The road in this portion is no less than 3 lanes wide in each direction until it reaches "The Y", where it connects with the Newport Highway US 2 and reduces to two lanes in each direction while still maintaining its commercial character. The wide, straight streets of both Division and the Newport Highway make it attractive for illegal street racing; the Spokane Police Department, Spokane County Sheriff's office, and Washington State Patrol have conducted emphasis patrols to reduce reckless driving by groups congregating in abandoned store front parking lots then racing along its route.

The section of Division Street in downtown where it intersects with West Main Avenue on the edge of the University District is one of the city's primary destinations for nightlife. Division Street between Main and Spokane Falls Boulevard is flanked on both sides with bars and night clubs.

South of Interstate 90, past Providence Sacred Heart Medical Center and Children's Hospital in the healthcare heavy Medical District with its hospitals, clinics, and medical offices, Division exists as a side street, running through low-density residential neighborhoods until its southern terminus on the Upper South Hill. The roadway along this portion of Division is occasionally interrupted by topography and civic features.

== Public transportation ==
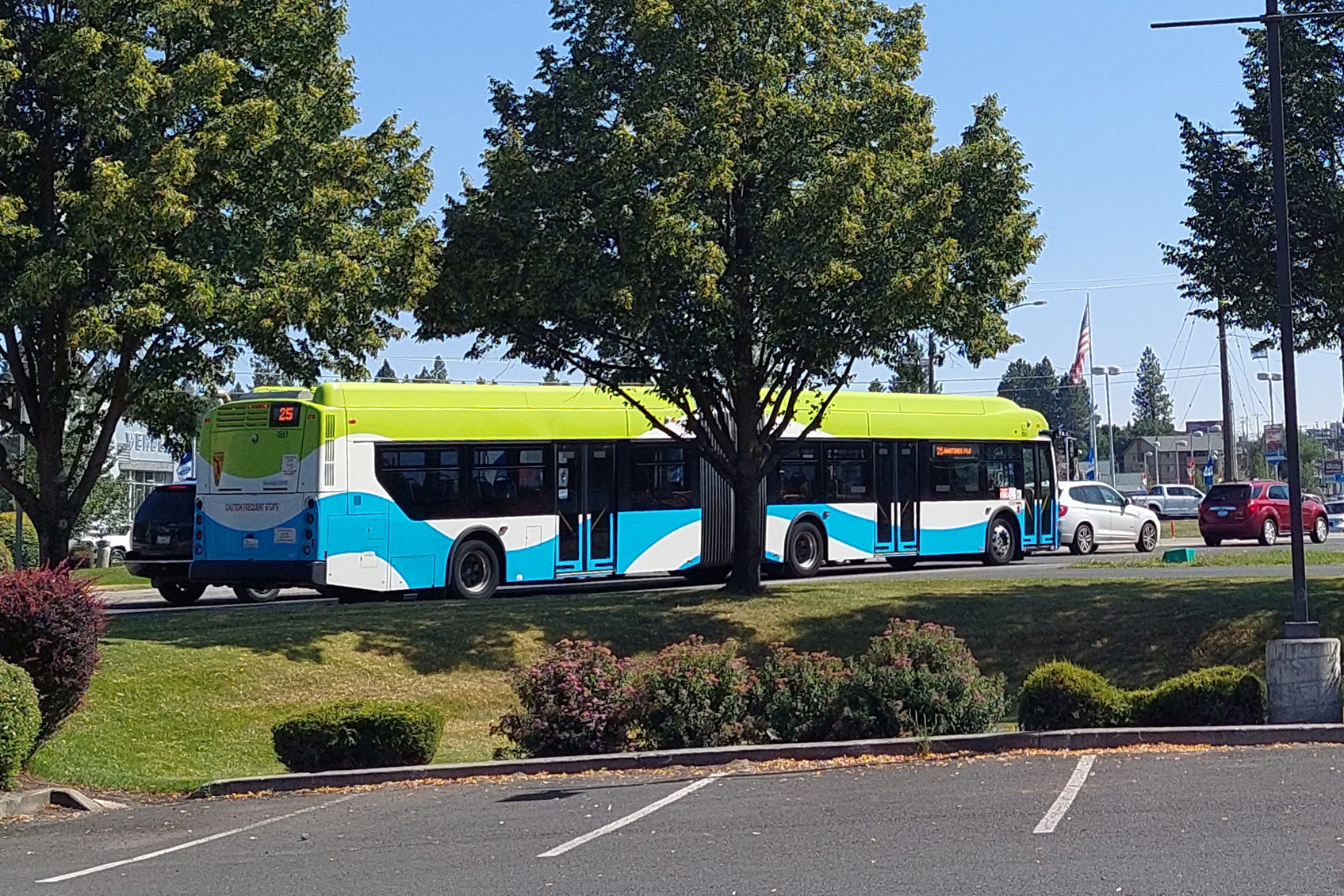
A Spokane Transit Authority bus operating as route 25 makes its way south at the North Division Y.

Spokane Transit Authority Route 25 serves a majority of Division Street from Downtown Spokane, northward, to the Hastings Park and Ride in unincorporated Spokane County, near Division's northern terminus.

As of 2020, the Spokane Regional Transportation Council and Spokane Transit Authority are leading a study in conjunction with the City of Spokane, Spokane County, and the Washington State Department of Transportation to implement bus rapid transit along Division.

== Points of Interest ==
- Manito Park and Botanical Gardens
- Providence Sacred Heart Medical Center and Children's Hospital
- Downtown Spokane
- University District
- NorthTown Mall
- Whitworth University
