= Town and Country, Washington =

- CDP
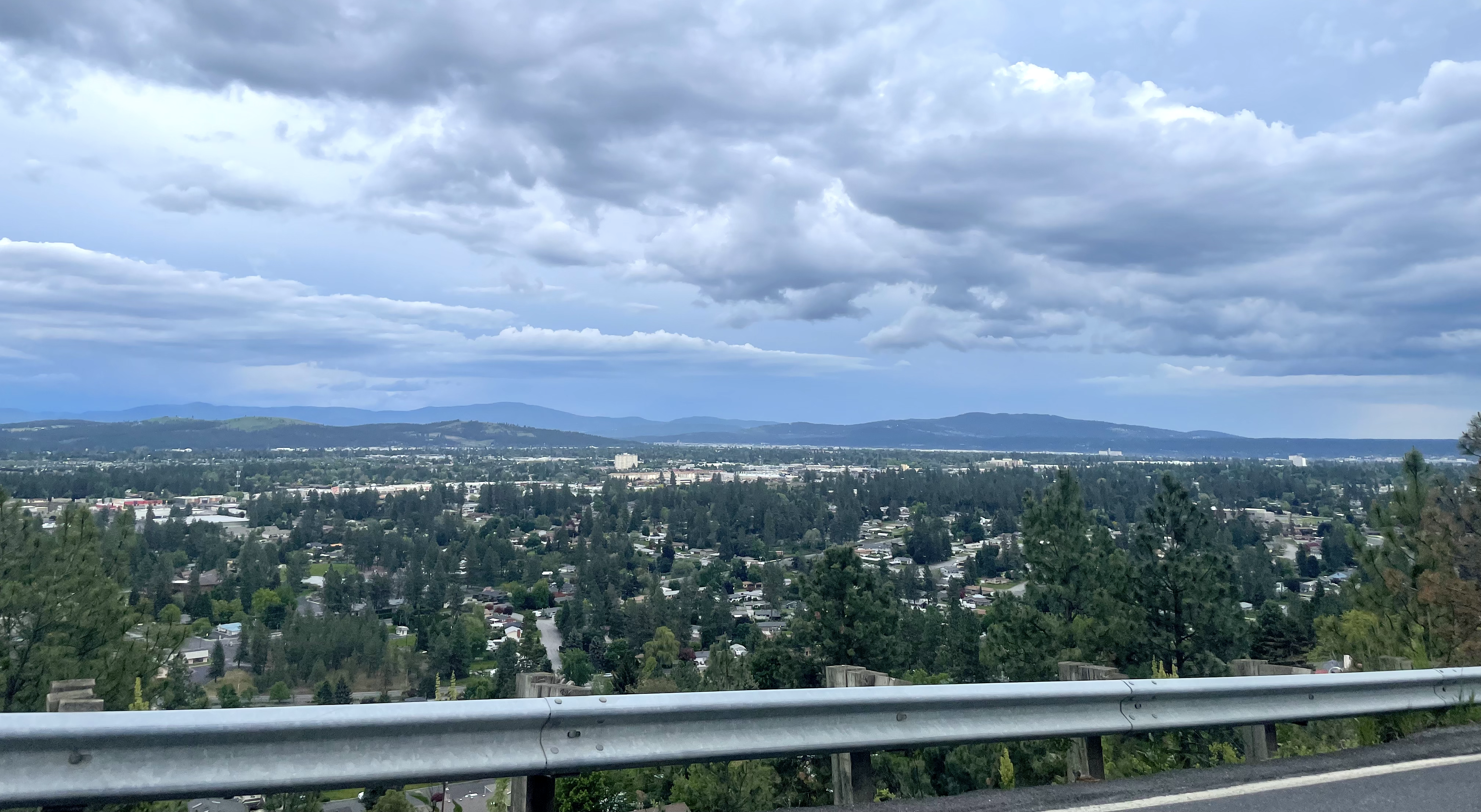
- Town and Country from Five Mile Prairie looking southeast
- Interactive location map of Town and Country
- Coordinates: 47.727965°N 117.422965°W
- Country: United States
- State: Washington
- County: Spokane

Area
  - Total: 1.200 sq mi (3.109 km^{2})
  - Land: 1.200 sq mi (3.109 km^{2})
  - Water: 0 sq mi (0.000 km^{2}) 0.0%
- Elevation: 2,014 ft (614 m)

Population (2020)
  - Total: 5,068
  - Estimate (2023): 5,398
  - Density: 4,222/sq mi (1,630/km^{2})
- Time zone: UTC−8 (Pacific (PST))
  - Summer (DST): UTC−7 (PDT)
- ZIP Codes: 99208, 99228
- Area code: 509
- FIPS code: 53-72170
- GNIS feature ID: 2409344

Town and Country (often referred to locally as 'Linwood') is a census-designated place (CDP) in Spokane County, Washington, United States. The population was 5,068 at the 2020 census, and was estimated at 5,398 in 2023.

== Geography ==
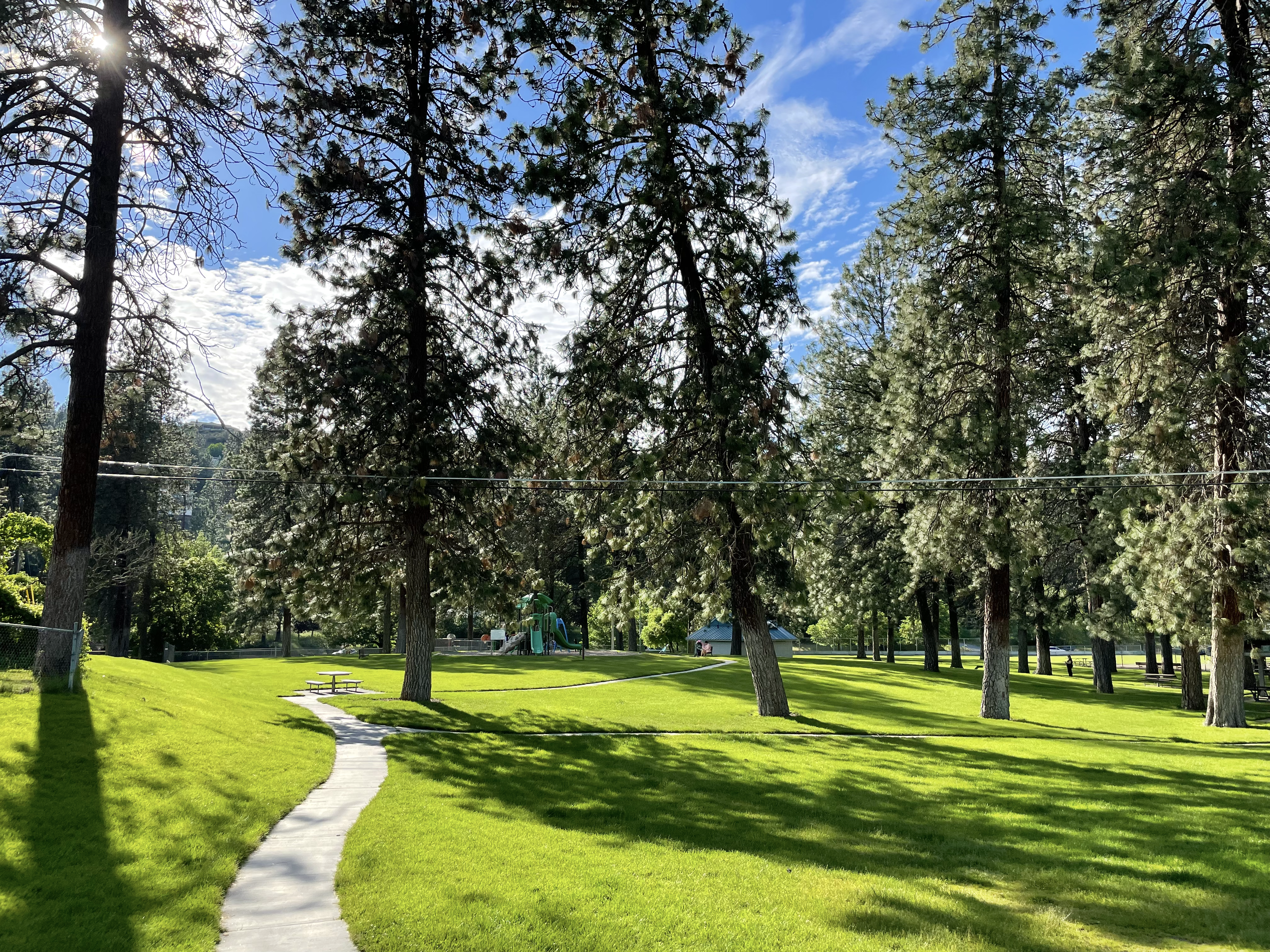
Linwood Park showing the Five Mile Prairie bluff in the background.

According to the United States Census Bureau, the CDP has a total area of 1.200 square miles (3.11 km^{2}), all land.

The city of Spokane surrounds the CDP on three sides: the east, south and west. The city's street grid continues into Town and Country uninterrupted in the east, though it breaks down in the west along the bluff leading up to Five Mile Prairie. The bulk of the CDP lies on flat ground like the surrounding north side of Spokane. Along the west, however, the terrain rises rapidly from Town and Country's elevation of roughly 2,000 feet to over 2,300 at the crest over less than 1,000 feet of distance in places.

As is the case with the city of Spokane to the east and south, Town and Country blends into its neighbor to the north, the CDP of Country Homes, Washington, seamlessly.

Francis Avenue, carrying Washington State Route 291, serves as Town and Country's southern border, beyond which lies the North Hill neighborhood. Cedar Road is the western border, beginning on the flatland and then climbing the bluff towards the crest and into Five Mile Prairie. Most of the northern border with Country Homes runs along Country Homes Boulevard. Division Street, carrying U.S. Route 2 was the eastern border until 2008, when the city of Spokane annexed some of Town and Country. Division is still the eastern border from Country Homes Boulevard south to Lincoln Road. South of Lincoln the border works its way around the Holy Cross Cemetery, which used to be part of Country Homes, before following Atlantic Street, which runs parallel to and one block to the west of Division, for the four southernmost blocks of the CDP.

Most of Town and Country is zoned as low density residential, but there are commercial zones along Francis Avenue in the south and Division Street on the east.

== Demographics ==
Historical population
Census	Pop.	Note	%±
1980	5,578		—
1990	4,921		−11.8%
2000	4,452		−9.5%
2010	4,857		9.1%
2020	5,068		4.3%
2023 (est.)	5,398	▲	6.5%
U.S. Decennial Census; 1970 1980 1990; 2000 2010 2020

Town and Country first appeared as a census designated place in the 1980 U.S. census.

=== 2023 American Community Survey ===
As of the 2023 American Community Survey, there are 2,074 estimated households in Town and Country with an average of 2.6 persons per household. The CDP has a median household income of $87,561. Approximately 8.6% of the CDP's population lives at or below the poverty line. Town and Country has an estimated 60.8% employment rate, with 22.1% of the population holding a bachelor's degree or higher and 95.2% holding a high school diploma. There were 2,196 housing units at an average density of 1,830.00 per square mile (706.6/km^{2}).

The median age in the CDP was 40.7 years.

=== 2020 census ===
As of the 2020 census, there were 5,068 people, 2,029 households, _ families residing in the CDP. The population density was 4,223.33 inhabitants per square mile (1,630.6/km^{2}) with an average of 2.56 persons per household. There were 2,087 housing units at an average density of 1,739.17 per square mile (671.5/km^{2}). The racial makeup of the CDP was 81.93% White, 1.82% African American, 1.52% Native American, 1.99% Asian, 0.73% Pacific Islander, 2.01% from some other races and 10.00% from two or more races. Hispanic or Latino people of any race were 7.16% of the population.

In the CDP, the age distribution of the population showed 25.2% under the age of 18 and 16.1% who were 65 years of age or older. Females made up 51.4% of the population. Of those age 16 and above, 66.7% were in the workforce, with 57.3% of females age 16+ in the workforce.

The median income for a household in the CDP was $66,911. The per capita income for the CDP was $28,608. 9.2% of the population were below the poverty line. Median value of owner-occupied homes was $212,300, with 75.0% of homes being owner-occupied. Median rent in the CDP was $1,143.

== Education ==
Town and Country is split between two school districts, with Spokane Public Schools serving the southern half of the CDP and the Mead School District serving the north.

Linwood Elementary, part of Spokane Public Schools, is located in Town and Country. It feeds into Salk Middle School and then into Shadle Park High School. Evergreen Elementary, part of the Mead School District, is also located in Town and Country. It feeds into Highland Middle School and then into Mead High School.

== Transportation ==
=== Highway ===
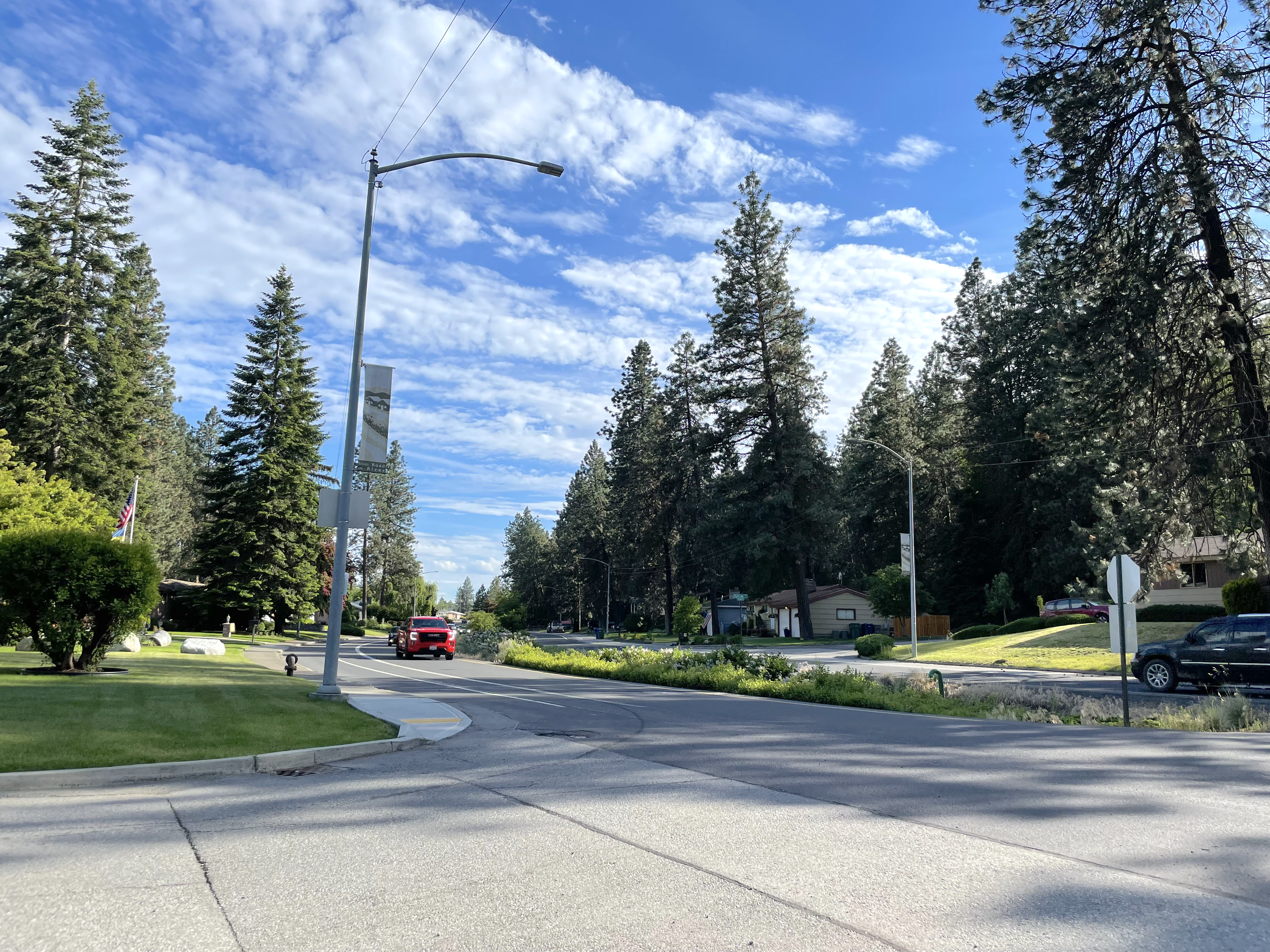
Country Homes Boulevard in Town and Country, showing the swale running through the road.

- – U.S. 2 – to Newport (north) and Spokane (south)

U.S. 2 passes north–south along the eastern boundary of Town and Country on Division Street.

- – U.S. 395 – to Colville (north) and Spokane (south)

U.S. 395 passes north–south along the eastern boundary of Town and Country along Division Street.

- – State Route 291 – to Tumtum (north) and Spokane (south)

State Route 291 passes along the southern boundary of Town and Country on Francis Avenue.

=== Surface streets ===
The three highways serving Town and Country all travel along surface streets and none are classified as limited-access in the area. Francis Avenue and Division Street are classified by the city of Spokane as major arterials, the city's highest classification for a surface street. While the city does not classify streets that lie entirely within Town and Country, it does consider the streets which connect to and serve as extensions of Country Homes Boulevard once it passes into the city limits to be major arterials as well. Country Homes Boulevard links the Maple/Ash couplet in the southwest with Division Street at a major intersection known as "the Y" in the northeast, making it a major thoroughfare in the neighborhood. It carried 26,400 vehicles per day in 2018, making Country Homes Boulevard one of unincorporated Spokane County's busiest roadways.

Dedicated bike lanes run on Wall Street, Country Homes Boulevard and Lincoln Road, and Cedar Road is classified as a shared roadway bike route.

=== Public transit ===
Town and Country is served by the Spokane area's public transit provider, the Spokane Transit Authority, which runs four fixed-route bus lines through the CDP. The Country Homes Park & Ride is located across the street to the north of the CDP and the Five Mile Park & Ride is one block to the south of the CDP.

Route	Termini			Service operation and notes	Streets traveled
4; Monroe	Downtown Spokane; STA Plaza	↔	Balboa/South Indian Trail; Five Mile Park and Ride	High-frequency route	Francis Avenue west of Monroe
25; Division	Downtown Spokane; STA Plaza	↔	Fairwood; Hastings Park and Ride	High-frequency route	Division Street
27; Hillyard	Downtown Spokane; STA Plaza	↔	Balboa/South Indian Trail; Five Mile Park and Ride	Basic-frequency route; Downtown Spokane via Hillyard	Francis Avenue
124; North Express	Downtown Spokane; STA Plaza	↔	Fairwood; Hastings Park and Ride	Express route during peak weekday hours	Monroe Street
