= Evergreen Elementary School =

Evergreen Elementary School may refer to:

- Evergreen Elementary, school in Mead School District, Spokane, Washington, USA
- Evergreen Elementary School (Wrangell), school in Wrangell, Alaska, USA
- Evergreen Elementary School (Marion County), school in Marion County, Florida, USA
- Evergreen Elementary School (Quebec), Lester B. Pearson School Board school in Saint-Lazare, Quebec, Canada
