= Mead Education Alternative Department Alternative High School =

Mead Alternative High School

Location
- 529 W. Hastings Road; Spokane, (Spokane County), Washington 99218; United States
- Coordinates: 47°46′04″N 117°25′18″W

Information
- Type: Public High School
- School district: Mead School District
- Principal: Bruce Olgard
- Staff: 11
- Grades: 9-12
- Website: M.E.A.D. Alternative High School homepage

M.E.A.D. Alternative High School is a learning community of non-traditional students and instructors in north Spokane, Washington.

== General ==
Students apply to the school voluntarily and admissions are mediated by personal interview, which seeks to establish the willingness of applicants to challenge themselves and take responsibility in achieving personal and academic growth.

Instructors operate in a conference-style, consensus-building format. Student input is encouraged through the regular participation of student representatives. The campus is a drug, smoke and firearm free environment. There are band and choir rooms, as well as a community garden, large-group meeting and performance space, private conference and supply rooms, and art and science activity centers. Classes are not held in secluded rooms, but are instead conducted in the stations occupied by each instructor. Students sit at a common table at which they can face and communicate with everyone at the station.

== Programs ==
=== CORE ===
The CORE program is a group-learning format involving independent projects and evaluation, group community service Field trips, and presentations, both school and community-wide.

=== GSL (Guided Student Learning) ===
The GSL program consists of weekly one-on-one meetings between the student and advisor, in which assignments are evaluated, proposed, delivered and designed. This option is most popular among students who may have other full- or part-time obligations such as child care, college classes, or work.

== Extracurricular activities ==
Extracurricular activities include:

- Mount Rainier Service
- Glacier National Park Service
- Open mic
