= Mead, Washington =

- Census-designated place
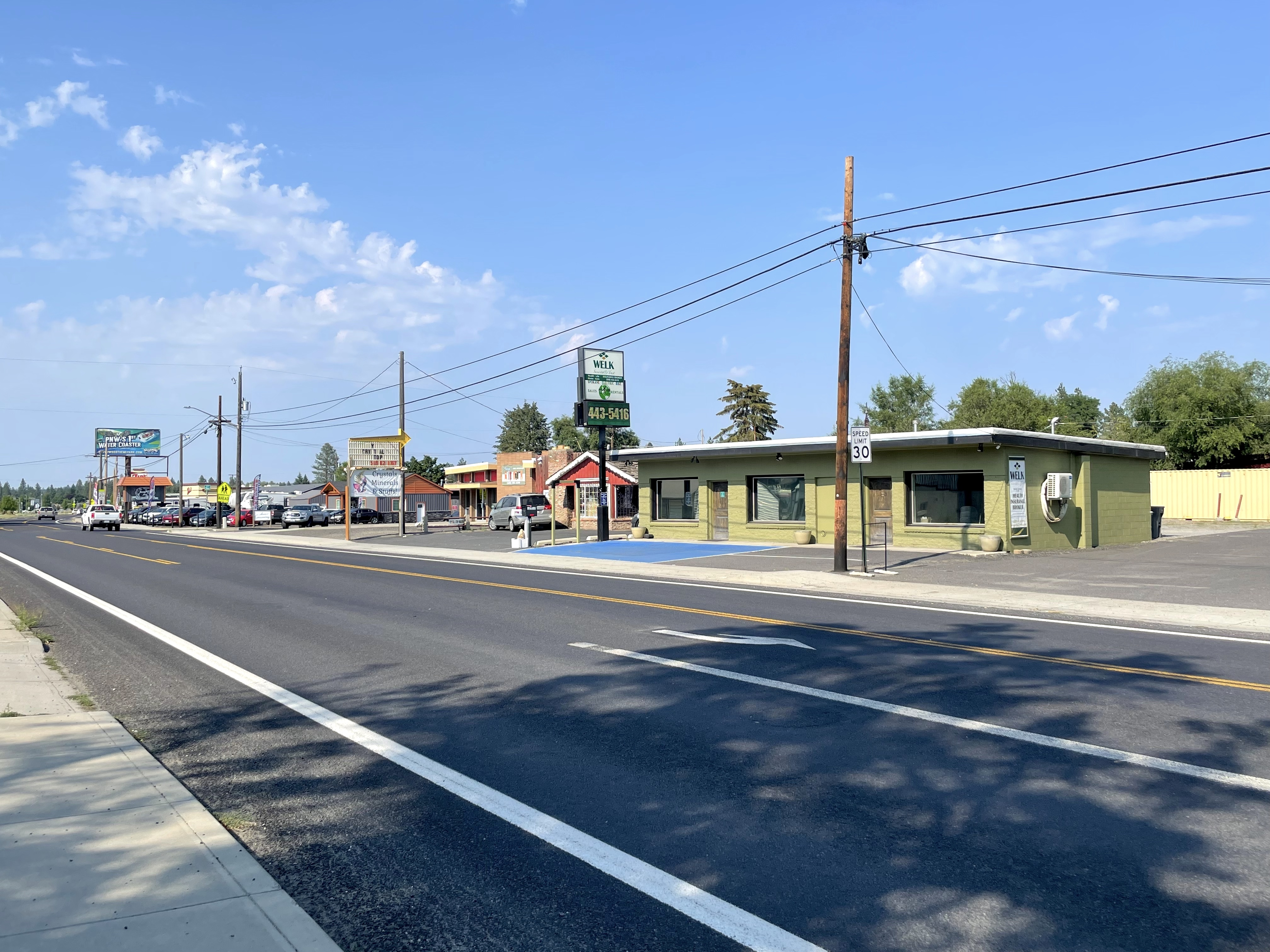
- Commercial district along Market Street
- Interactive map of Mead, Washington
- Coordinates: 47°45′58″N 117°21′18″W
- Country: United States
- State: Washington
- County: Spokane County
- Named for: George Meade

Area
  - Land: 7.26 sq mi (18.8 km^{2})
- Elevation: 1,782 ft (543 m)

Population (2020)
  - Total: 7,576
  - Density: 1,043/sq mi (403/km^{2})
- ZIP Codes: 99021, 99217
- Area code: 509
- GNIS feature ID: 2585005

Mead is an unincorporated suburb and census-designated place north of Spokane in Spokane County, Washington, United States. Named for Civil War general George Meade, this area is tracked by the United States Census Bureau. As of 2020, the population of Mead was 7,576.

In 1900, Mead was the second stop on the Spokane Falls & Northern Railway. The community included the Cushing & Bryant general store, a blacksmith shop, a public school with approximately 60 students, a Methodist Episcopal church, and a Sunday school. At the time the post office was located in the Cushing & Bryant store.

Mead is home to the computer game development firm, Cyan Worlds, makers of Myst and Riven. The Kaiser Aluminum Mead Works, which operated as a leading area employer from 1942 until curtailment in 2001, is nearby.

== Geography ==
Mead is located in Spokane County just north of the city of Spokane, specifically the Hillyard and Shiloh Hills neighborhoods, and west of Fairwood and south of Colbert. The area is split into two developed areas by Deadman Creek, which runs roughly east-to-west through Mead before entering the Little Spokane River in neighboring Fairwood.

The southern and older portion of Mead is roughly bounded by U.S. Route 395 on the west and a railroad on the east while the northern portion north of Deadman Creek spans both sides of Highway 2. Those two controlled-access roads converge on the western edge of Mead at a large spaghetti junction. The CDP of Mead comprises the former townsite of Mead in the south and an extension of newer development to the north, both of which are contiguous suburban areas within the Spokane urban area.

The original townsite of Mead includes streets named 1st Avenue through 4th Avenue, and a Main Street, not to be confused with streets with the same name in the city of Spokane proper. Mead is well-connected with the northern portion of the Spokane urban area via Highway 2, U.S. Route 395 and as the southeastern terminus of Washington State Route 206. Market Street connects the area with Hillyard to the south and Farwell Road connects Mead with Fairwood to the west.

Terrain in Mead is relatively flat, at approximately 1,900 feet above sea level, though the valley of Deadman Creek falls to below 1,800 feet and nearby hills immediately to the south and southeast of the community rise above 2,300 feet.

== Demographics ==
Historical population
Census	Pop.	Note	%±
2010	7,275		—
2020	7,576		4.1%
U.S. Decennial Census; 2000 2010

Mead first appeared as a census designated place in the 2010 U.S. census.

=== Racial and ethnic composition ===
Mead CDP, Washington – Racial and ethnic composition Note: the US Census treats Hispanic/Latino as an ethnic category. This table excludes Latinos from the racial categories and assigns them to a separate category. Hispanics/Latinos may be of any race.
Race / Ethnicity (NH = Non-Hispanic)	Pop 2010	Pop 2020	% 2010	% 2020
White alone (NH)	6,740	6,459	92.65%	85.26%
Black or African American alone (NH)	35	37	0.48%	0.49%
Native American or Alaska Native alone (NH)	68	54	0.93%	0.71%
Asian alone (NH)	33	83	0.45%	1.10%
Native Hawaiian or Pacific Islander alone (NH)	12	23	0.16%	0.30%
Other race alone (NH)	3	37	0.04%	0.49%
Mixed race or Multiracial (NH)	169	510	2.32%	6.73%
Hispanic or Latino (any race)	215	373	2.96%	4.92%
Total	7,275	7,576	100.00%	100.00%

== Transportation ==
- - U.S. 2 - to Newport (north) and Spokane (south)

U.S. 2 passes north–south through Mead and is known as the Newport Highway in the area.

- - U.S. 395 - to Colville (north) and Spokane (south)

U.S. 395 passes north–south along the southwestern boundary of Mead. The highway is part of the North Spokane Corridor.

- - State Route 206 - to Mount Spokane (east) and Mead (west)

Highway 206 runs west-to-east through Mead from its terminus at U.S. Route 2 to Mount Spokane.

== Education ==
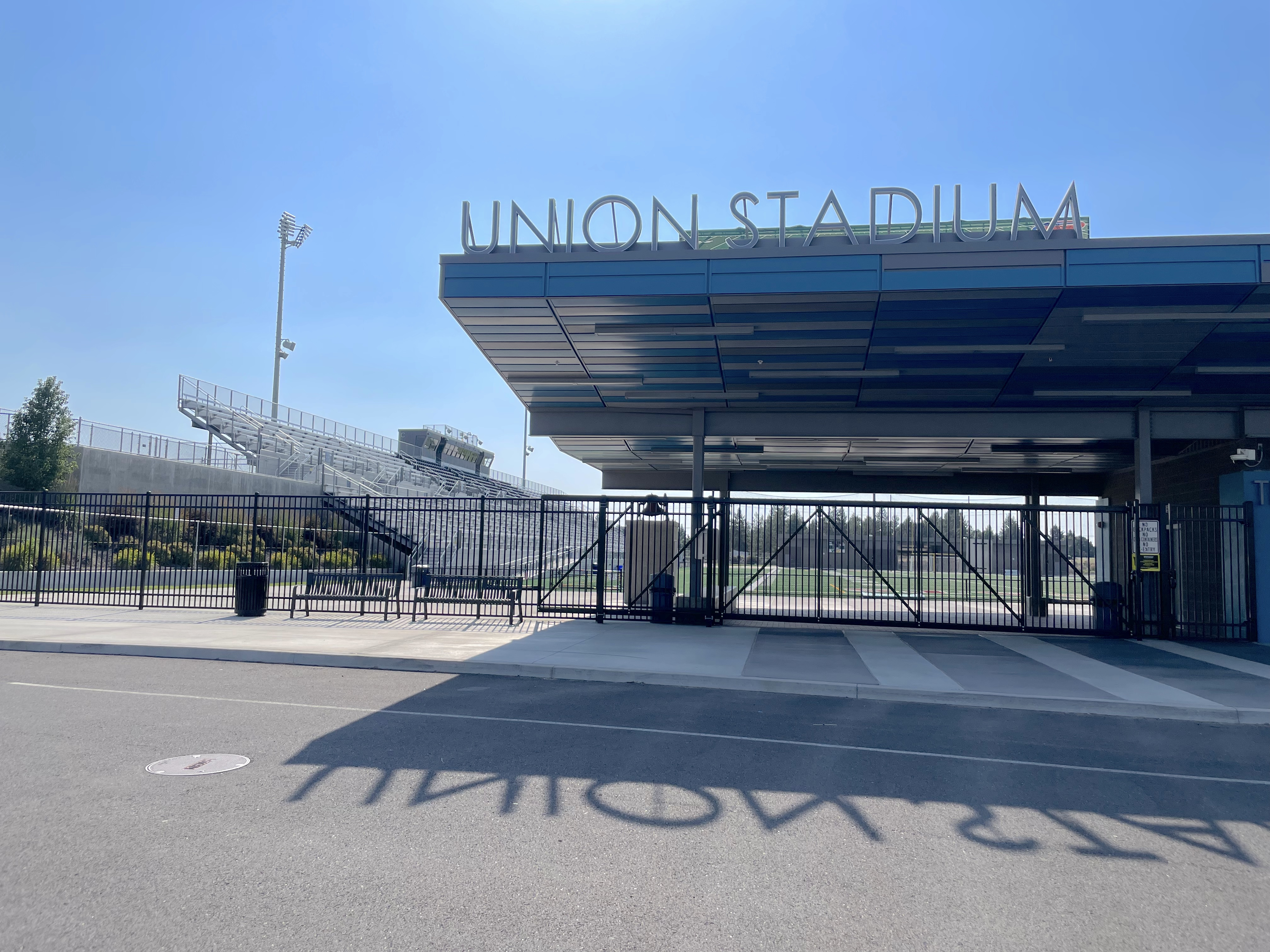
Union Stadium in Mead

The Mead School District, which is named after the town of Mead where its first school was built, enrolls approximately 9000 students in two high schools, two middle schools, and eight elementary schools. Until 2019, the district had two choice high schools: Riverpoint Academy, a project-based STEAM+ high school, and M.E.A.D., an alternative high school. In 2019, facing financial and political pressure, the district closed both schools.

The Mead School District comprises a significant portion of northern Spokane County stretching from Mount Spokane in the east, near the Idaho state line, to the Stevens County line in the west. The community of Mead gave its name to Mead High School in neighboring Fairwood, but the school no longer serves the area. Instead, students in Mead attend Mount Spokane High School which is just west of the community on Washington State Route 206.

Both Mead High School and Mount Spokane High School share a sports facility in Mead called Union Stadium. The facility cost $24 million to complete and was approved in a 2018 bond measure. Completed in 2020, the 4,500 seat facility is home to the football teams for both high schools in the Mead School District, and is a replacement for Joe Albi Stadium in Spokane which previously hosted the two programs.
