= Nevada Heights, Spokane =

Nevada Heights
- Spokane Neighborhood
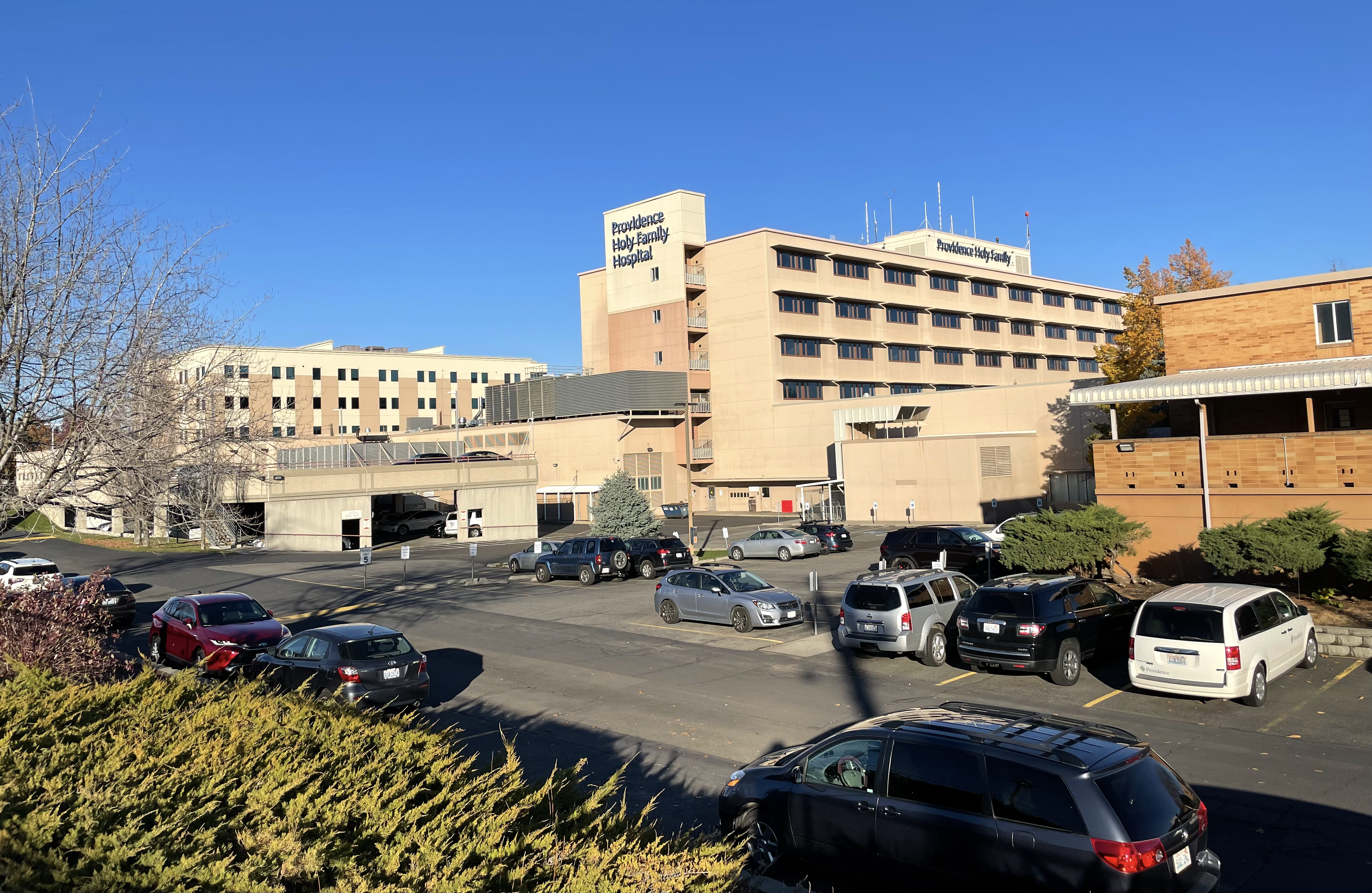
- Holy Family Hospital in Nevada Heights

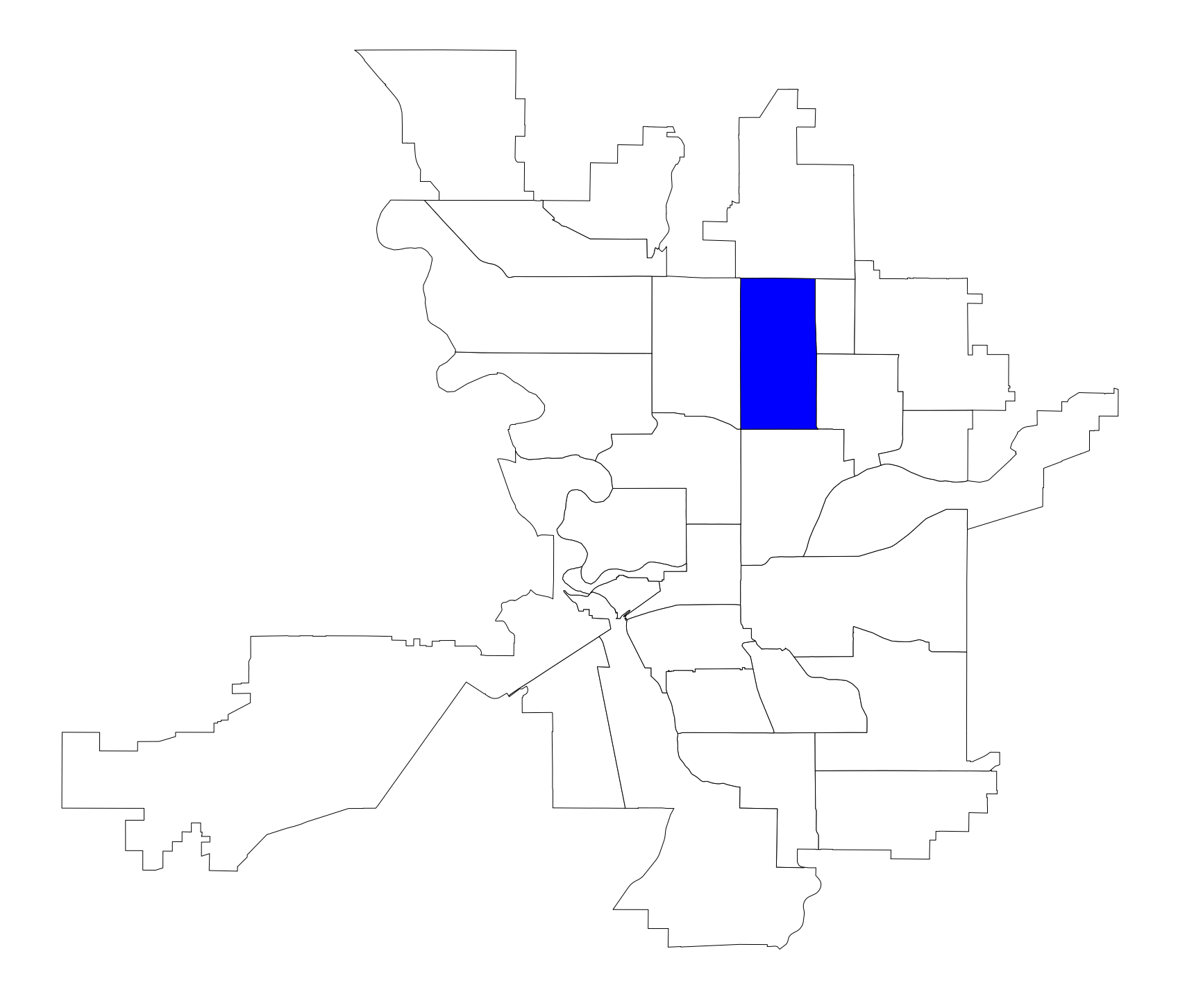
- Location within the city of Spokane
- Coordinates: 47°42′02.3″N 117°23′42.4″W
- Country: United States
- State: Washington
- County: Spokane
- City: Spokane

Population (2017)
  - Total: 13,750

Demographics 2017
  - White: 79.8%
  - Latino: 8.1%
  - Asian: 5.1%
  - American Indian/Alaska Native: 3.4%
  - Black: 3.1%
- Time zone: UTC-8 (PST)
  - Summer (DST): UTC-7 (PDT)
- ZIP Codes: 99207, 99208
- Area code: 509

Nevada Heights is a neighborhood in Spokane, Washington, located on the north side of the city. Its southern border is atop a bluff that runs east–west across the north side of the city, which gives the neighborhood its name. Nevada Street, a major north–south arterial, runs through the neighborhood. The neighborhood is largely residential, but also home to large retail districts, medical facilities, schools and parks. Being surrounded by the city of Spokane on all sides, the neighborhood is well integrated into urban area.

== History ==
The Spokane people have lived in what is now Nevada Heights for hundreds of years prior to the arrival of European settlers.

With the arrival of pioneers and settlers in the 1880s, development began in the southern areas of Nevada Heights. Originally known as Lidgerwood Park, after John and Harriet Lidgerwood, early settlers who purchased and subdivided the land in the area, development began in 1889. Along with the Lidgerwoods, Patrick and Ida Byrne and Chester and Beatrice Glass were early developers in the Nevada Heights neighborhood. Byrne and Glass Parks bear their names to this day. Chester Glass' City Park Transit Company brought a streetcar line to Lidgerwood Park in 1890. To help spur development, 150 lots were auctioned off in the neighborhood as part of a celebration of the line's arrival.

The area south of Empire Avenue was annexed into the city of Spokane in 1891 and the rest of the neighborhood was annexed in 1907. By 1923, two streetcar lines served the neighborhood. One along Addison Street and the other along Nevada Street, both terminating around Rowan Avenue.

Development expanded northward over the years as the population of the city increased. The area south of Wellesley was developed mostly between 1910 and 1950. Between Wellesley and Francis Avenue development began during the post-World War II housing boom and was filled in by the 1960s. The shopping center that became NorthTown Mall was initially developed in the early-1950s with an Albertsons Supermarket. The "NorthTown" name was applied to the shopping center in 1955 and large department stores such as Sears and The Crescent were built on the site, opening in 1962. In 1983 the mall was converted into an enclosed, single building structure.

The neighborhood used to be called Nevada/Lidgerwood and extend beyond Francis Avenue in the north all the way to the city limits. In 2016, the city split the Nevada/Lidgerwood at Francis Avenue, with the area to the north becoming the Shiloh Hills neighborhood and the area to the south becoming Nevada Heights.

== Geography ==
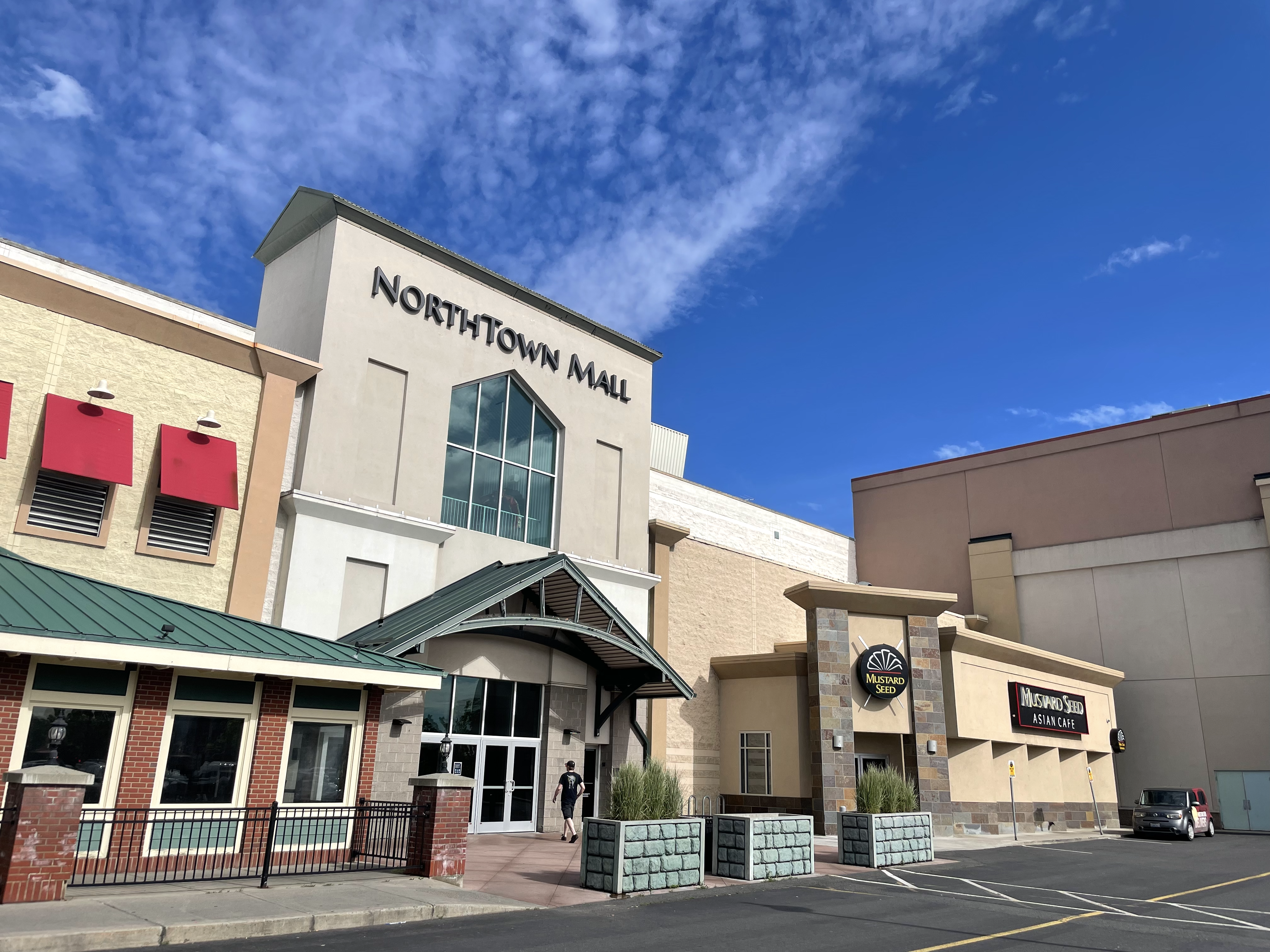
NorthTown Mall west entrance

Nevada Heights is located on the northeast side of Spokane. The rectangular neighborhood is bounded by Division Street to the east, the city's main north–south thoroughfare, Francis Avenue on the north, a major east–west thoroughfare across the north side, Perry Street on the east and Euclid Avenue on the south. The southern border runs along a hillside that climbs between 40 and 50 feet from the lower elevations to the south. Beyond the hillside, however, Nevada Heights' terrain is quite flat, though it rises slightly to the north.

Most of the neighborhood is zoned as single family residential, but it is also home to some important commercial and retail districts. The entire length of Division Street and Francis Avenue through Nevada Lidgerwood are zoned for commercial and retail uses. There are four neighborhood retail zones along Nevada Street at Bridgeport, Empire, Wellesley and Rowan Avenues.

NorthTown Mall, an indoor shopping mall, takes up eight square blocks at Division and Wellesley. Four blocks to the north, at Division and Rowan, is another eight square block area home to a large strip mall along Division and the Providence Holy Family Hospital campus in the four blocks on the east. These are the only notable deviations from the city's street grid in the neighborhood.

== Education ==
Four schools are located in Nevada Heights, three public and one private. The public schools are part of Spokane Public Schools. The private Gonzaga Prep high school campus is located mostly in the neighboring Logan neighborhood, but extends into Nevada Heights in the far southeast of the neighborhood.

Longfellow Elementary, located in the southern half of the neighborhood, serves the southeastern quarter of the Nevada Heights. Willard Elementary, in the adjacent North Hill neighborhood serves the southwestern portion of Nevada Heights. Lidgerwood Elementary, located in the northern half of the neighborhood, serves the northwestern area of Nevada Heights. The northeastern area is served by Willard Elementary in the adjacent Willard neighborhood. Lidgerwood and Whitman feed into Garry Middle School, which is located in the northern half of the neighborhood. Longfellow feeds into Shaw Middle School, located in the neighborhing Bemiss neighborhood. Willard feeds into Glover Middle School in the Audubon/Downriver neighborhood. Garry and Shaw feed into Rogers High School. Glover feeds into North Central High School.

== Demographics ==
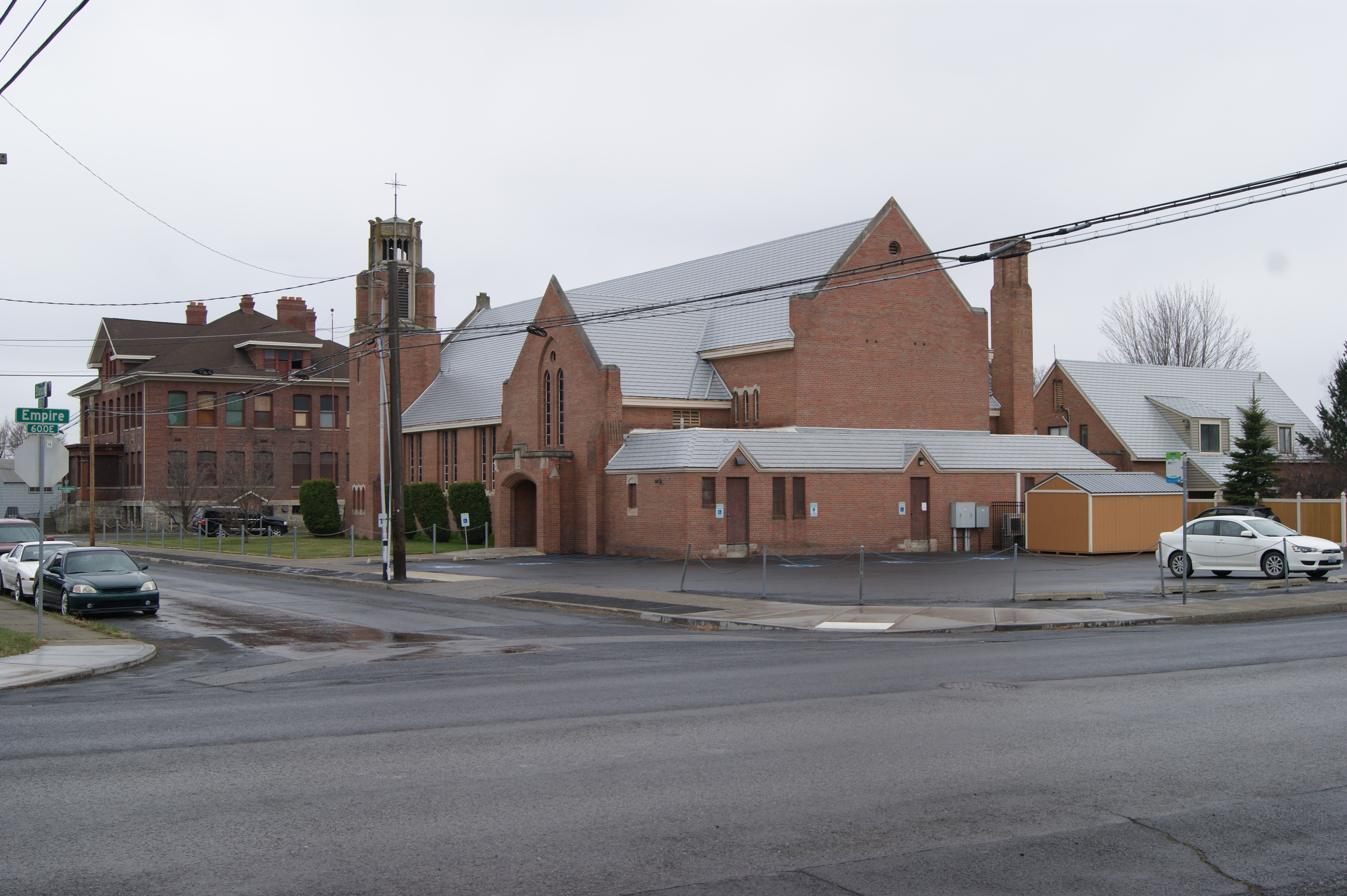
St. Francis Xavier Parish

As of 2017, there were 13,750 residents in the neighborhood across 5,502 households, of which 51.1% earned less than $35,000 per year. 46.1% of households were rented, compared to 45.3% citywide. 27.7% of the residents were aged 19 or younger, compared to 21.9% citywide. Those over 65 made up 10.6% of the population, compared to 14.5% citywide. The median household income was $34,401, compared to $44,768 citywide. 13.1% of the population had a bachelor's degree or higher, while 33.2% had at most a high school diploma. The unemployment rate was 7.8% compared to 6.5% citywide. 84.7% of students qualify for free or reduced lunch, compared to 54.5% citywide.

== Transportation ==
=== Highway ===
- - U.S. 2 - to Newport (north) and Spokane (south)

U.S. 2 passes north–south as the western boundary of Nevada Heights along Division Street.

- - U.S. 395 - to Colville (north) and Spokane (south)

U.S. 395 passes north–south as the western boundary of Nevada Heights along Division Street.

- - State Route 291 - to Tumtum (north) and Spokane (south)

State Route 291 runs west along Francis Avenue from its southern terminus at Division Street in the extreme northwest corner of Nevada Heights.

=== Surface Streets ===
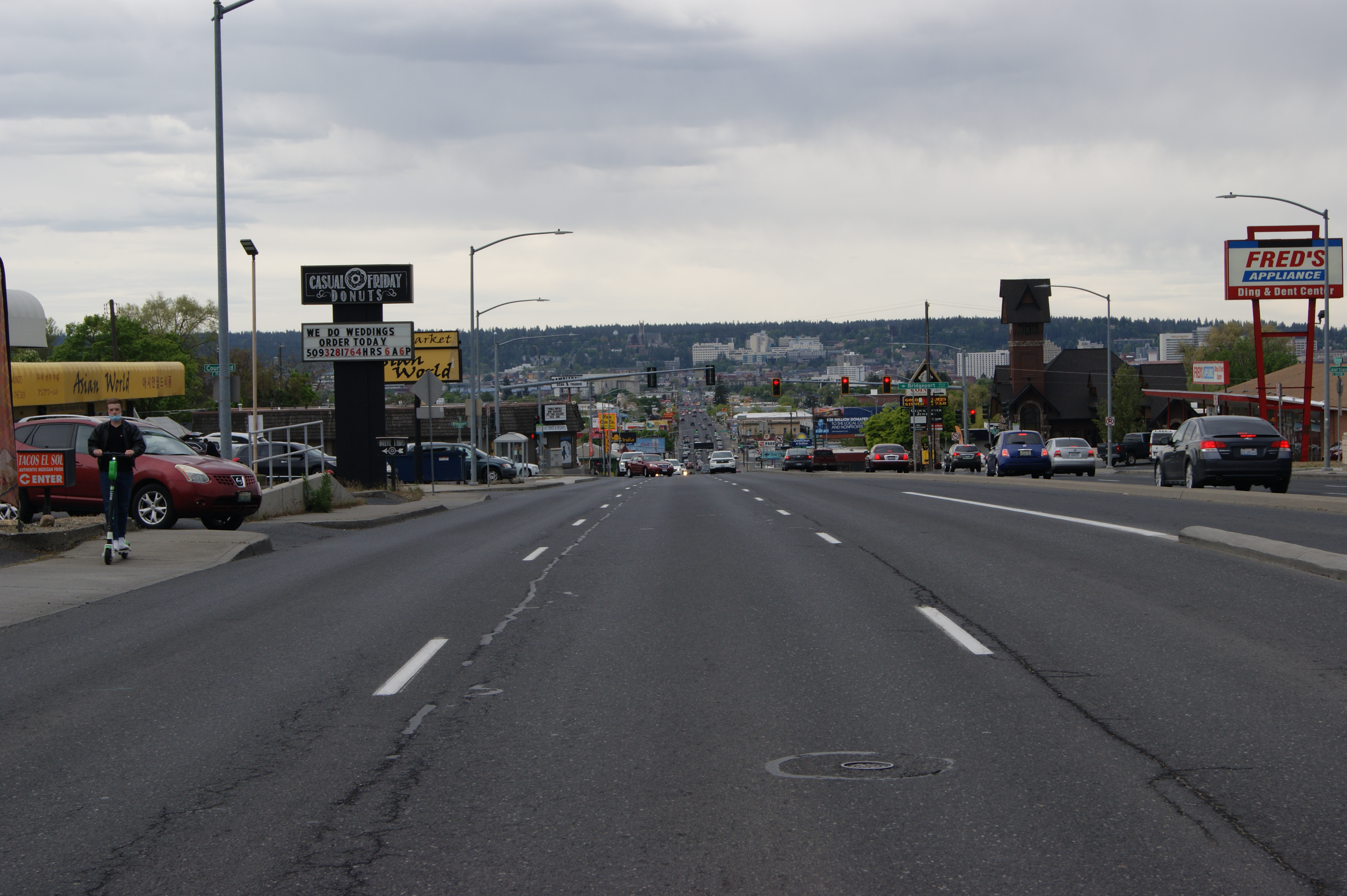
Division Street looking south, Nevada Heights is on the left.

Nevada Heights is well integrated into the city's street grid, and almost all of the neighborhood is laid out accordingly. Division Street carries U.S. Route 2 and U.S. Route 395 through the neighborhood, but it is not a limited access highway. Division and Nevada Streets are major north–south thoroughfares classified as principal arterials by the city. Francis and Wellesley Avenues are major east–west thoroughfares also classified as principal arterials. Addison Street, Empire Avenue and Rowan Avenue are classified as minor arterials. Euclid Avenue, Lidgerwood Street and Perry Street are considered major collectors, while Central and Queen Avenues are considered minor collectors. The rest of the streets in Nevada Heights are local access.

Bicycles are prohibited on Division Street through Nevada Heights. There is a dedicated bike lane along Addison Street, which parallels Division three blocks to the east. Central and Rowan Avenues do not have dedicated bike lanes, but are considered shared roadway bike routes.

=== Public Transit ===
The Spokane Transit Authority, the region's public transportation provider, serves Nevada Heights with five fixed schedule bus lines.

| Route | Termini | | | Service operation and notes | Streets traveled |
|---|---|---|---|---|---|
| 25; Division | Downtown Spokane; STA Plaza | ↔ | Fairwood; Hastings Park and Ride | High-frequency route | Division |
| 33; Wellesley | Spokane Community College; SCC Transit Center | ↔ | Spokane Falls Community College; Spokane Falls Station | High-frequency route | Wellesley |
| 26; Lidgerwood | Downtown Spokane; STA Plaza | ↔ | Shiloh Hills; Northpointe Shopping Center | Basic-frequency route | Nevada, Empire, Addison, Wellesley, Lidgerwood |
| 27; Hillyard | Downtown Spokane; STA Plaza | ↔ | Balboa/South Indian Trail; Five Mile Park & Ride | Basic-frequency route; Downtown Spokane via Hillyard | Francis |
| 28; Nevada | Downtown Spokane; STA Plaza | ↔ | Country Homes; Whitworth University | Basic-frequency route | Nevada |
