= Five Mile Prairie, Spokane =

Five Mile Prairie
- Spokane Neighborhood
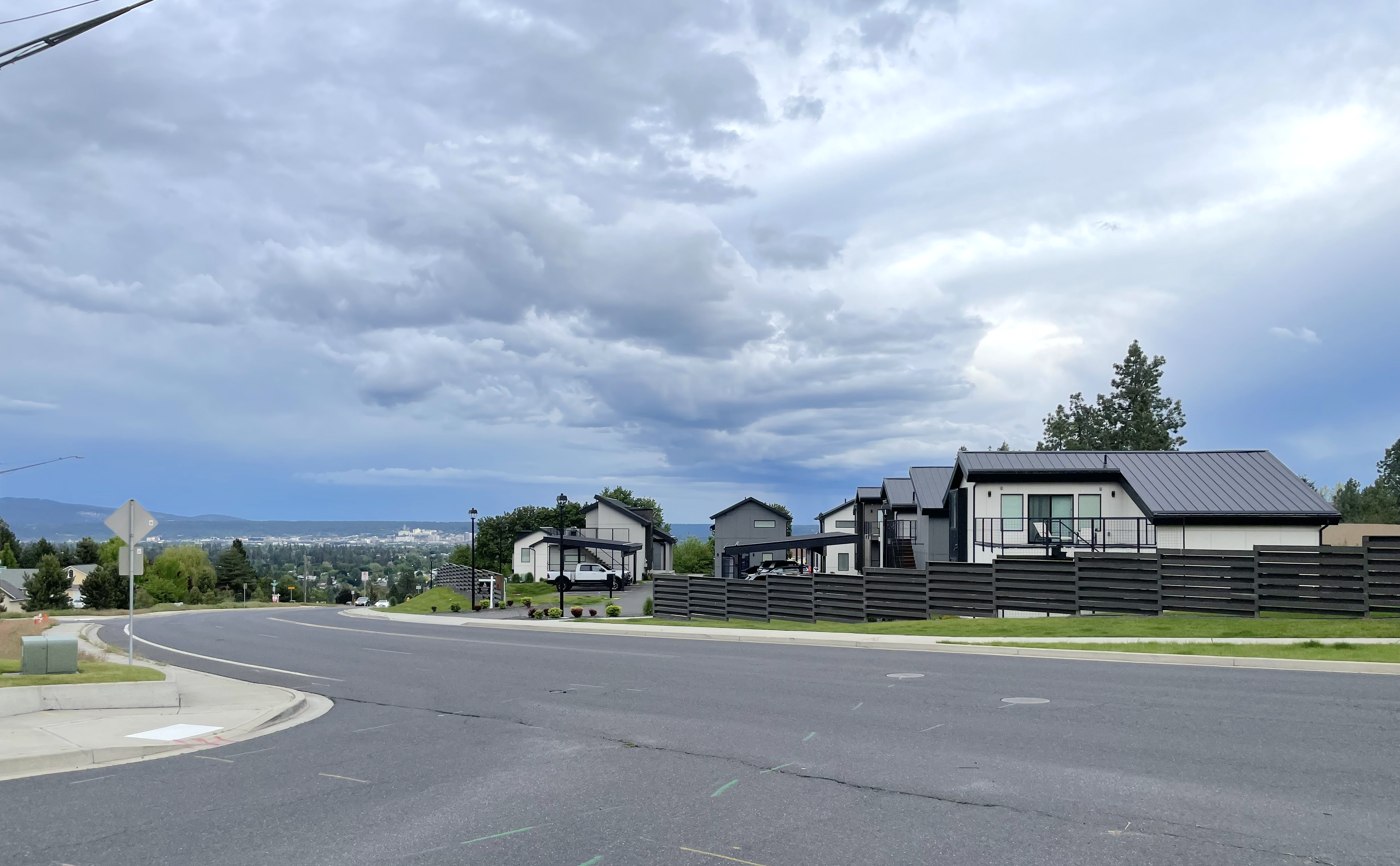
- Crest of Five Mile Road looking south across Spokane

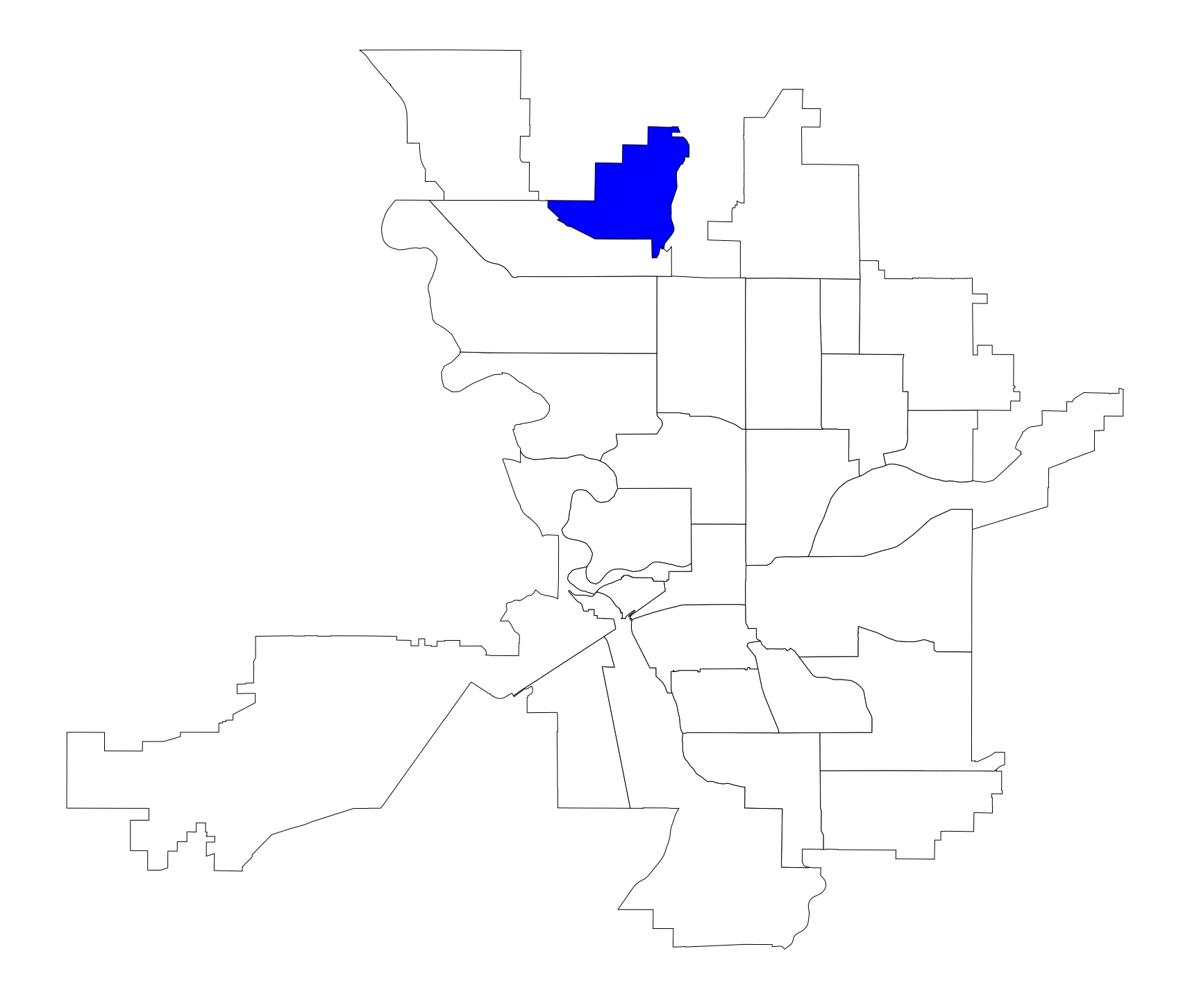
- Location within the city of Spokane
- Coordinates: 47°44′13.1″N 117°27′12.8″W
- Country: United States
- State: Washington
- County: Spokane
- City: Spokane

Population (2017)
  - Total: 4,691

Demographics 2017
  - White: 88.5%
  - Asian: 4.8%
  - Latinx: 4.2%
  - Black or African American: 1.4%
  - American Indian/Alaska Native: 0.8%
- Time zone: UTC-8 (PST)
  - Summer (DST): UTC-7 (PDT)
- Zip codes: 99208
- Area code: 509

Five Mile Prairie is a neighborhood on the far north side of Spokane, Washington. It is located on a prairie of the same name that is atop a bluff on the northern edge of the city of Spokane. It contains the highest elevations on the north side of the city proper. Despite its elevation, however, most of the neighborhood is relatively flat prairie land. Housing development has been replacing the rural land in the neighborhood since the start of the 21st century.

== History ==
The Spokane people inhabited the area that is now known as the Five Mile Prairie for centuries before European settlers arrived. The natives named the prairie "Billymeechum" or "home of the tall grass" after their Chief and have been documented in the area dating as far back as the year 1010; extant petroglyphs remain from their presence on the rock cliffs.

The first settler to inhabit the area was a homesteader named J.F. Strong, who built a house on the prairie in 1879. The Strong House is still inhabited and one of the earliest and best preserved homes in north Spokane County, and is listed on the Spokane Register of Historic Places. The homesteaders primarily cultivated fruit orchards and berries as well as wheat, oats, and barley. A school was built on the prairie in 1901. The name of the prairie was changed to "Five Mile" in 1908, in reference to its distance from the Spokane Falls in Downtown Spokane.

The bulk of the Five Mile Prairie that is within the city limits of Spokane was annexed in 1966. Additional annexations of smaller areas of land subsequently took place in 1975, 1979, 1984, and 1986.

== Geography ==
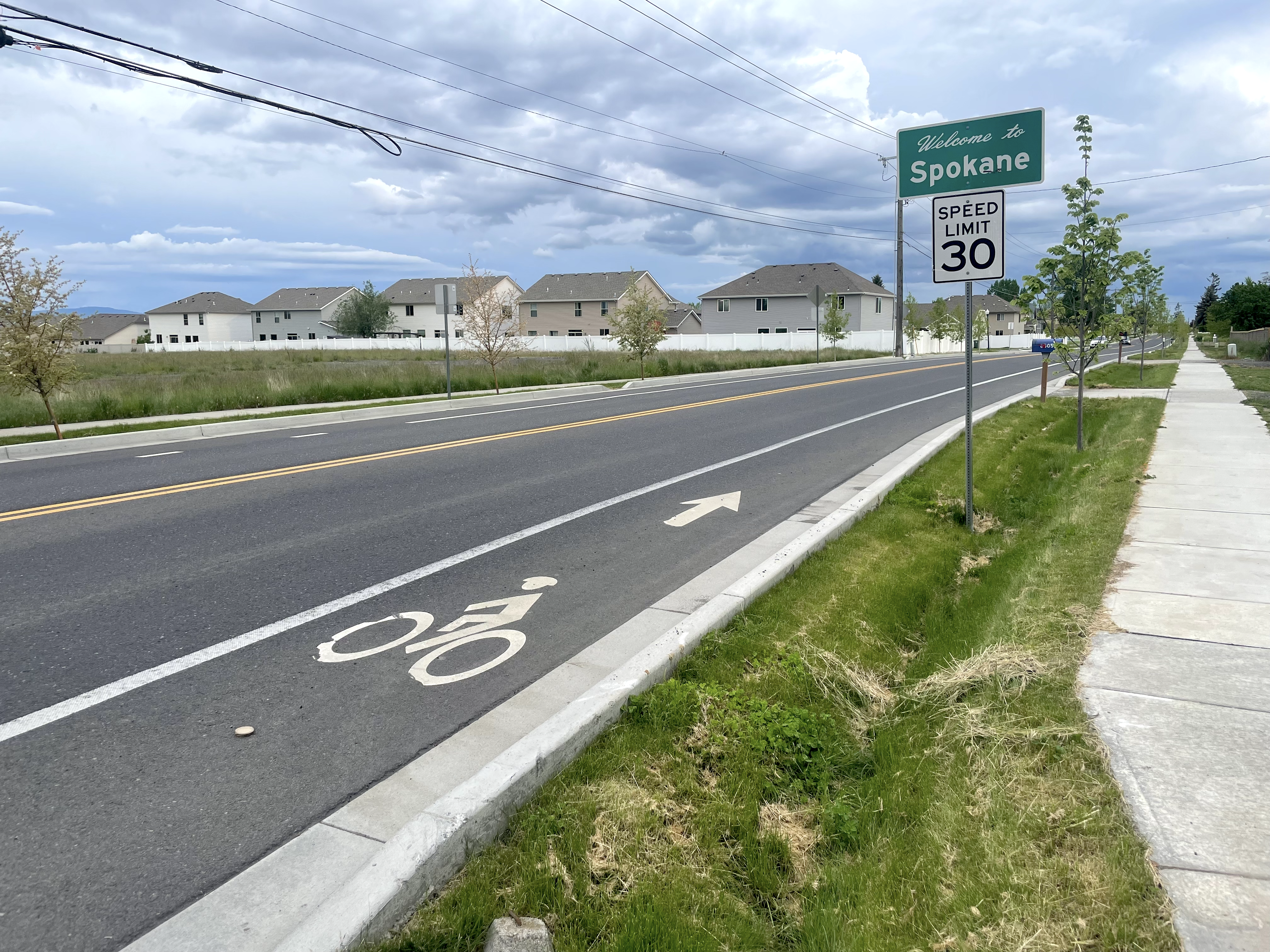
Spokane city limits on Five Mile Road

The Five Mile Prairie is almost an island of the Columbia Plateau surrounded by lowlands cut by the Spokane River and Little Spokane River. Surrounded by cliffs to the north, east, and west, the 3400-acre prairie sits atop a high circular table or mesa of basalt rock looking over the city below. The south-facing slopes of the Five Mile Prairie neighborhood rise about 400 feet. The hill gets higher to the north, reaching more than 400 at its apex in the neighborhood.

Atop Five Mile Prairie, the land is largely flat. Bluffs of a few hundred feet mark all sides of the neighborhood, though some go beyond city limits. To the north, the Little Spokane River runs, and to the south and west, the Spokane River runs.

== Transportation ==
Five Mile Prairie is not served by the region's public transit provider, the Spokane Transit Authority. Though the Five Mile Park & Ride, Country Homes Park & Ride and the Fairwood Park & Ride are all located just below the Five Mile Prairie bluff.

The neighborhood does not conform to the city's street grid. Instead, it takes on a much more suburban approach with winding roads and cul-de-sacs common.

== Demographics ==
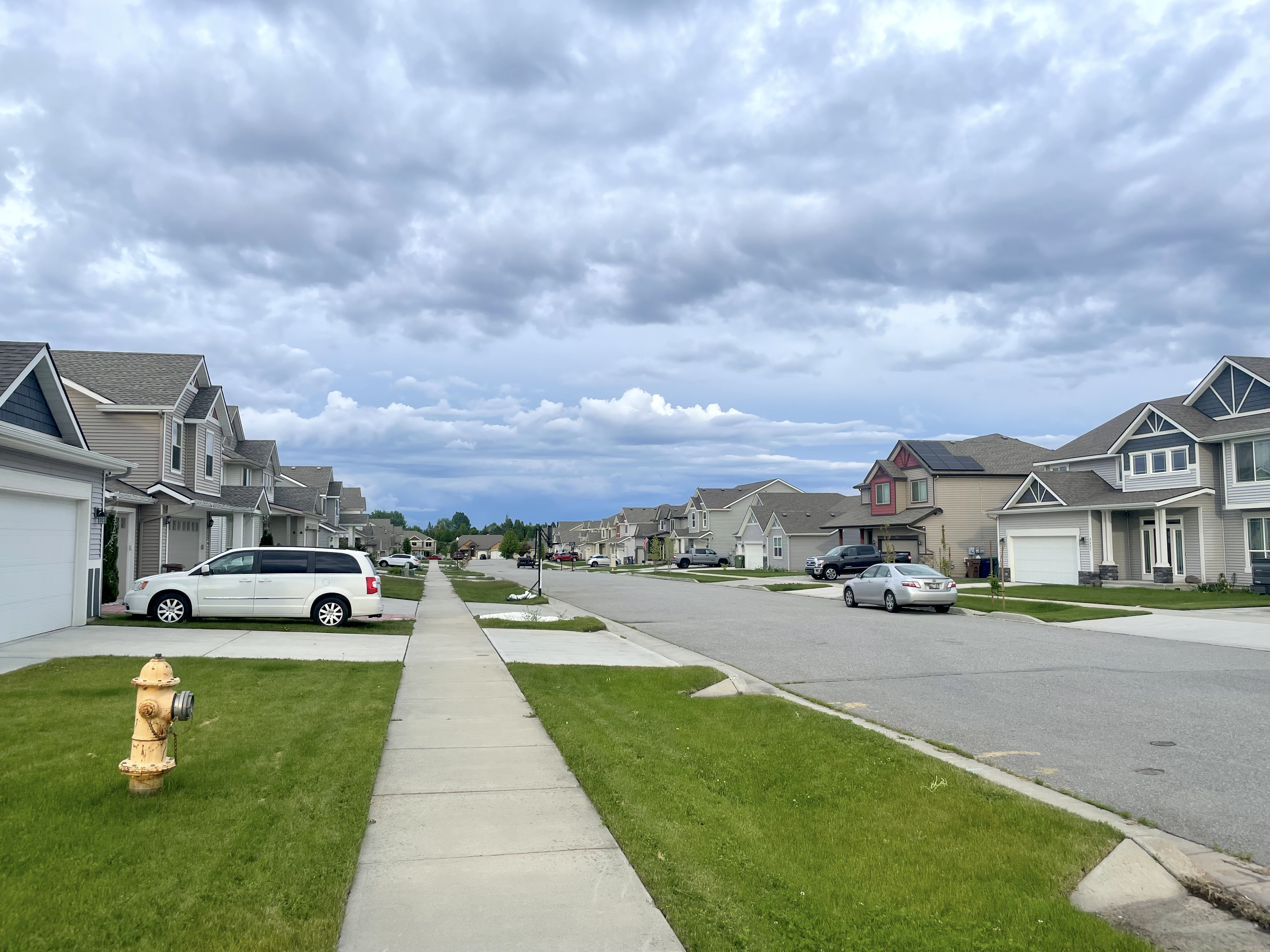
Typical housing development on Five Mile Prairie

As of 2017, there were 4,691 persons living in Five Mile Prairie across 1,524 households. 41.4% of those households had children and 33.9% of the population was 19 years or younger, compared to 21.9% citywide. Rentals make up 11.9% of the households in the neighborhood, compared to 45.3% citywide. Persons of color made up 8.1% of the population compared to 15.1% citywide. The median household income was $93,212, compared to the citywide average of $44,678. 45.1% of the population had a bachelor's degree or higher, compared to 29.5% citywide, and 14.9% had a high school diploma at most, compared to 24.6% citywide. 14.1% of students qualify for free or reduced lunch, compared to 54.5% citywide. 91.9% of residents were born in the United States or its territories. Of those who were not, 13.9% come from Mexico, 13.4% from Iraq, 9.6% from Saudi Arabia and 5.9% from Canada.

== Education ==
While the Five Mile Prairie neighborhood is part of the city of Spokane, like the rest of the prairie it is part of the more suburban Mead School District. The southwestern half of the neighborhood feeds into Skyline Elementary, which is located in the unincorporated northwest of the prairie. The northeastern half feeds into Prairie View Elementary, which is located in the unincorporated northeast of the prairie. Both schools feed into Highland Middle School, also on the northwestern portion of the prairie. The public high school serving the neighborhood is Mead High School, in nearby Fairwood.
