= Mead School District =

School district in Mead, Washington, United States

Address
- 2323 E Farwell Road Mead, Washington, 99021; United States
- Coordinates: 47°46′23″N 117°22′32″W

District information
- Motto: Learn. Lead. Mead.
- Grades: K–12
- Superintendent: Travis Hanson
- NCES District ID: 5304920
- Affiliations: Washington State Office of Superintendent of Public Instruction, U.S. Department of Education

Students and staff
- Enrollment: 10,275 (2021-2022 school year)
- Teachers: 605
- Student–teacher ratio: 16.98 (2021)

Other information
- Website: mead354.org

Mead School District No. 354 is a public School district serving Mead and North Spokane communities for over 100 years. Over 10,000 students attend the 18 schools in the district which consists of two high schools, an alternative high school, a STEM academy, three middle schools, ten elementary schools, and the Mead Education Partnership Program at Five Mile Prairie School House. The Superintendent of the Mead School District is Travis Hanson.

The district includes the census-designated places of Mead, Country Homes, Fairwood, and Green Bluff. It also includes portions of Spokane and Town and Country.

== Schools ==
=== High schools ===
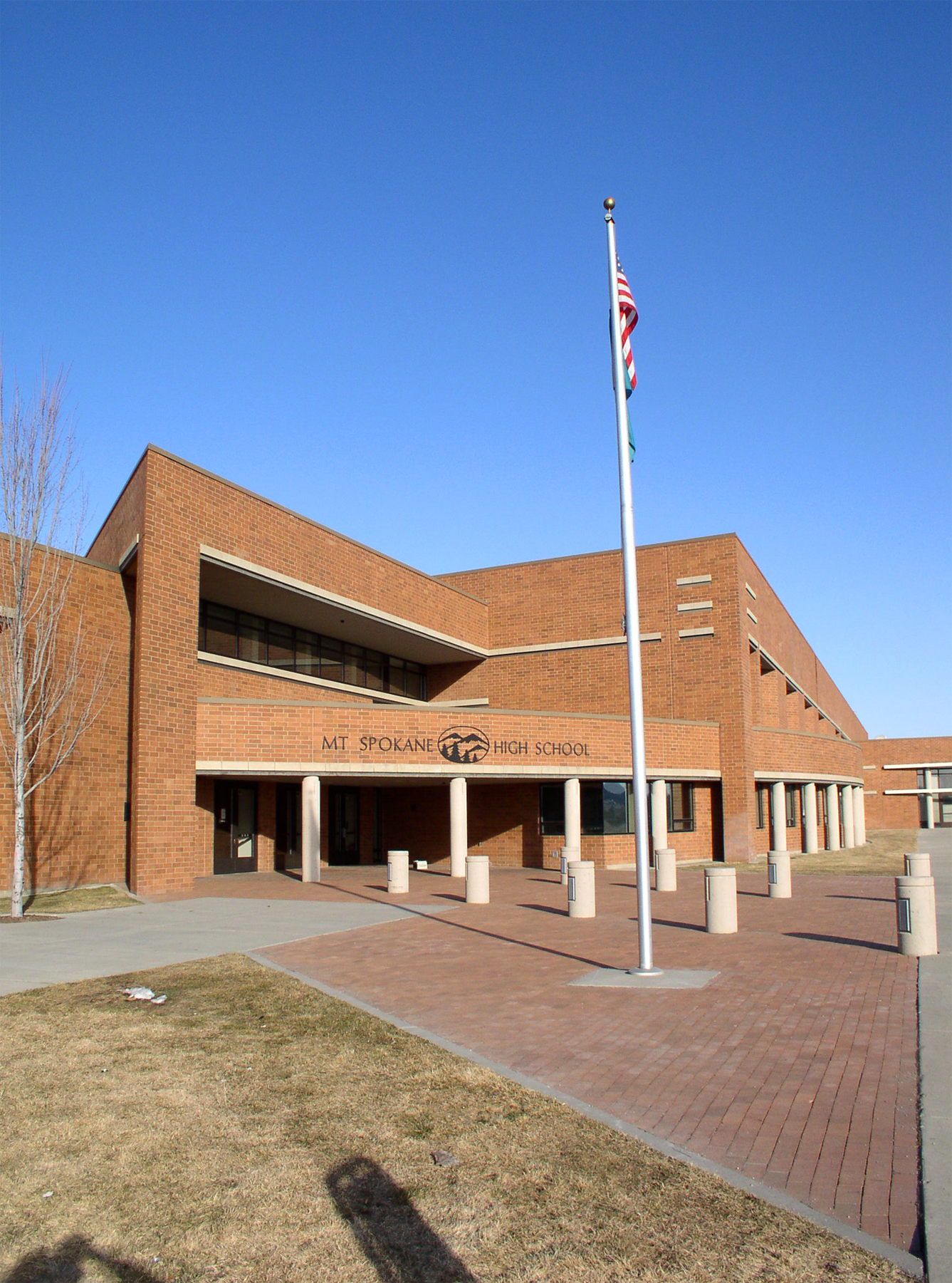
The Mead School District's newest high school, Mt. Spokane High School, built in 1997.

- Mead High School
- Mt. Spokane High School

=== Middle schools ===
- Highland Middle School
- Northwood Middle School
- Mountainside Middle School

=== Elementary schools ===
- Brentwood Elementary School
- Colbert Elementary
- Creekside Elementary
- Evergreen Elementary
- Farwell Elementary
- Meadow Ridge Elementary
- Midway Elementary
- Prairie View Elementary
- Shiloh Hills Elementary
- Skyline Elementary

=== Alternative schools ===
- MEAD Alternative High School was an innovative and award-winning program that affords a small community of selected students a diversity of flexible learning options.

=== Other schools ===
- Five Mile Prairie School House - used by Mead Educational Partnership Program (MEPP). North Star School was affiliated with the Five Mile Prairie School and MEPP.

== 2004 Bond ==
As a result of the $37.7m bond passed by voters in 2004, the Mead School District completed numerous projects to enhance learning district-wide. The enhancements included the installation of Multimedia LCD Projectors in every classroom in the district, wireless Internet access in classrooms, and the purchase of computer equipment.

=== Construction projects ===
Along with the passage of the 2004 bond came several construction projects.

==== Completed projects ====
- Traffic safety/parking improvements at Colbert, Evergreen, and Meadow Ridge Elementary Schools
- Recarpeting of Mead Education Alternative Department Alternative High School
- Northwood Middle School multi-purpose room addition
- Northwood Middle School, Midway Elementary School, and M.E.A.D. security system upgrades
- Renovation of the Five Mile School house
- Prairie View Elementary, the district's eighth elementary school.
- Mountainside Middle School, the district's second middle school.
