= Fairwood, Spokane County, Washington =

Census-designated place in Washington, United States

Fairwood, Washington
- CDP
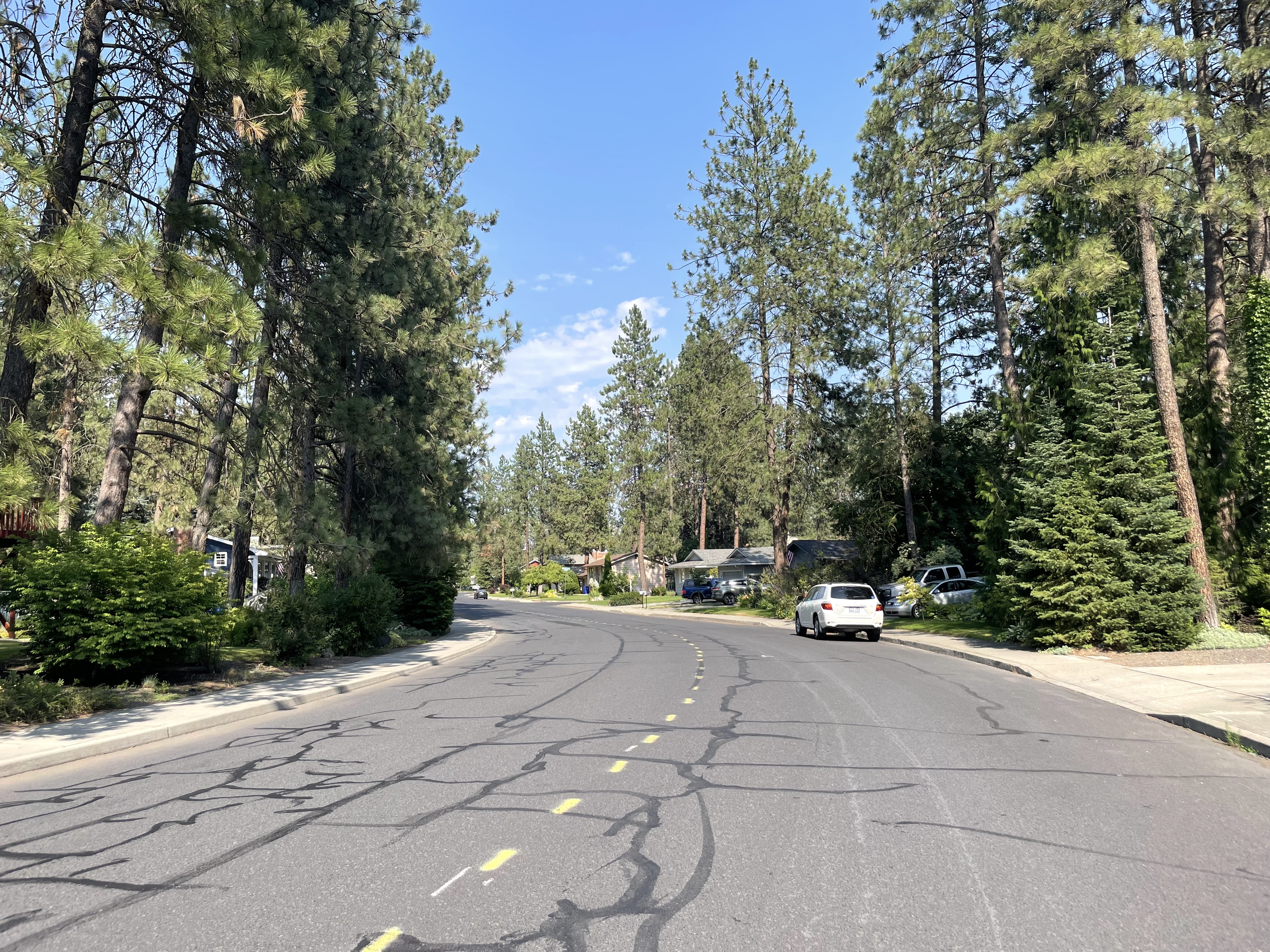
- Typical residential scene along Regina Avenue in Fairwood

- Location of Fairwood, Washington
- Coordinates: 47°46′02″N 117°25′07″W
- Country: United States
- State: Washington
- County: Spokane

Area
  - Total: 3.99 sq mi (10.3 km^{2})
  - Land: 3.99 sq mi (10.3 km^{2})
  - Water: 0.0 sq mi (0 km^{2})
- Elevation: 1,818 ft (554 m)

Population (2020)
  - Total: 10,541
  - Density: 2,639.2/sq mi (1,019.0/km^{2})
- Time zone: UTC-8 (Pacific (PST))
  - Summer (DST): UTC-7 (PDT)
- FIPS code: 53-23165
- GNIS feature ID: 2408106

Fairwood is a census-designated place (CDP) in Spokane County, Washington, United States. The population was 10,541 at the 2020 census.

== Geography ==
According to the United States Census Bureau, the CDP has a total area of 3.6 square miles (9.3 km^{2}), of which, 3.6 square miles (9.3 km^{2}) of it is land and 0.28% is water.

Fairwood is located in a lowland setting along the banks and wetlands of the Little Spokane River. The terrain falls from around 1,900 feet above sea level in the southeast to around 1,580 feet along the Little Spokane. Five Mile Prairie rises to the southwest, with a bluff climbing from the valley floor along basalt, rising almost vertically in places above Fairwood and the Little Spokane Valley before cresting at the elevation of the Columbia Plateau. To the north of Fairwood rise foothills of the Selkirk Range of the Columbia Mountains. To the south the city of Spokane sprawls into Fairwood, with the terrain sloping up as it heads into the city.

== Demographics ==
Historical population
Census	Pop.	Note	%±
1980	5,337		—
1990	5,807		8.8%
2000	6,764		16.5%
2020	10,541		—
U.S. Decennial Census; 1960 1970 1980 1990; 2000 2010

Fairwood first appeared as a census designated place in the 1980 U.S. census.

=== 2020 census ===
At the 2020 census, there were 10,541 people living within the CDP across 3,872 households. As of subsequent estimates by the Census Bureau from July 1, 2021, the racial makeup of the CDP was 90.9% White alone, 0.1% African American alone, 1.5% Native American alone, 3.8% Asian alone, 0.0% Pacific Islander alone, and 3.2% from two or more races. Hispanic or Latino of any race were 3.7% of the population.

=== 2000 census ===
As of the census of 2000, there were 6,764 people, 2,474 households, and 1,964 families residing in the CDP. The population density was 1,883.0 people per square mile (727.5/km^{2}). There were 2,560 housing units at an average density of 712.7/sq mi (275.3/km^{2}). The racial makeup of the CDP was 94.40% White, 0.52% African American, 0.93% Native American, 1.63% Asian, 0.18% Pacific Islander, 0.47% from other races, and 1.88% from two or more races. Hispanic or Latino of any race were 2.23% of the population.

There were 2,474 households, out of which 37.9% had children under the age of 18 living with them, 68.8% were married couples living together, 8.8% had a female householder with no husband present, and 20.6% were non-families. 17.2% of all households were made up of individuals, and 9.0% had someone living alone who was 65 years of age or older. The average household size was 2.72 and the average family size was 3.07.

In the CDP, the age distribution of the population shows 27.7% under the age of 18, 7.8% from 18 to 24, 22.9% from 25 to 44, 28.7% from 45 to 64, and 12.9% who were 65 years of age or older. The median age was 40 years. For every 100 females, there were 91.1 males. For every 100 females age 18 and over, there were 89.6 males.

The median income for a household in the CDP was $59,682, and the median income for a family was $66,226. Males had a median income of $47,454 versus $31,836 for females. The per capita income for the CDP was $26,378. About 2.6% of families and 6.3% of the population were below the poverty line, including 9.0% of those under age 18 and 7.1% of those age 65 or over.

== Education ==
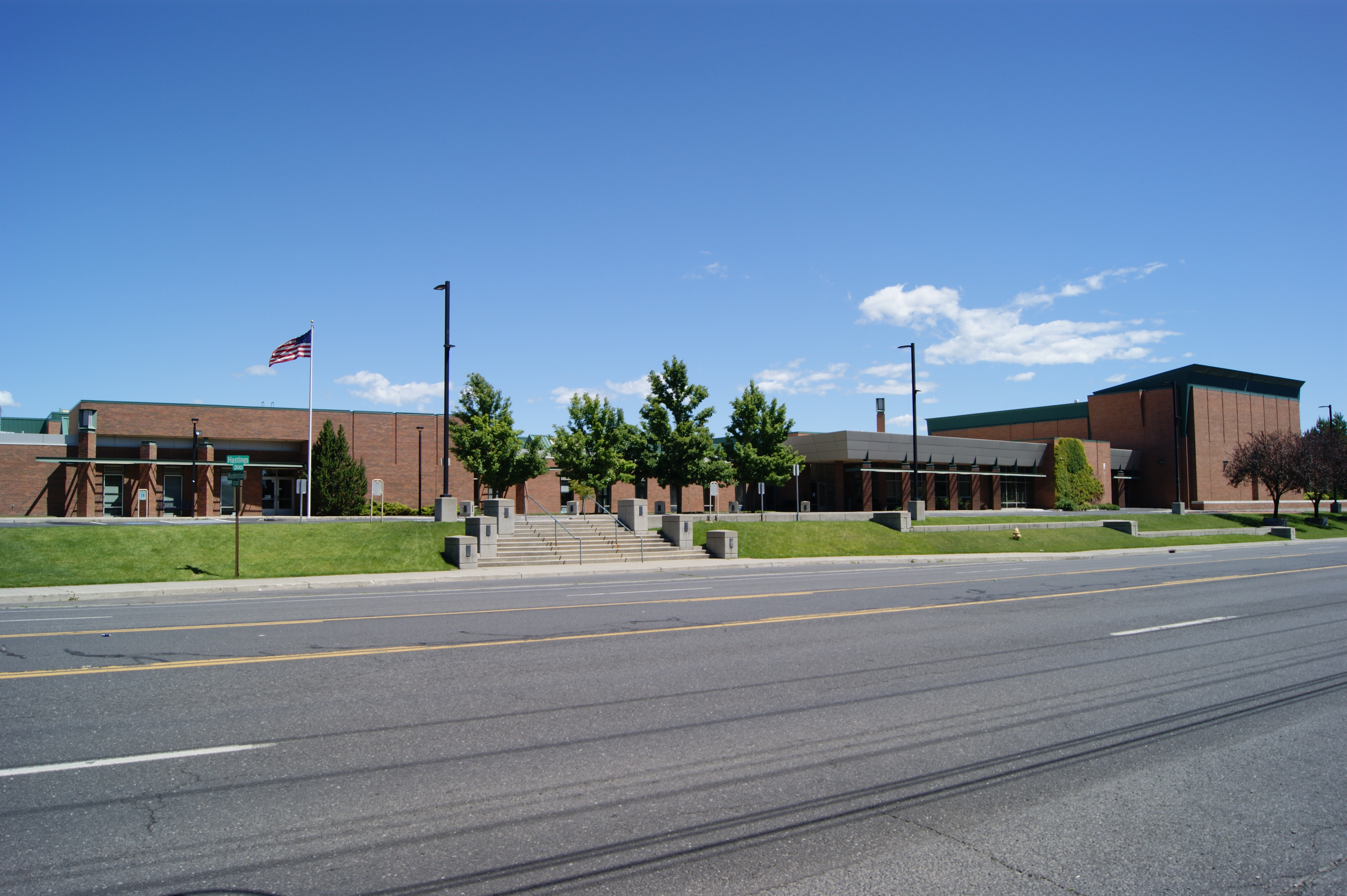
Mead High School on Hastings Road

Fairwood is located in the Mead School District.

It is home to Brentwood Elementary School and Mead High School, and students in the community attend Northwood Middle School in adjacent unincorporated Spokane County. Mead High School serves the area despite not serving the nearby community of Mead, for which it was originally named. Mead High School is located on Hastings Road in the center of the Fairwood CDP. Brentwood Elementary serves the community west of Division Street and Farwell Elementary serves the area east of Division. Whitworth University is located immediately south of Fairwood, with the CDP's southern boundary running along the campus boundary.

== Public Transit ==
Fairwood is served by the Spokane area's public transit provider, the Spokane Transit Authority, which runs two fixed-route bus lines through the CDP.

Route	Termini			Service operation and notes	Streets traveled
25; Division	Downtown Spokane; STA Plaza	↔	Fairwood; Hastings Park and Ride	High-frequency route	Newport Highway, Hawthorne, Division
124; North Express	Downtown Spokane; STA Plaza	↔	Fairwood; Hastings Park and Ride	Express route during peak weekday hours	Waikiki, Wall, Monroe
