= Ninth Avenue Historic District =

Historic district in Spokane, Washington

- U.S. National Register of Historic Places
- U.S. Historic district
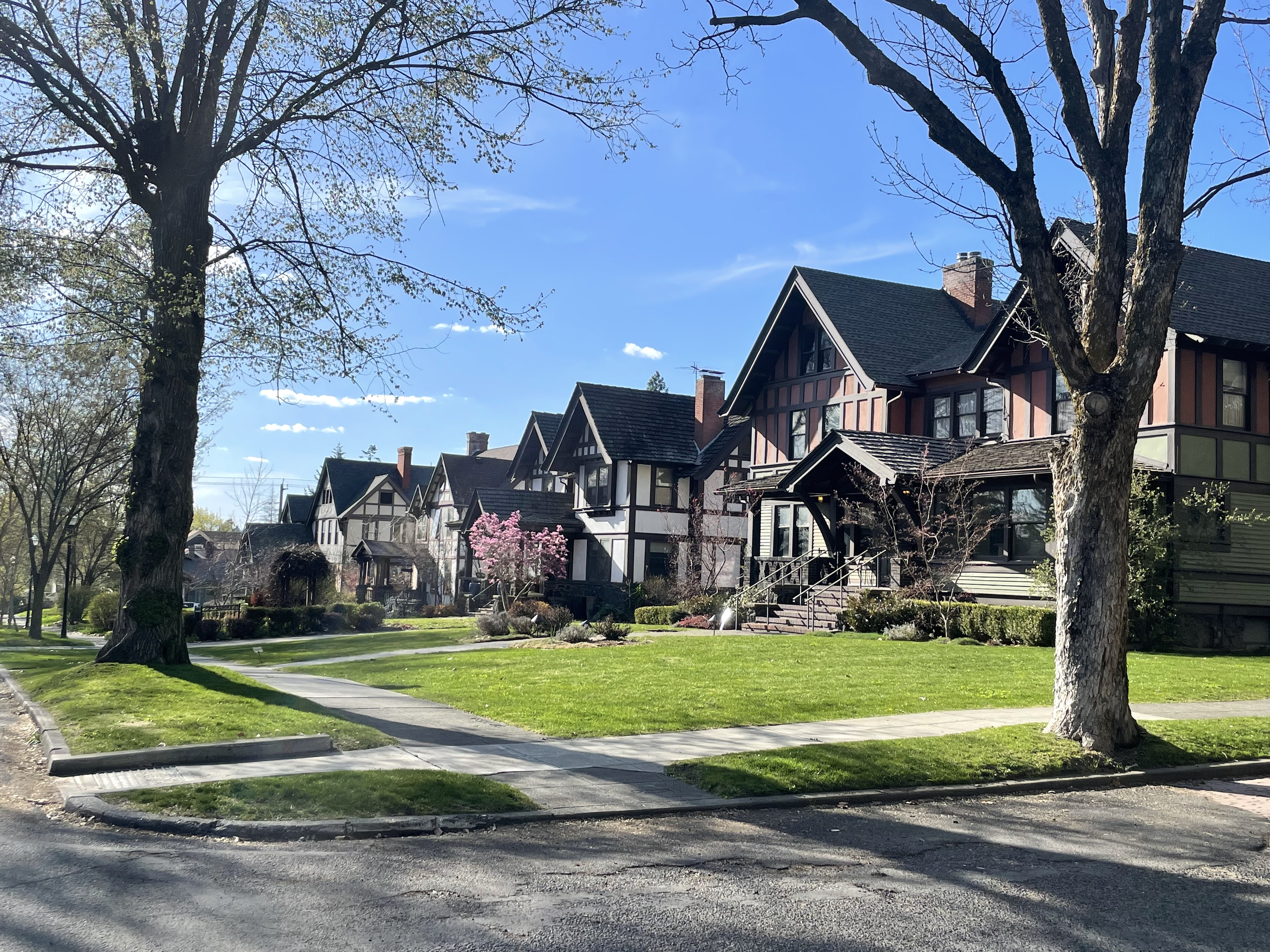
- Tudor Revival homes on Ninth Avenue

- Location within Spokane riverfront area Location within Washington (state) Location within the United States
- Location: Cliff/Cannon, Spokane, Washington, United States
- Coordinates: 47°38′50.6″N 117°26′05.6″W
- Area: 72 acres (29 ha)
- Built: 1892-1940
- Architect: Multiple
- Architectural style: Queen Anne, Colonial Revival, Classical Revival, American Foursquare, Tudor Revival and Bungalow
- NRHP reference No.: 94000679
- Added to NRHP: 1994

The Ninth Avenue Historic District is a National Register of Historic Places (NRHP) listed historic district located along and around Ninth Avenue in the Cliff/Cannon neighborhood of Spokane, Washington. It stretches from Monroe Street on the east to Chestnut Street on the west, running the length of Ninth Avenue and extending to include portions of Eighth, 10th and 11th Avenues, mostly in the western half of the district.

A residential area, the district was built to house many of early-Spokane's elite residents in grand Queen Anne, Colonial Revival, Classical Revival, American Foursquare and Tudor Revival homes, along with numerous Bungalow homes for middle-class residents. The area was developed largely between 1892 and 1940, with limited modern incursions in the form of apartments having been built in the decades since. It retains its residential character to this day, though many of the large single-family homes have been converted into multi-unit dwellings.

Located roughly one mile from the heart of Downtown Spokane, the Ninth Avenue Historic District is an example of an early residential development in Spokane, free of commercial incursions. Notable architects including Kirtland Cutter, Willis Ritchie, Julius Zittel, Loren L. Rand, John K. Dow and Albert Held designed homes in the district.

In the present day, the area is part of the Cliff/Cannon neighborhood of Spokane, stretching from the historic Cannon's Addition in the west over to Monroe Street, a major arterial extending from the north side of Spokane through downtown and up onto the South Hill, in the east. It makes up part of what is now known as the "lower South Hill" for its location near the bottom of a hill which rises abruptly from the downtown area to the north. The terrain surrounding the Ninth Avenue Historic District falls off dramatically on the west to a valley containing Latah Creek, which marks a natural western boundary, and drops to the north to the valley of the Spokane River and Downtown Spokane in the north, while terrain rises to the west and south as one continues up into the South Hill residential area of Spokane.

== Setting ==
The Ninth Avenue Historic District is located, as the name implies, mostly along Ninth Avenue in the Cliff/Cannon neighborhood on Spokane's South Hill. It stretches from Monroe Street on the east, an arterial which connects the district with residential areas to the south of the district, to Downtown and the north side of the city beyond, to Chestnut Street on the east where the South Hill falls off dramatically into the valley cut by Latah Creek and the Latah/Hangman neighborhood. The district also includes portions of Eighth Avenue between Monroe and Cedar Streets in the east and along Eighth Avenue between Elm and Chestnut Streets in the west, 10th Avenue between Cherry and Cannon Streets in the east, and 11th Avenue between Maple and Elm Streets in the east. Aside from Monroe Street on the west and the couplet of Maple and Walnut Streets in the middle of the district, which are each major north–south thoroughfares, the roads in the district can be described as residential side-streets.

The terrain within the district is mostly flat, though it trends higher as one heads east, but the surrounding terrain is considerably more varied. Immediately north of the district the elevation falls rapidly into the valley of the Spokane River and Downtown Spokane while the western edge of the district lies along a nearly 200 foot drop down to the valley of Latah Creek. Terrain gradually rises to the south and east, with a more dramatic rise in the east occurring just outside of the district beyond Monroe Street.

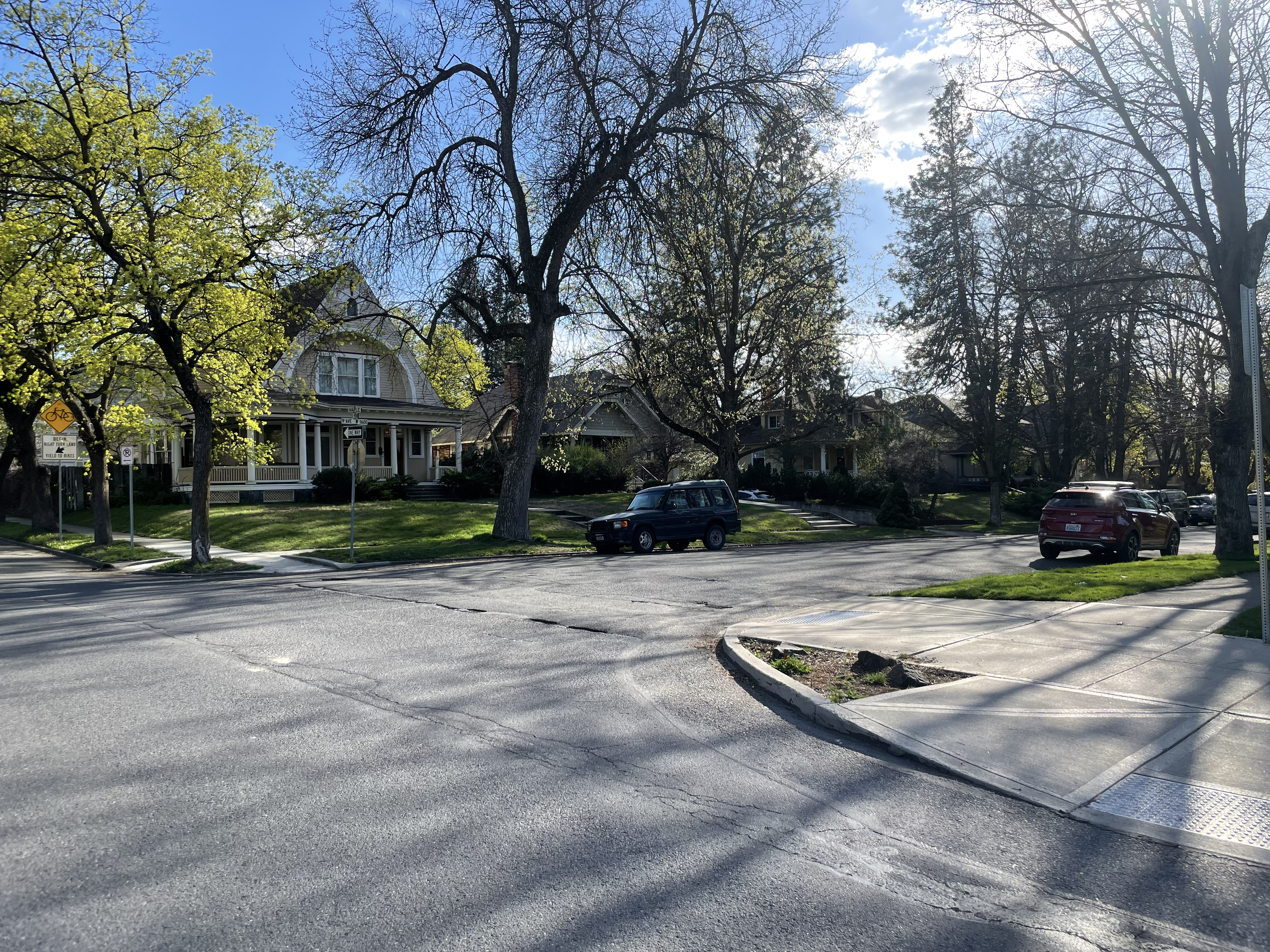
Ninth and Maple showing the variety of trees in the district

Platted on a grid layout, streets in the district are almost entirely uniform in a north–south and east–west manner, though this grid breaks down just beyond the fringes of the district to the west and east as the terrain changes. It is well connected to neighboring parts of Spokane including downtown to the north and the rest of Cliff/Cannon and the South Hill to the south.

The Ninth Avenue Historic District boasts a strong tree canopy of both planted deciduous street trees lining many of the area roads as well as trees planted or developed around on private property. Many properties contain vestige ponderosa pine or Douglas fir trees native to the area. The basalt rock outcroppings around which these trees once grew have largely been built over in the district, though vestiges of the rock's presence can be seen as a building material in many of the homes and on outcroppings in adjacent areas.

== History ==
The area that is now the Ninth Avenue Historic District was inhabited by the Spokane people for centuries prior to American settlement.

A.M. Cannon, an early settler and developer in the Spokane area who arrived in 1878, platted the area west of Cedar Street to 10th Avenue in 1883. A decade later, during the Panic of 1893, Cannon lost all of his holdings, though his name remains prominent as it is in the official city neighborhood of Cliff/Cannon and on Cannon Street in the west of the district.

Most of the construction in the district took place in the years between Cannon's plat in 1883 and 1920, with the most intense development occurring during the first decade of the 20th century. Spokane's population grew from roughly 30,000 people in 1900 to over 100,000 in 1910. It was during this decade that the city expanded from its original settlement location in what is now Downtown Spokane about a mile to the northeast of the district through Ninth Avenue and up the South Hill. Development in the area was spurred by the establishment of streetcar trolley lines which provided transportation into the city center.

Development of residential areas for the elites of Spokane had been limited largely to the Browne's Addition neighborhood in the city's formative decades of the late 1800s, but by the turn of the century new development was needed to match the pace of population growth. Ninth Avenue, along with other historic districts like the adjacent Marycliff-Cliff Park Historic District and the Corbin Park Historic District on the north side of town, was a beneficiary of this boom. Numerous notable local architects including Loren L. Rand, Willis A. Ritchie, Cutter and Malmgren, Albert Held, John K. Dow, and Julius Zittel worked to design homes in the district.

Most of the grandest homes were built between 1905 and 1915 and housed some of Spokane's elite, including Mayor James Comstock, financier Alfred Coolidge, and businessman John Sengfelder — whose homes are each also listed on the Spokane Register of Historic Places. Another resident of the district, J. Grier Long, hosted then-President Theodore Roosevelt during a visit to Spokane in 1908. In addition to the wealthy elite of Spokane, the neighborhood housed numerous craftsmen and teachers, creating a varied socio-economic environment which persists to this day.

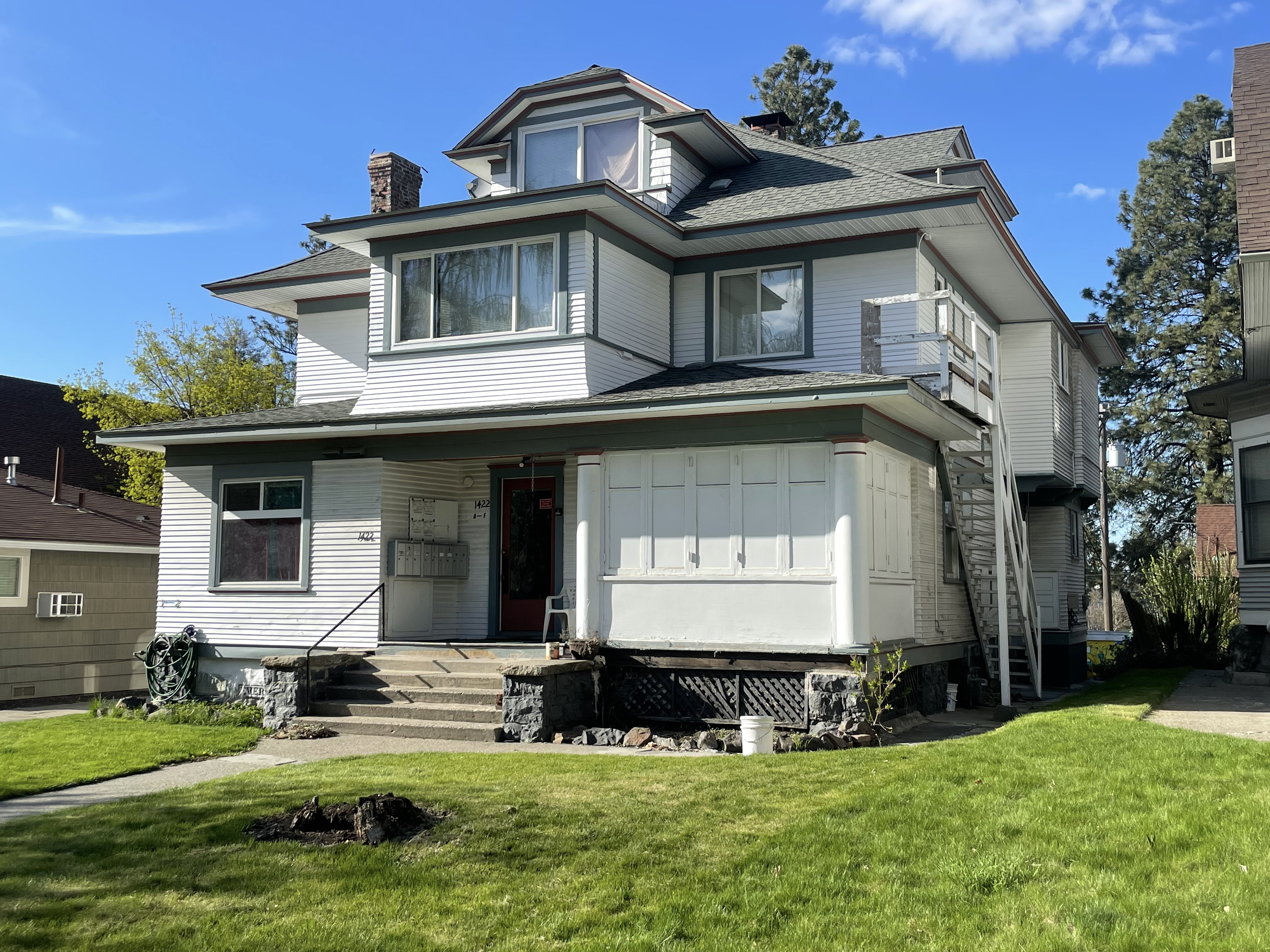
Multi-unit house on Ninth Avenue

In the decades since the neighborhood's complete development, which ended in the early 1920s, there have been some changes to the historic district. Spokane's streetcar system was replaced with busses in 1936, though disused rails are still visible in some roads around the district. Many of the formerly single-family homes have been converted into multi-unit dwellings, and some homes have been demolished to make way for modern apartments or condominiums. In addition to being listed on the National Register of Historic Places in 1994, portions of the district were listed on the local Spokane Register of Historic Places in 2023 as the Cannon Hill Streetcar Historic District.

== Gallery ==
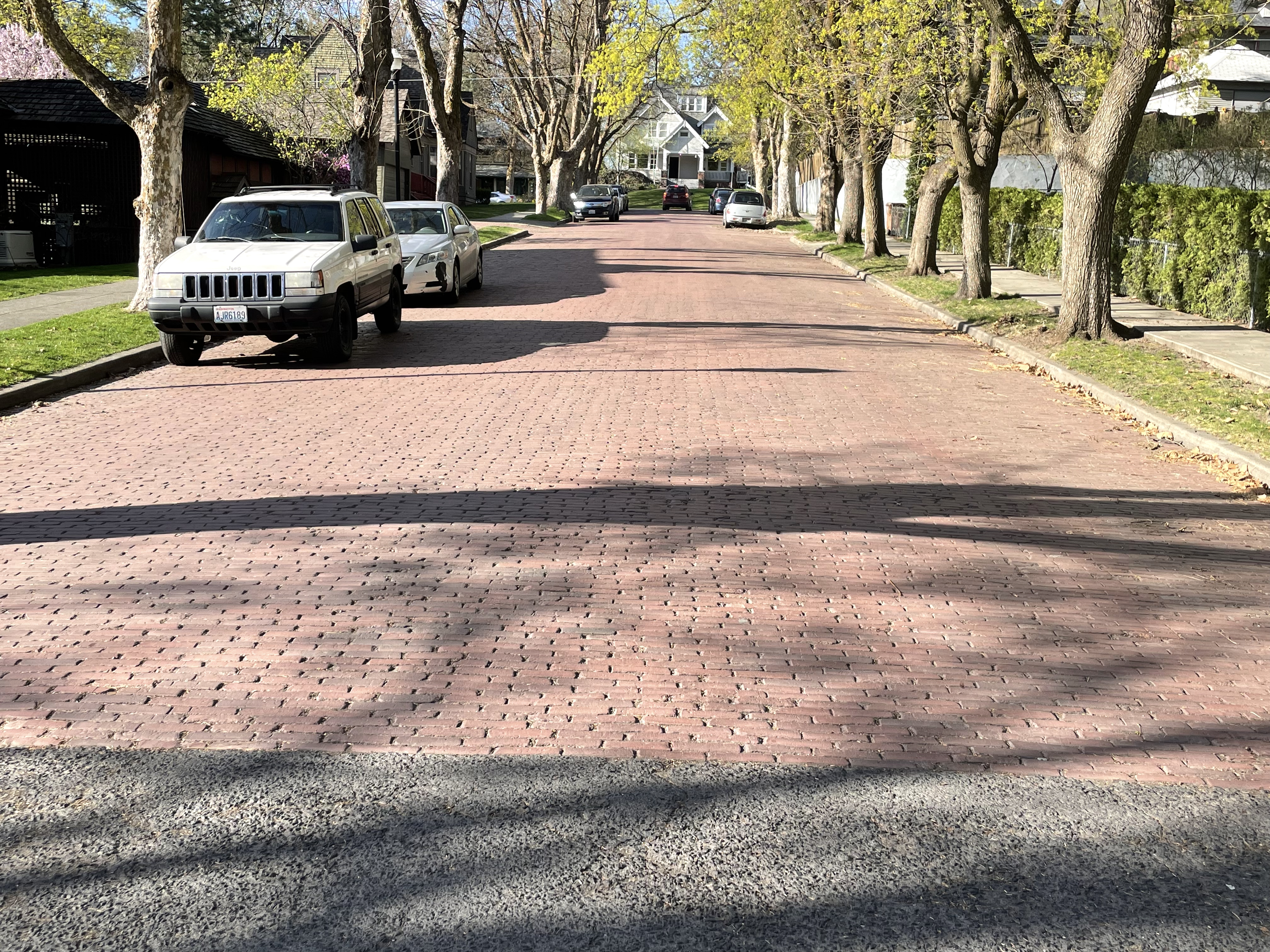
Brick-paved street on Madison St. north of Ninth Ave.

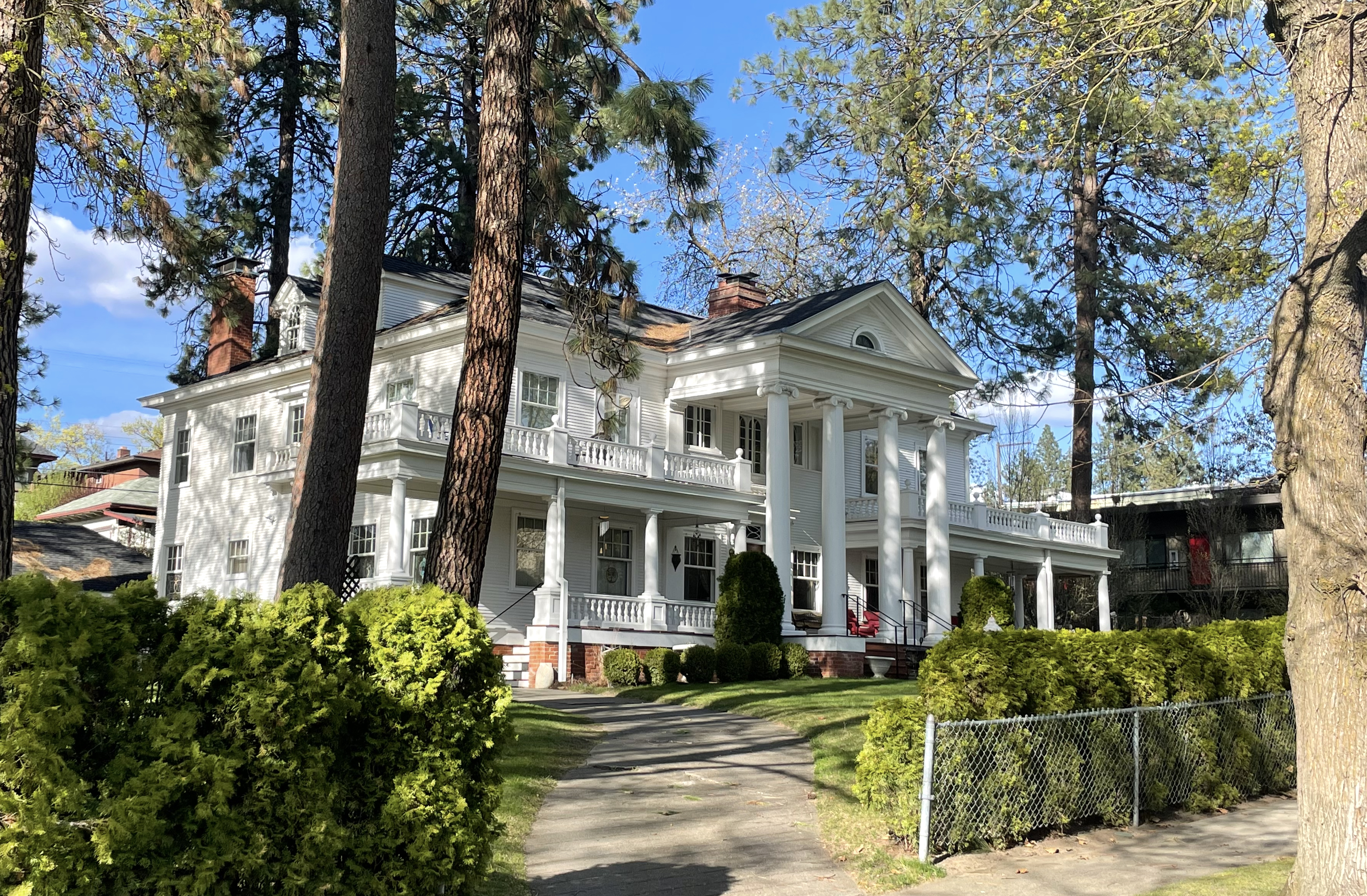
Colonial Revival home at Ninth and Madison

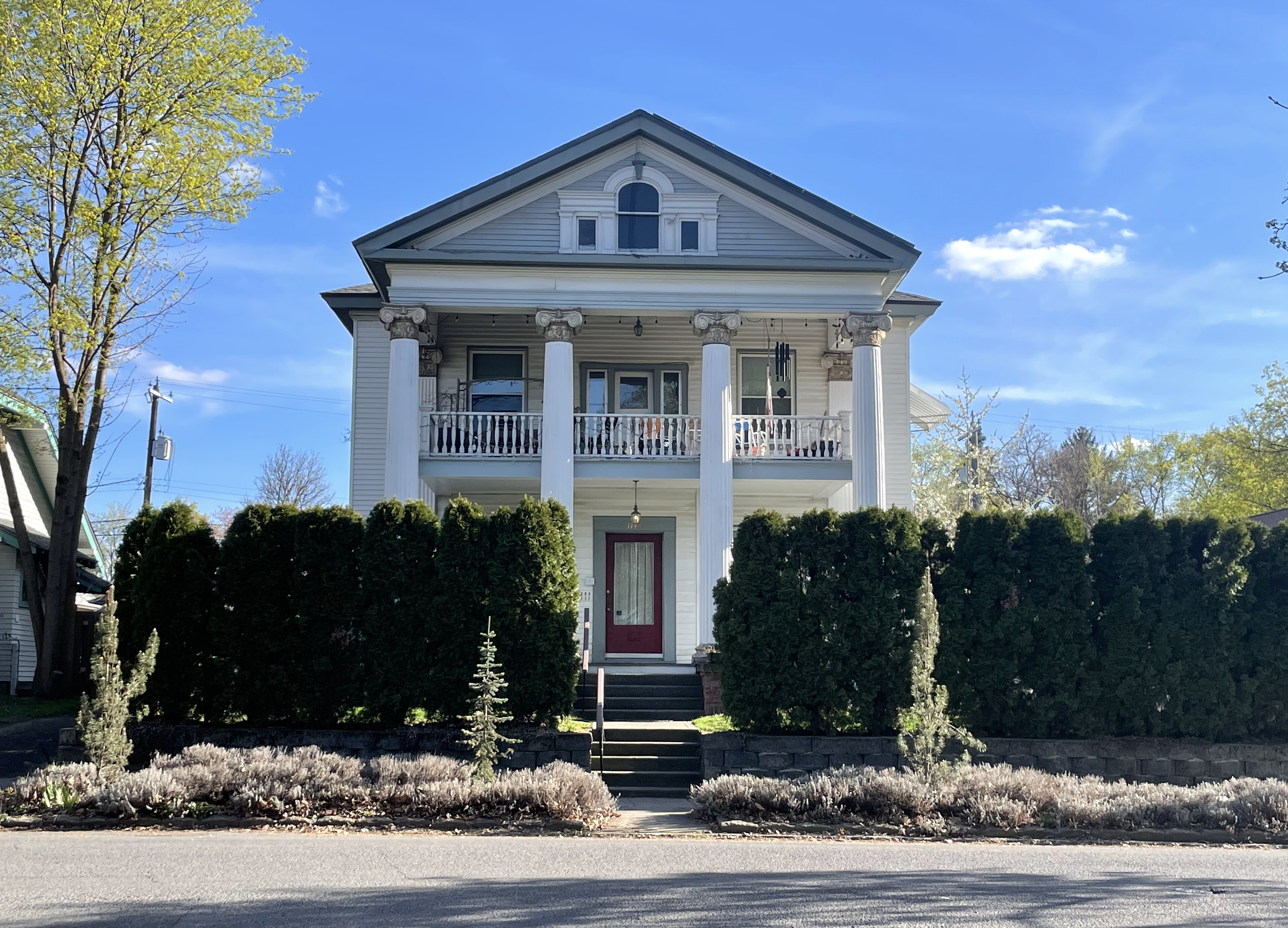
Colonial Revival home converted to apartments at 10th and Oak

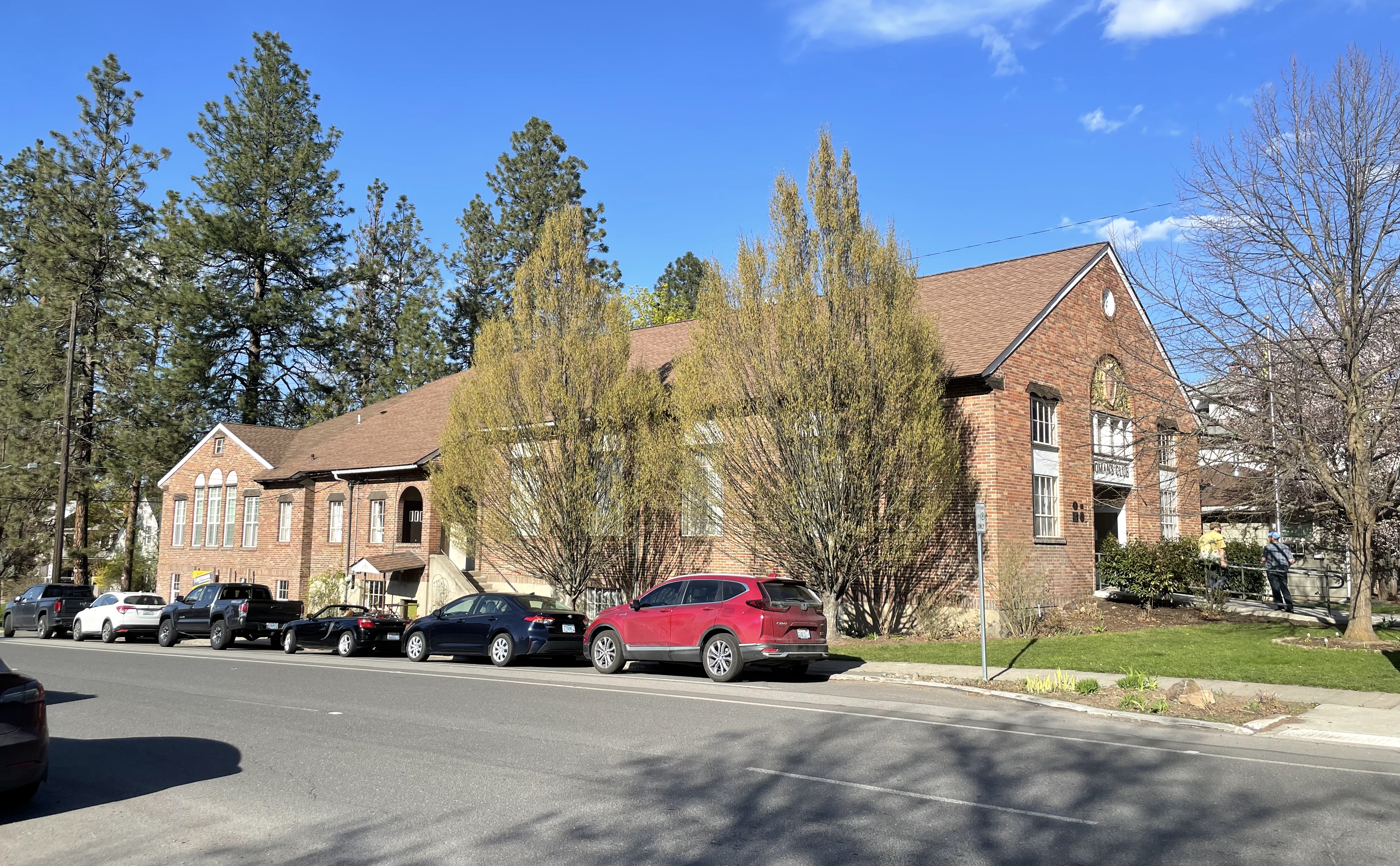
Woman's Club building, one of the few non-residential structures in the district

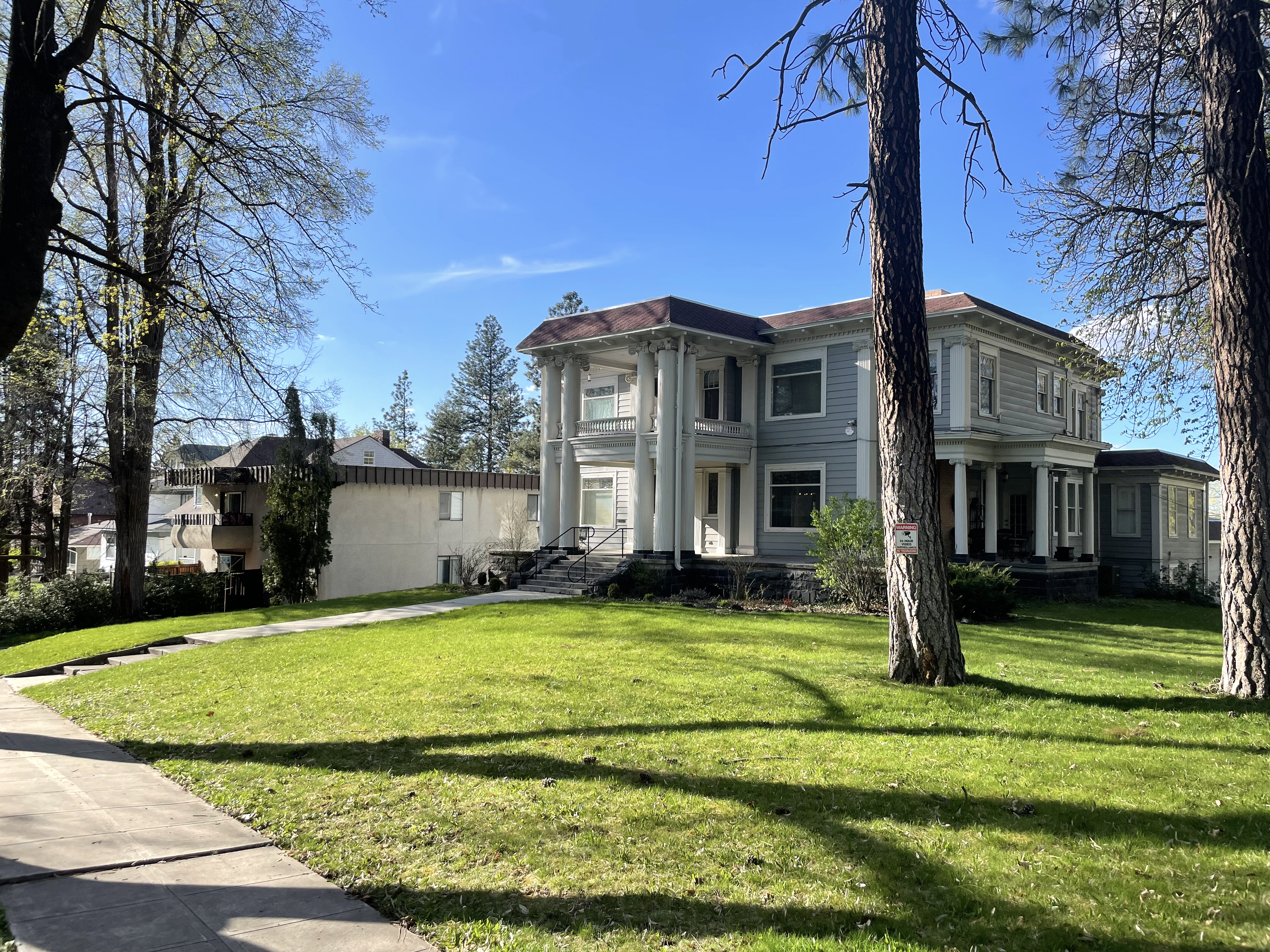
Colonial Revival apartments at Ninth and Cedar with modern incursion adjacent

== See also ==
- Cliff/Cannon, Spokane
- National Register of Historic Places listings in Spokane County, Washington
