= Coolidge–Rising House =

Historic house in Washington, United States

- U.S. National Register of Historic Places
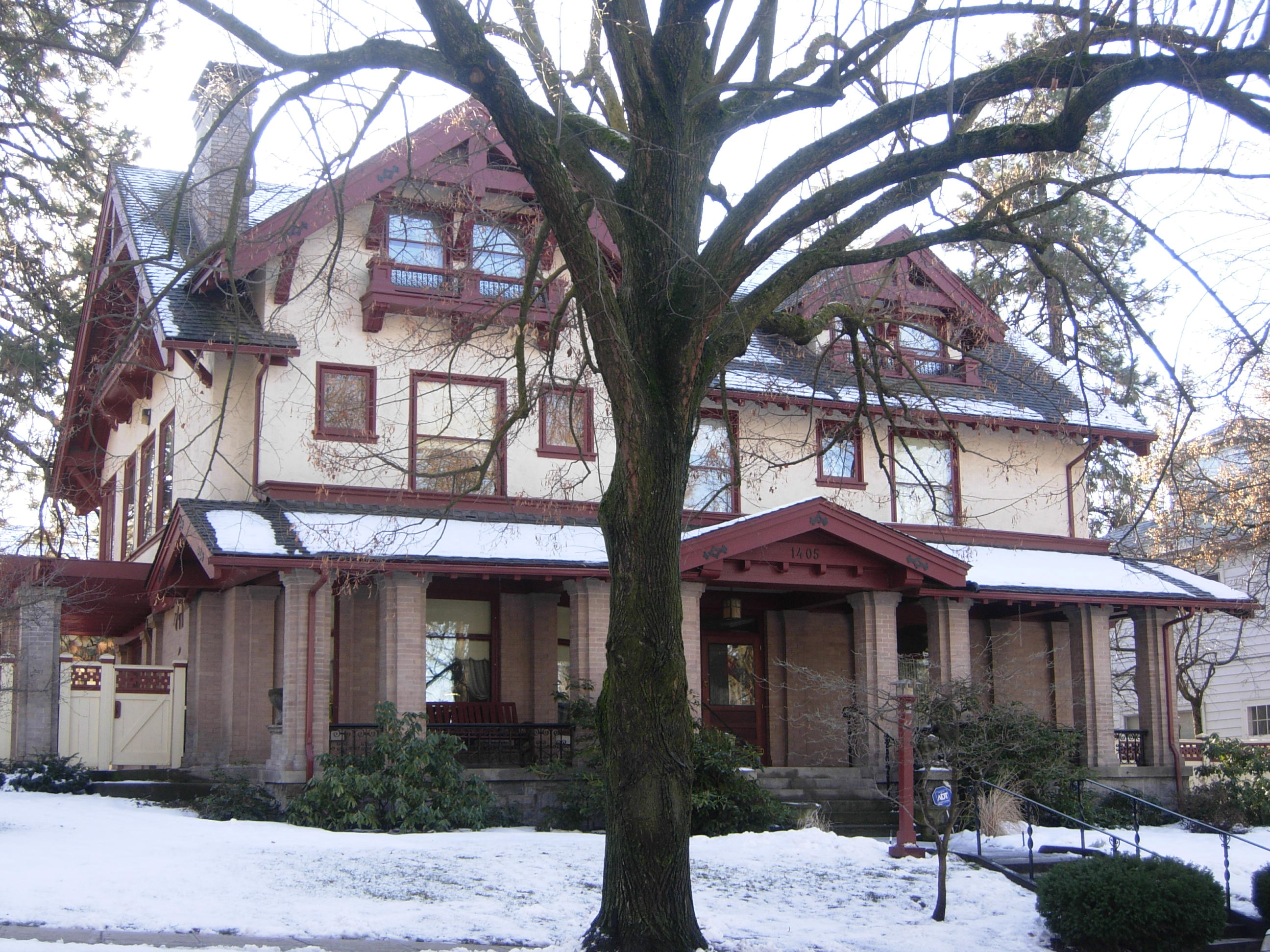

- Location within Spokane riverfront area
- Location: W. 1405 Ninth Ave., Spokane, Washington
- Coordinates: 47°38′50″N 117°25′54″W
- Area: less than one acre
- Built: 1906
- Architect: John K. Dow
- Architectural style: Bungalow/Craftsman
- NRHP reference No.: 88000598
- Added to NRHP: May 19, 1988

The Coolidge–Rising House is a house in Spokane, Washington, United States. It was designed by John K. Dow, and built in 1906. It was the residence of Alfred Coolidge, a financier, until Henry Rising, a long-time editor of the Spokane Daily Chronicle, bought it in 1924. It is located within the bounds of the NRHP-listed Ninth Avenue Historic District.
