= Empire State Building (Spokane, Washington) =

- U.S. National Register of Historic Places
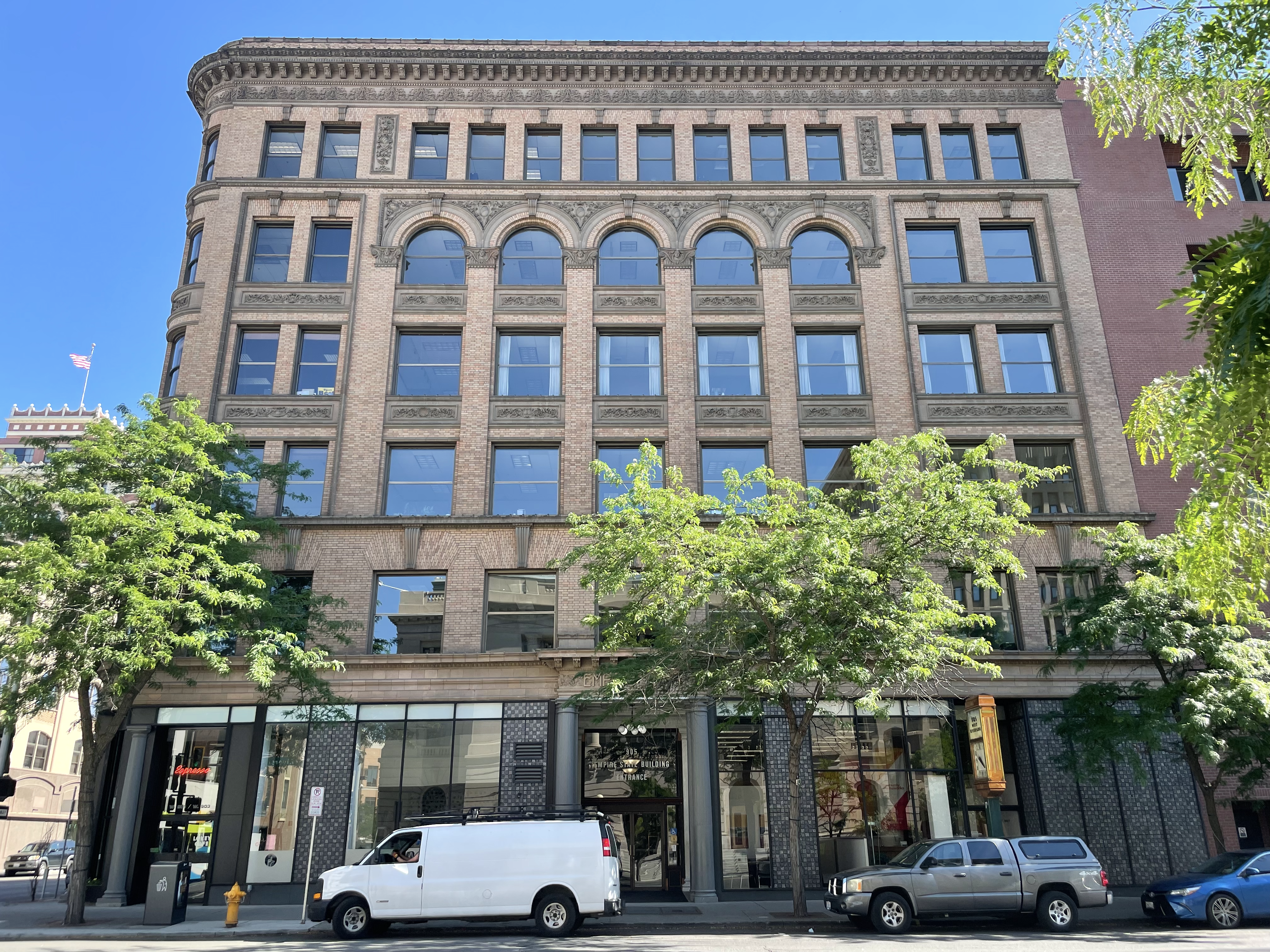
- The building in 2022

- Location within Spokane riverfront area
- Location: West 905 Riverside Street, Spokane, Washington
- Coordinates: 47°39′28″N 117°25′27″W
- Area: less than one acre
- Built: 1899
- Architect: John K. Dow
- NRHP reference No.: 77001361
- Added to NRHP: August 18, 1977

The Empire State Building, also known as the Great Western Savings and Loan Building, is a historic building in Downtown, Spokane, Washington. It was designed by architect John K. Dow, and built in 1899 for Charles Sweeny, an investor who had served under Union Army General George Armstrong Custer during the American Civil War of 1861–1865. It has been listed on the National Register of Historic Places since August 18, 1977.

== History ==
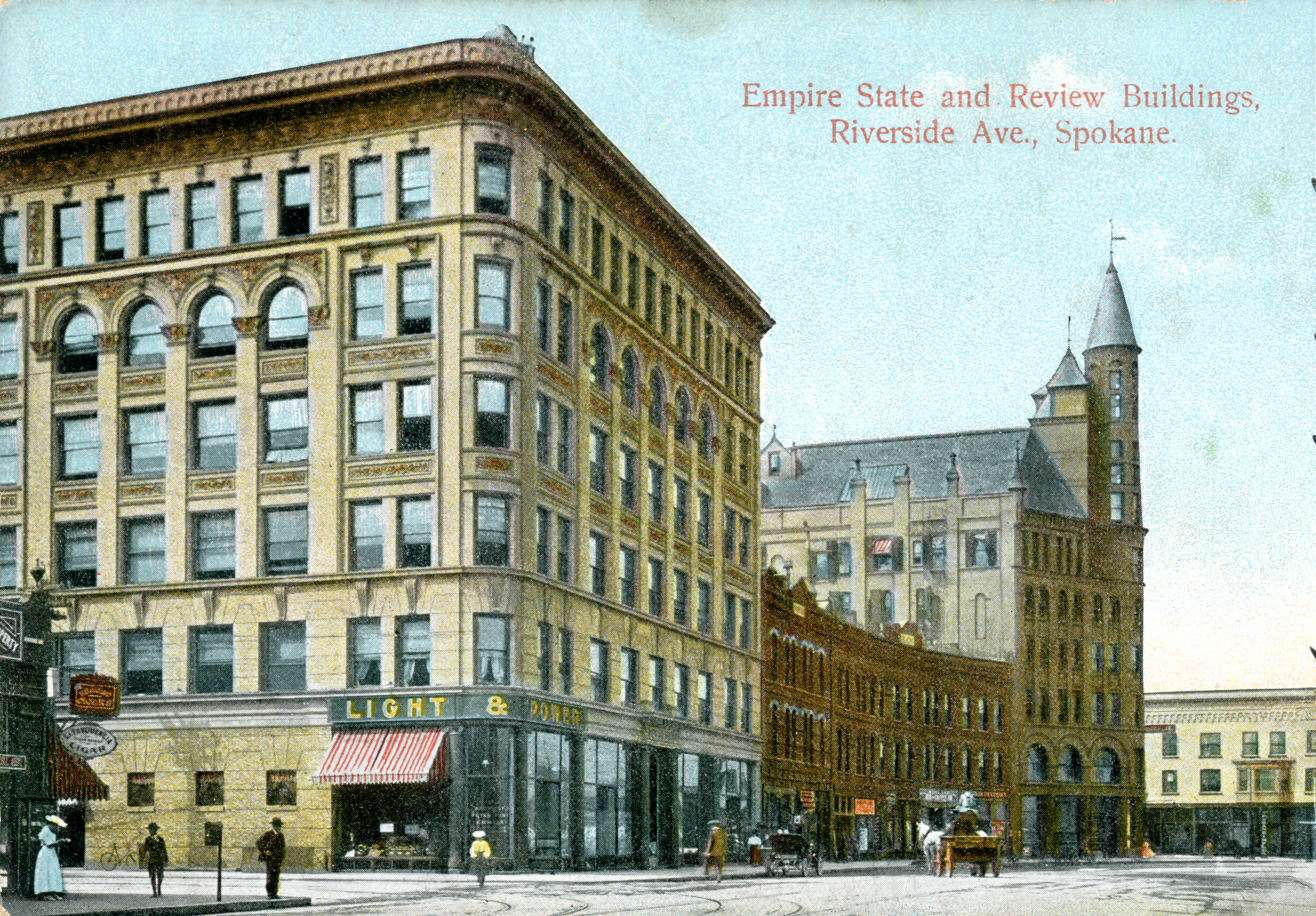
Empire State Building circa 1900-1910

The Empire State Building was commissioned by Charles Sweeny, a New York native and Civil War veteran who made a fortune in mining the nearby Coeur d'Alene Mining District in neighboring Idaho. In 1900, Sweeny founded the Empire State-Idaho Company to manage his holdings. Sweeny's company gave its name to the building, which explains the "Empire State" name, a nickname for New York State, appearing in the Old West. The building was built by Spokane architect John K. Dow and was Dow's first fireproof building within the city. Spokane's downtown had been devastated by the Great Spokane Fire a year prior, leading to a wave of new construction including the Empire State Building. The NRHP states that of all the buildings built in the immediate wake of the fire, "all other buildings in Spokane were overshadowed" by the Empire State Building's grandeur. Dow arrived in Spokane, aged 27, in 1889, the year of the fire, and helped rebuild the city.

Construction of the building was estimated at $100,000 but wound up coming in at closer to $800,000. The cost overruns were caused by a shortage in Carnegie steel and the boom of construction in Spokane in the wake of the Great Fire which led to a brick shortage. Spokanites of the time considered it to be the finest building in Spokane other than the Review Building, which is located down the block along Riverside Ave. to the west. The Empire State Building featured interior open elevators considered to be the fastest lifts west of Chicago at the time.

The building was sold to the Central Business Property company, which owned it from 1912 to 1958. During this time, the Washington Water Power company was the main first floor tenant from 1900 through 1958. Law offices dominated the rest of the building, as it was located across the street from the post office and federal building. Other tenants included a ground-floor drug store and a dry-goods store. In 1947 a Britton’s Department Store moved in for a few years.

Great Western Savings company had been located next door and on the ground floor of the Empire State Building, starting in the early-1950s. In 1961, the building was renamed the Great Western Savings Building. Great Western Savings was acquired by Washington Mutual in 1997 and ultimately folded in 2008. In 2011, Goodale & Barbieri company, then owners of the building, reverted the name to Empire State Building.

== Description ==
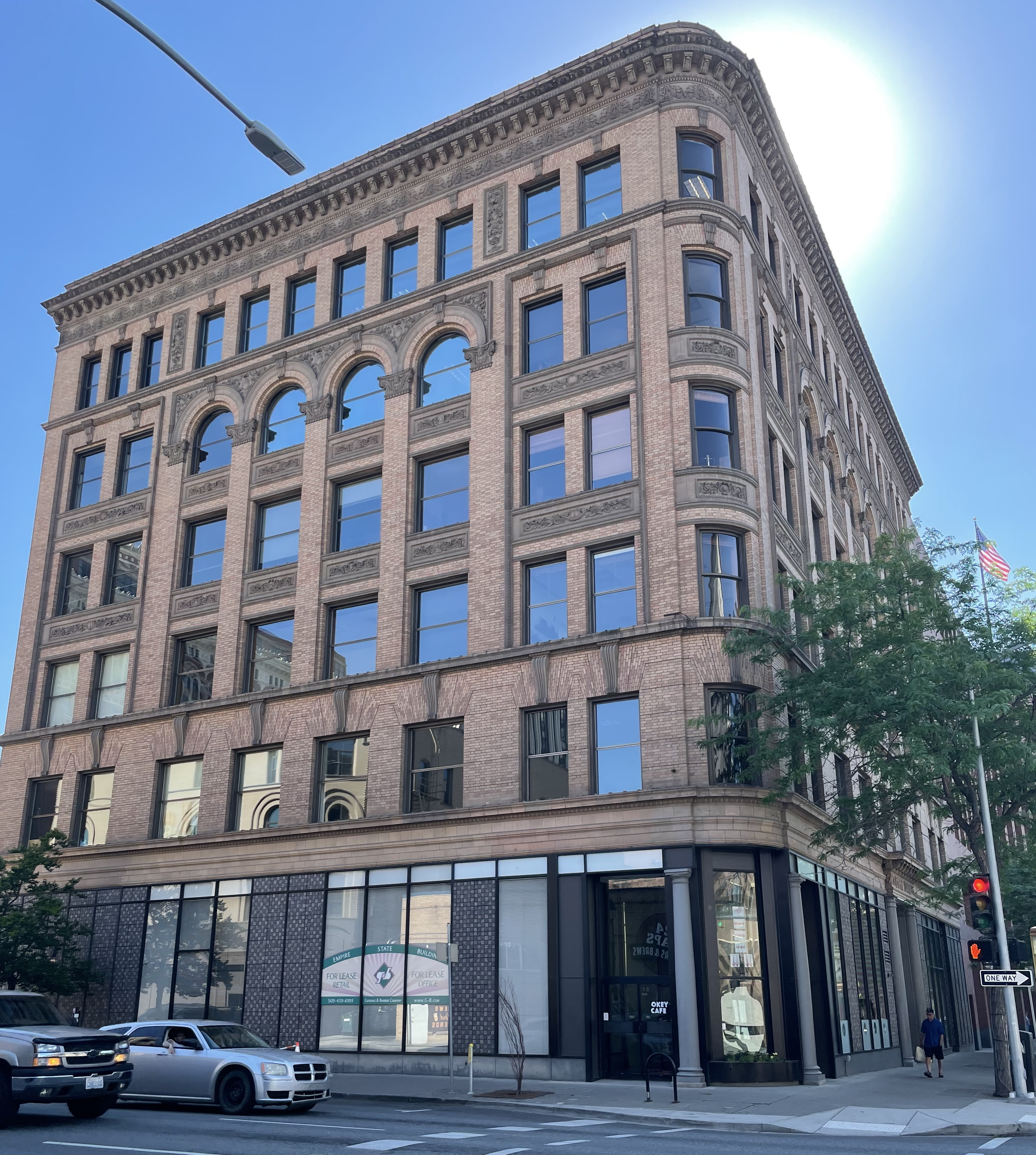
Lincoln Street facade in 2022

=== Setting ===
The Empire State Building is located at 901 W. Riverside Ave. at the corner of Riverside and Lincoln Street in the heart of Spokane's central business district. The historic Spokesman-Review building is located down the block to the west, and the historic Federal Building and U.S. Post Office is located across the street to the north. The city Lincoln Street to the east as a major arterial and Riverside Ave. to the north is classified as a minor arterial. Lincoln Street provides northbound traffic to the Monroe Street Bridge a block-and-a-half to the north. Sprague Avenue runs a half-block to the south.

=== Architecture ===
Designed by architect John K. Dow, the six-story, 96 foot tall Empire State Building sits on a 100-by-90 foot lot, of which it occupies all but the rear five feet. It is a steel framework rectangular structure with brick facing the exterior. Ground floor walls are 16 inches thick.

Facades facing Lincoln Street and Riverside Avenue are defined by vertical piers spanning the third through fifth stories with evenly spaced window arcades between them. String courses run along the second, third and sixth stories. Along the rooftop an elaborate cornice rings the street-facing sides. Buff-colored bricks make up the street-facing facades with terra-cotta ornamentation in the form of panels and trim.

The interior formerly included an interior lift through the atrium of the building that was considered the fastest west of Chicago when it was built. The elevator was later moved but the cage in the atrium from the former lift remains alongside the staircase.

== Gallery ==
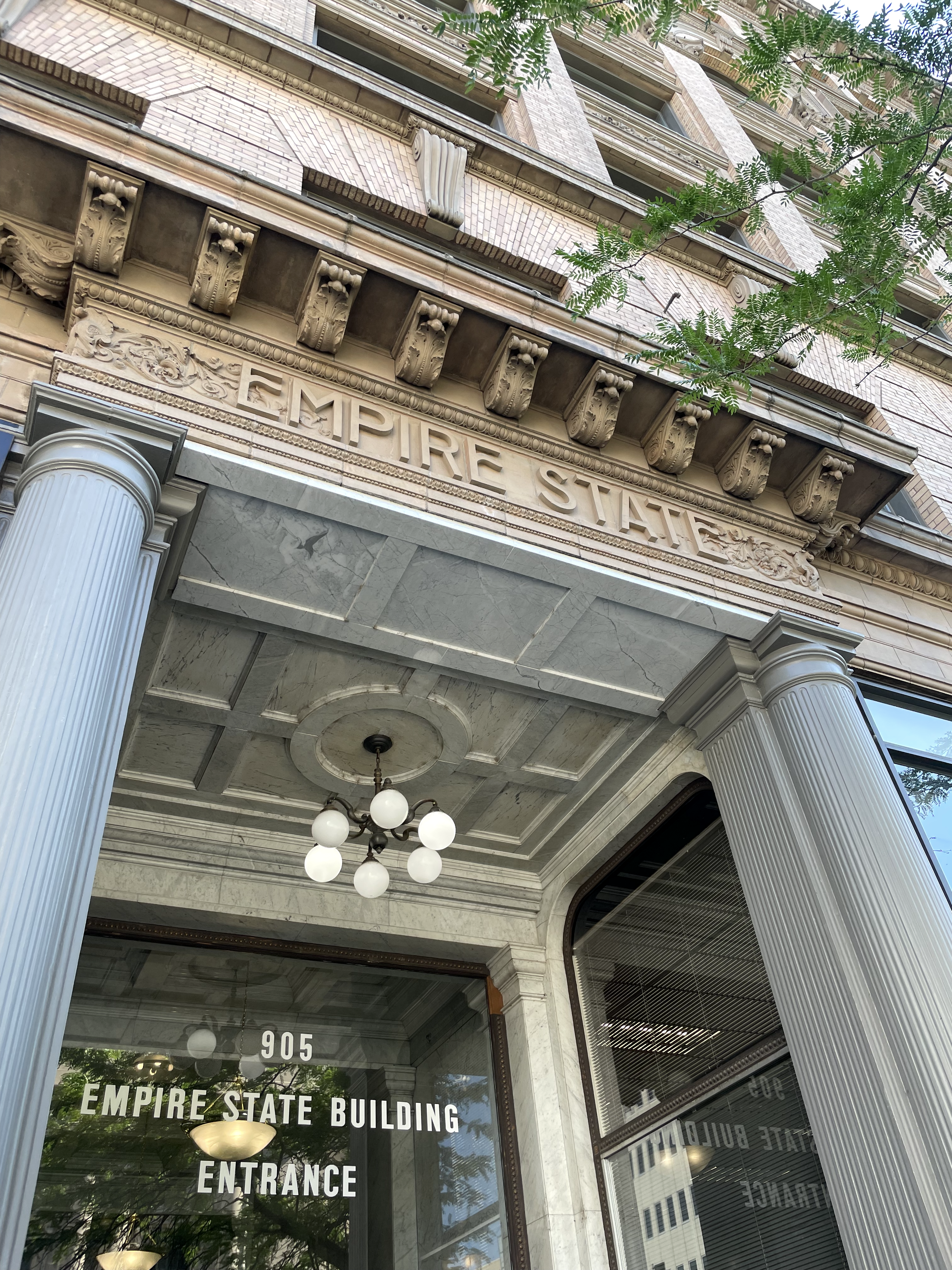
Main entrance on Riverside Avenue

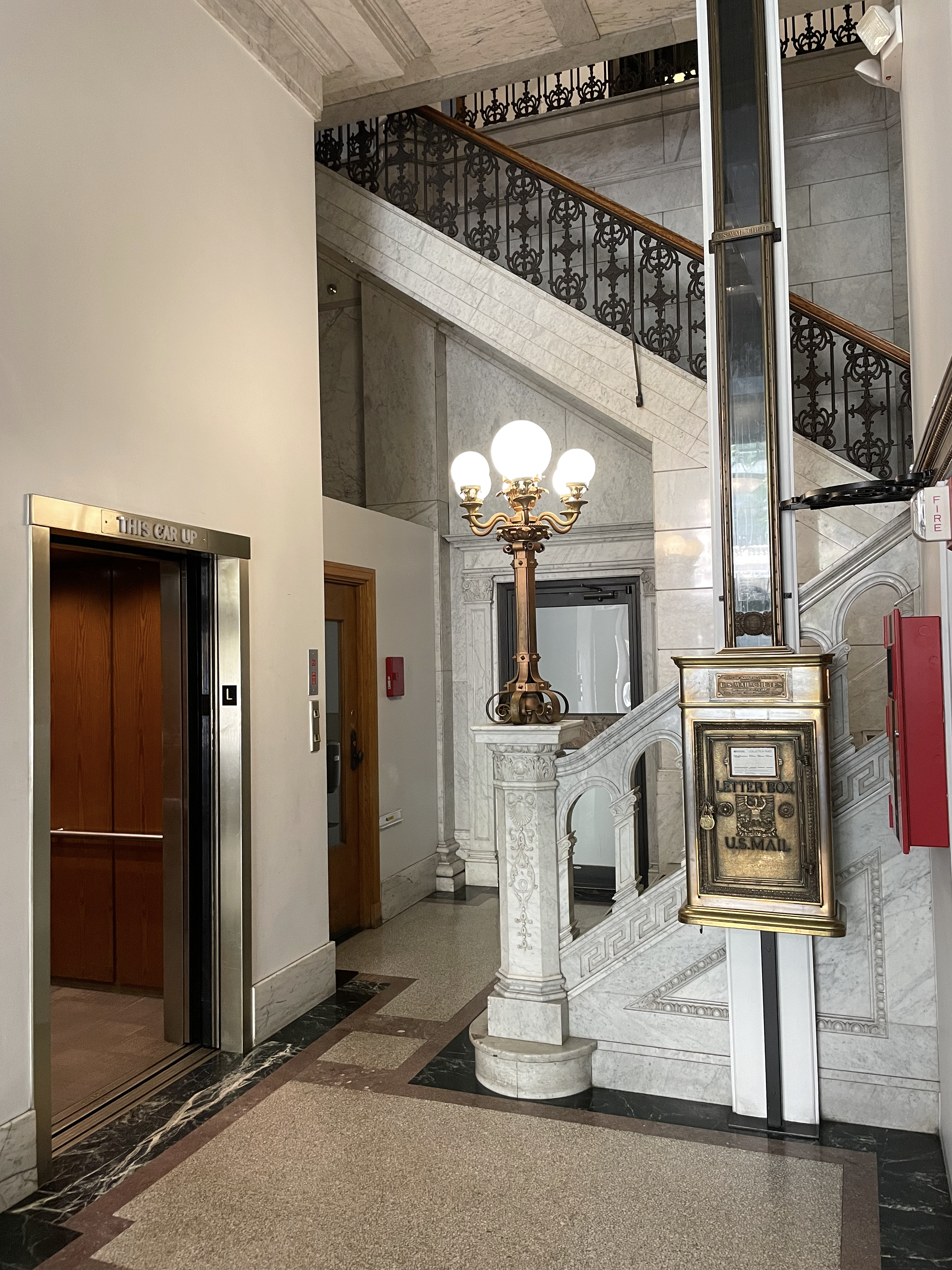
First floor main entrance lobby

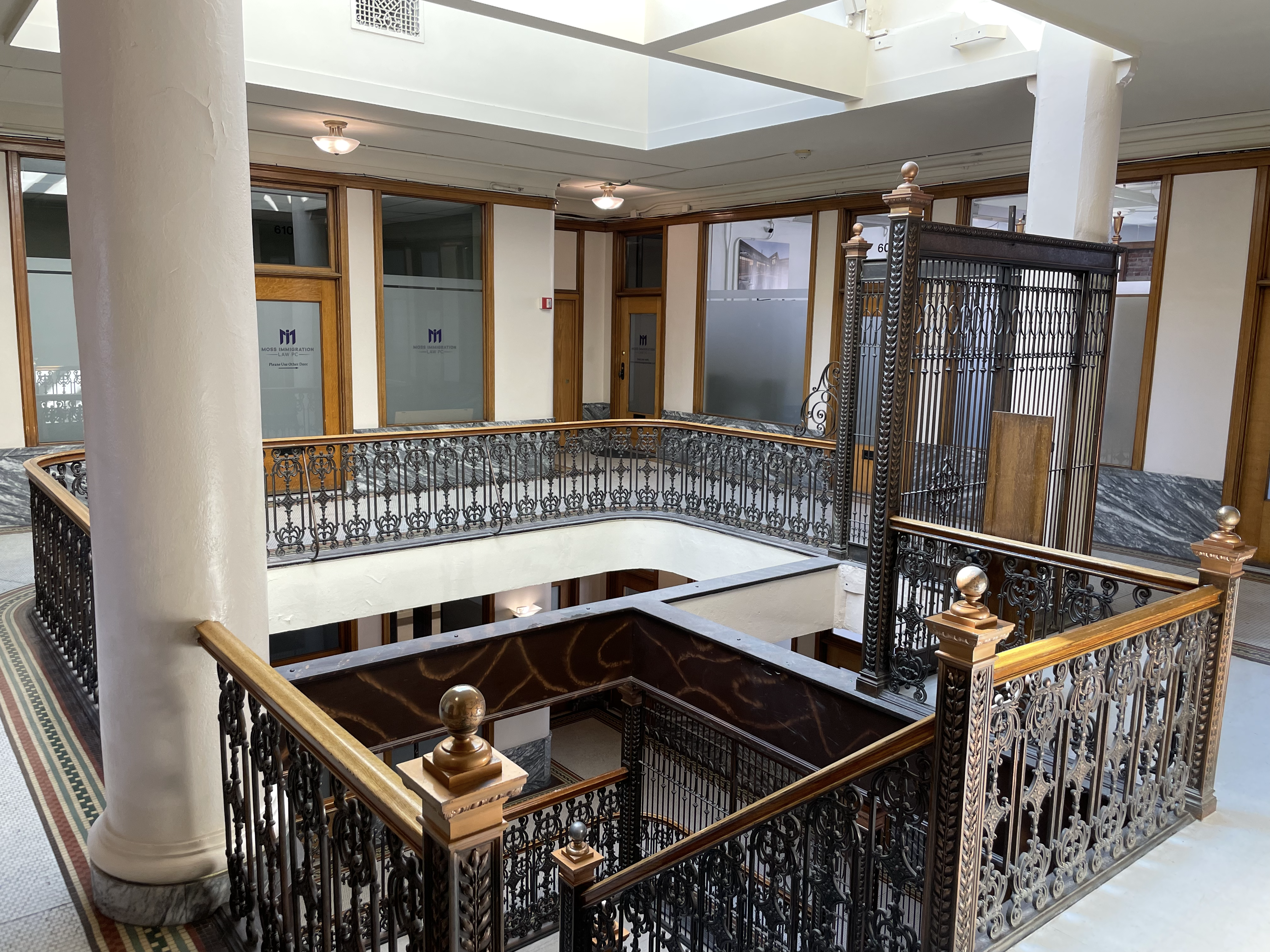
Sixth floor looking at the top of the staircase

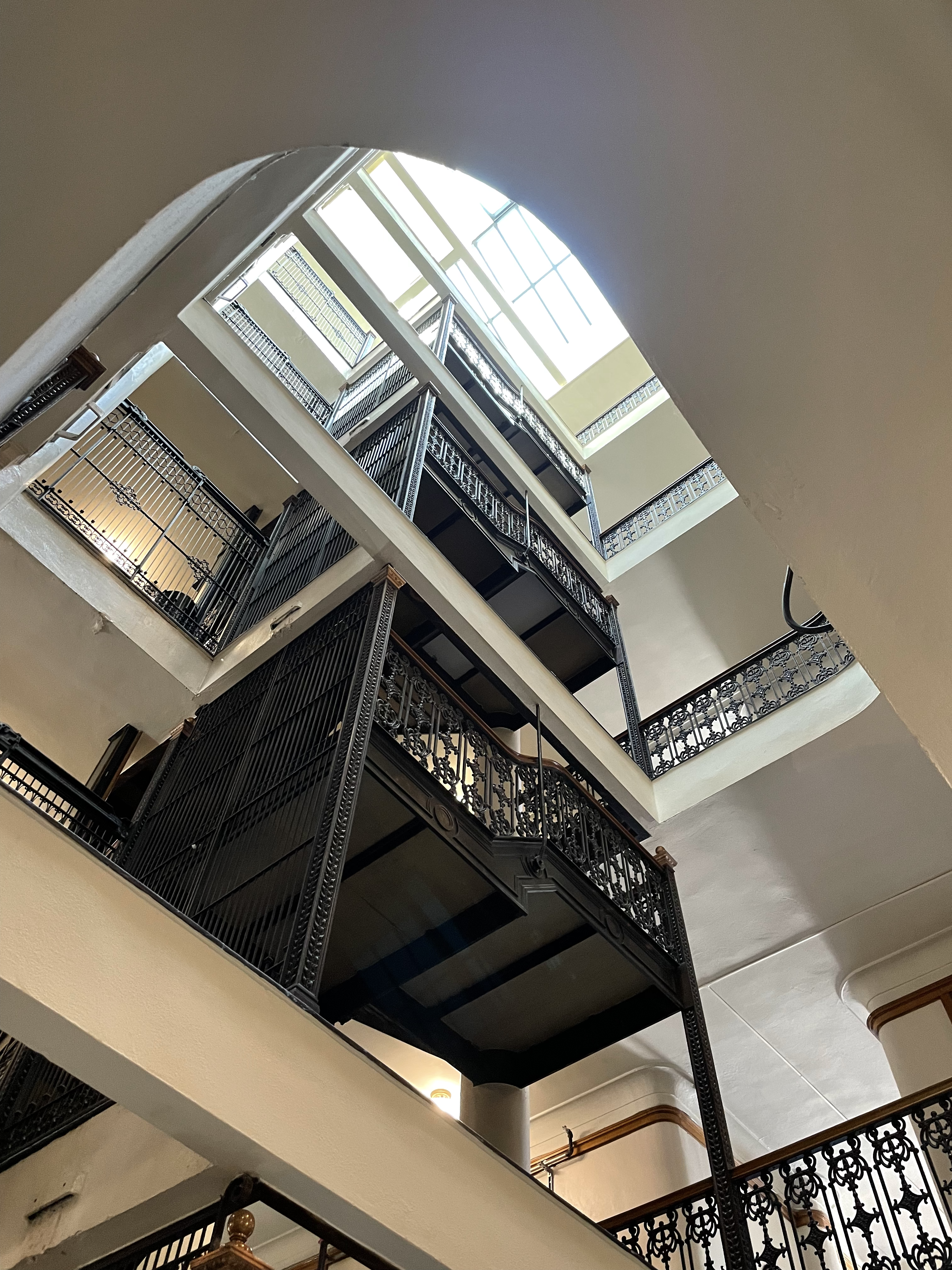
Second floor looking up the staircase and atrium
