= Emerson/Garfield, Spokane =

Emerson/Garfield
- Spokane Neighborhood
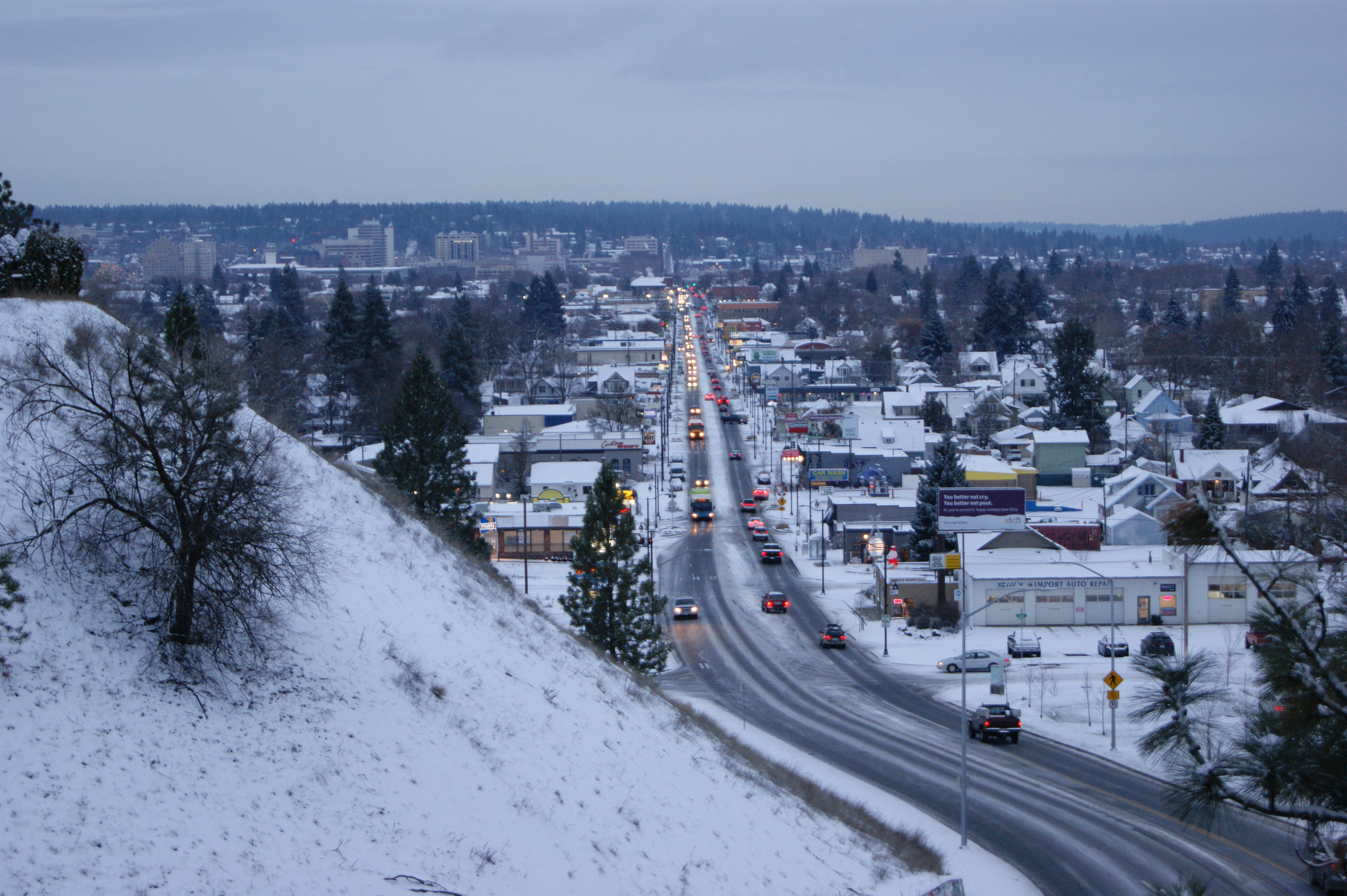
- Monroe Street looking south over Emerson/Garfield towards Downtown Spokane

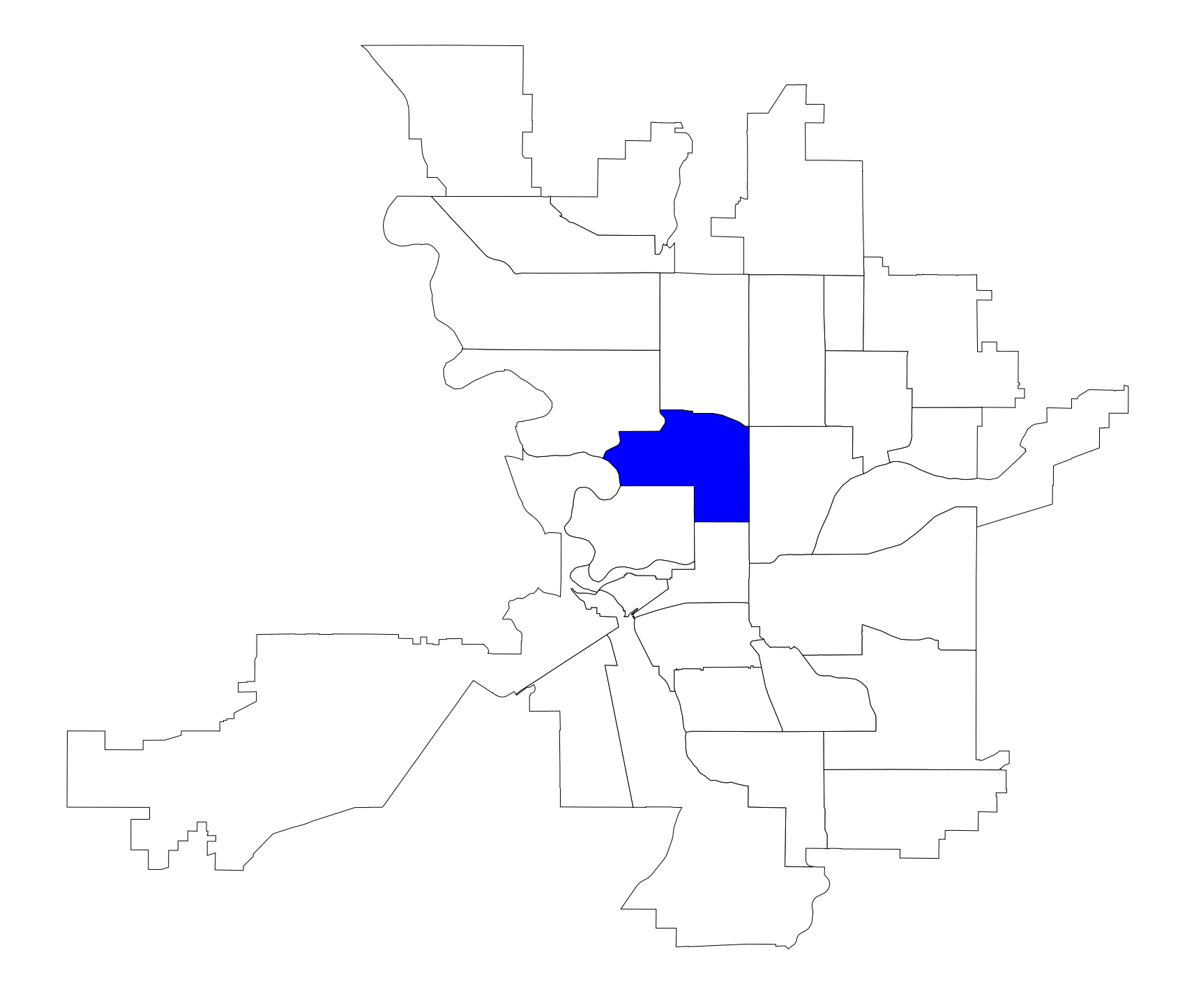
- Location within the city of Spokane
- Coordinates: 47°40′57.7″N 117°25′25.1″W
- Country: United States
- State: Washington
- County: Spokane
- City: Spokane

Population (2017)
  - Total: 9,690

Demographics 2017
  - White: 83.3%
  - Latinx: 7.7%
  - American Indian: 3.1%
  - Asian/Native Hawaiian/Pacific Islander: 2.5%
  - Black: 2.5%
- Time zone: UTC-8 (PST)
  - Summer (DST): UTC-7 (PDT)
- ZIP Codes: 99201, 99205
- Area code: 509

Emerson/Garfield is a neighborhood in Spokane, Washington. It is located immediately north of Downtown Spokane's North Bank and extends out into the inner northwestern portion of the city. Emerson/Garfield is a diverse neighborhood with residential, commercial and civic zones all bordering one another, with density ranging from single-family homes to multi-use buildings. Due to its location in the central area of Spokane, Emerson/Garfield is criss-crossed by numerous arterials and thoroughfares. Along those main roads are numerous commercial and retail districts of importance to both the neighborhood and city as a whole.

== Geography ==
Emerson/Garfield is located immediately north of Downtown Spokane and south of the North Hill bluff. Division Street is the neighborhood's eastern border, and the city's main north–south thoroughfare. Division Street also carries U.S. Route 2 and U.S. Route 395. It is a major commercial district as well. The northern boundary mostly follows a natural rise in elevation along Cora Avenue. The T.J. Meenach Bridge over the Spokane River marks the westernmost point of the neighborhood. Indiana Avenue serves as the southern border for the western two-thirds until Monroe Street, where the boundary moves south to Boone Avenue.

Topographically, the neighborhood is mostly flat and lies on a plain near the Spokane River at the westernmost edge of the Spokane Valley. Elevations in Emerson/Garfield tend to rise gradually to the north and to the east, away from the river. Emerson/Garfield sits at approximately 1,900 feet above sea level, but the surrounding terrain rises rapidly at the north, at North Hill, and falls off quickly at the west, to the Spokane River.

== Districts ==
=== North Central ===
North Central is so named for being located directly north of the central business district of Spokane, though it is the most southerly portion of the Emerson/Garfield neighborhood. It is also the area surrounding North Central High School. It is bounded by Indiana Avenue on the north, Division Street on the east, Boone Avenue on the south and Monroe Street on the west. North Central's built environment is a blend of the denser downtown core to the south and the rest of the city to the north. Residential and commercial zones of mixed densities border each other across North Central, with single family homes across the street from multi-story office complexes and mid-density apartments alongside commercial centers.

=== Corbin Park ===
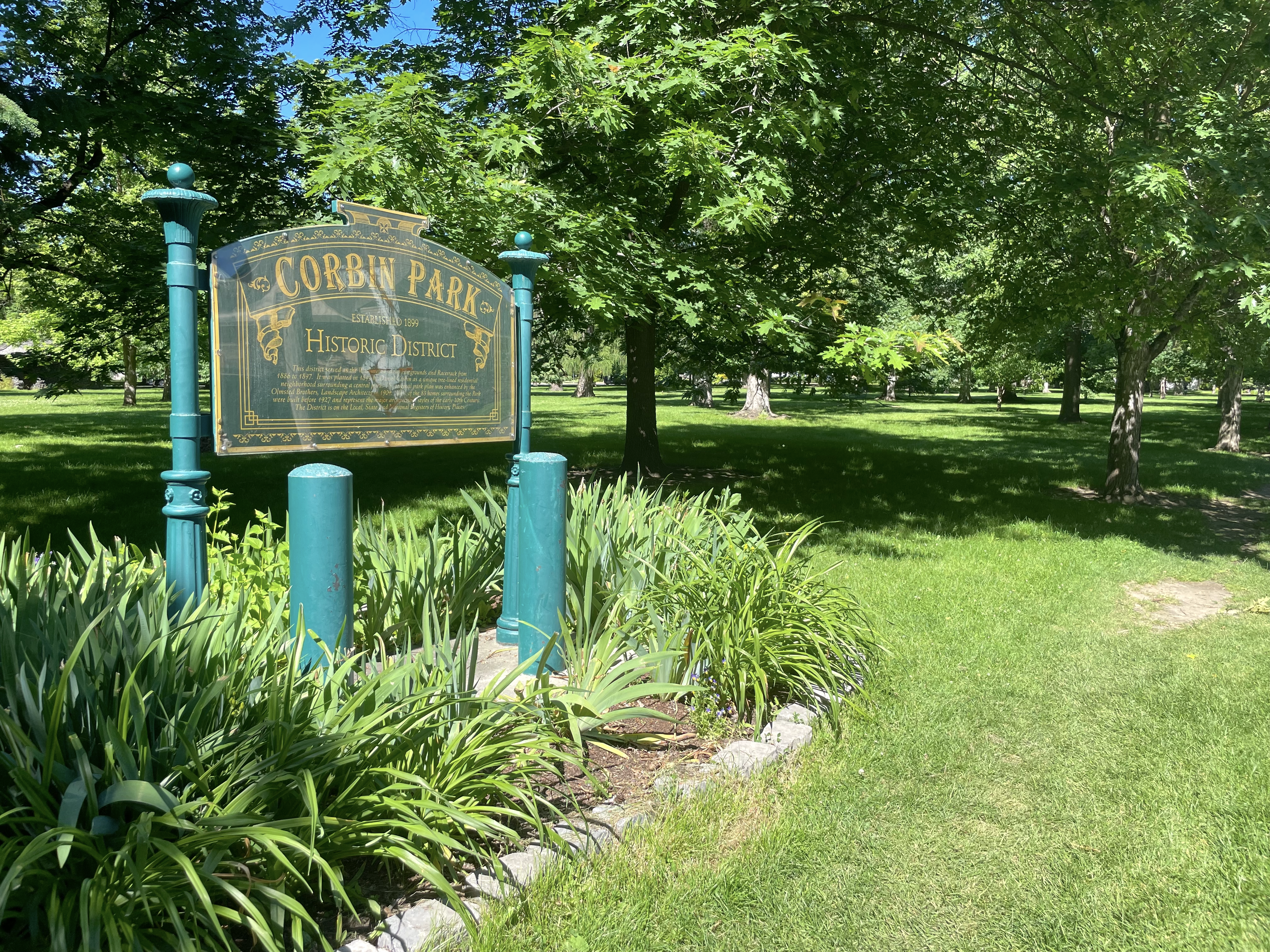
Corbin Park and Historic District

Surrounding the public park which gives this area its name is the Corbin Park Historic District. Corbin Park is a four block long by one block wide, oval of a park that was originally home to Spokane's first fairgrounds. The oval shape is a remnant of the track that once surrounded the park. It is now surrounded by homes built between 1900 and 1925 in the Queen Anne, Tudor Revival, American Foursquare, Arts & Crafts, and Bungalow styles. The design of the park was made by the Olmsted Brothers in 1909.

The Corbin Park area is located in the northwestern corner of Emerson/Garfield. Division Street runs along a ridge above and to the east, while the North Hill ridge rises to the north behind Cora Avenue. Post Street on the west and Buckeye Avenue on the north mark the other bounds. The historic district itself is much smaller, and contained to only the streets immediately surrounding Corbin Park. It includes all properties from Post Street on the west to Normandie Street on the east, which front Park Place, Waverly Place, West Oval and East Oval.

=== North Monroe ===
Monroe Street is a major north–south thoroughfare in Spokane. It connects Emerson/Garfield with points to the north in the city with Downtown Spokane via the Monroe Street Bridge. It is also a commercial and retail district as it passes through the neighborhood. In 2018, major work amounting to about $7 million was completed turning Monroe Street from what can be referred to as a five-lane "stroad" into a three-lane street, with enhanced streetscape features including pedestrian and public transit resources. The North Monroe Corridor spills south into the Riverside and West Central neighborhoods, and is home to numerous businesses, shops, restaurants and other commercial ventures.

=== Audubon ===
Audubon/Downriver is an official neighborhood bordering Emerson/Garfield to the northwest, but the broader Audubon area extends into the northwesternmost corner of Emerson/Garfield. Audubon Elementary, a public school, is located on Carlisle Avenue in Emerson/Garfield, with its campus extending to Northwest Boulevard. There is a commercial and retail business district along Northwest Boulevard here that stretches into the Audubon/Downriver Neighborhood proper.

== History ==
The area that is now Emerson/Garfield was inhabited since prehistoric times by the Spokane.

Emerson/Garfield was one of the first areas settled by Europeans in the Spokane area after the city was founded, and Corbin Park became the site of fairs from 1887. In 1899, Corbin Park would take on its name when D.C. Corbin, a railroad and mining magnate, purchased and platted the area. Corbin established the park, and Queen Anne, bungalow and classic box-style homes were built around it. The residential areas of the neighborhood were mostly built out by the early 1900s. In 1913, the Olmsted Brothers updated the park as part of their master plan design for the city.

=== Historic places ===
Emerson/Garfield is home to 2 properties listed individually on the National Register of Historic Places as well as the NRHP-listed Corbin Park Historic District.

| | Name on the Register | Image | Date listed | Location | Description |
|---|---|---|---|---|---|
| 1 | Alonzo and Louise Barnett House | Alonzo and Louise Barnett House | August 21, 2003 (#03000809) | 902 W. Augusta Ave. 47°40′24″N 117°25′41″W | Built in 1903. |
| 2 | Spokane Public Library | Spokane Public Library | August 3, 1982 (#82004292) | 925 W. Montgomery St. 47°40′42″N 117°25′31″W | Carnegie Libraries of Washington TR |

== Demographics ==
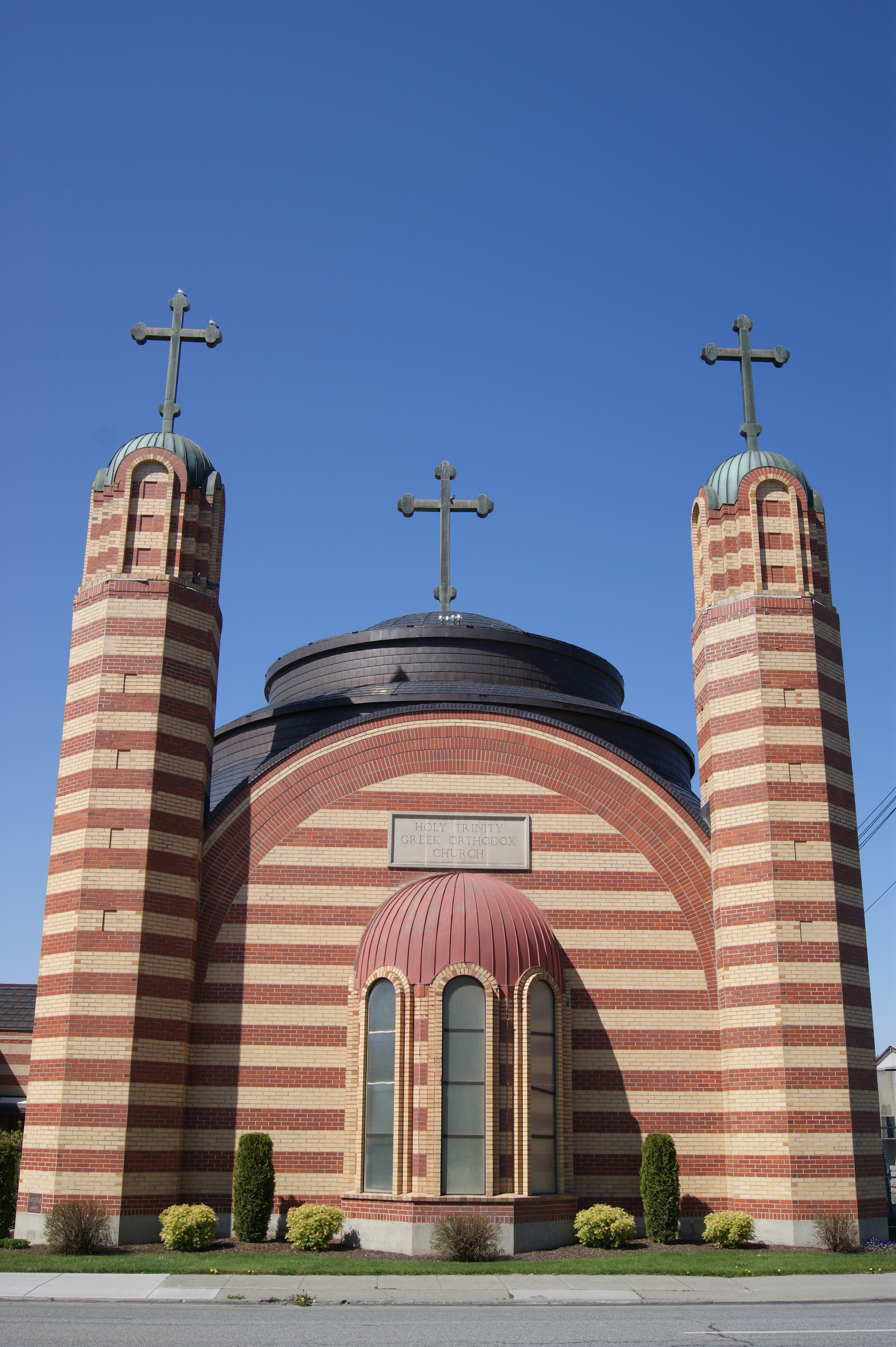
Holy Trinity Greek Orthodox Church

As of 2017, Emerson/Garfield was home to 9,690 people across 4,156 households. 15.1% of the population was above the age of 65 while 23.9% was aged 19 or younger. Persons of color made up 4.3% of the population, compared to 15.1% citywide. The median household income was $38,108, compared to $44,678 citywide. 51.5% of households were rented, compared to 45.3% citywide. The unemployment rate was 9%, above the citywide rate of 6.57%. 95.7% of residents were born in the United States or its territories, but of those who were not 19.6% came from Ukraine, 9.9% from Canada, 7.1% from Germany and 6.6% from South Korea.

== Education ==
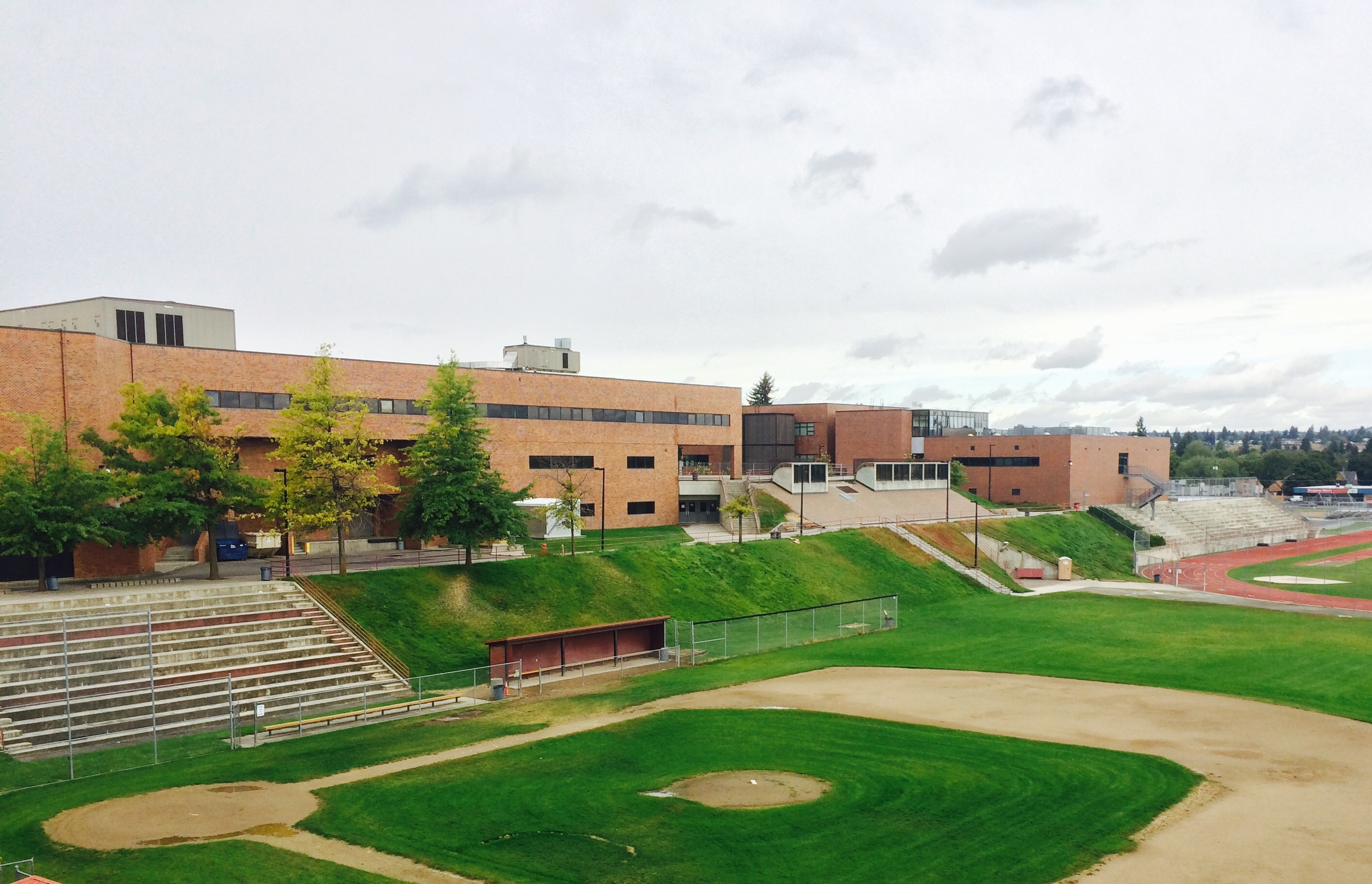
North Central High School

Emerson/Garfield is served by Spokane Public Schools. It is home to four public schools, two elementary and two high schools. There is also one private school, Trinity Catholic, an elementary school, in the neighborhood.

Garfield Elementary serves Emerson/Garfield east of Monroe, while Audubon Elementary serves the neighborhood west of Monroe. Garfield feeds into Yasuhara Middle School, in the adjacent Logan neighborhood. Audubon feeds into Glover Middle School, in the adjacent Audubon/Downriver neighborhood. Both districts then feed into North Central High School, located in Emerson/Garfield.

Havermale High School, a public alternative and montessori school is located in Emerson/Garfield.

== Transportation ==
=== Highway ===
- U.S. 2 - to Newport, Washington (east) and Interstate 90 (west).

- U.S 395 - to Colville, Washington (north) and Interstate 90 (south).

=== City Streets ===
Located centrally within the city, Emerson/Garfield is well connected to the rest of the city street grid. Many streets through the neighborhood are considered urban principal arterials, the highest level of classification in the city. They are, from east to west, Division Street, Washington Street (to Buckeye Avenue), Monroe Street, Northwest Boulevard, the Maple/Ash Street couplet and T.J. Meenach Drive. Mission/Maxwell Avenue is the only east-west urban principal arterial in the neighborhood, though east-west streets Buckeye Avenue, Indiana Avenue and Boone Avenue are considered as urban minor arterials.

Dedicated bike lanes going north-south are located along Bernard Street and Lincoln Street, and going east-west on Maxwell Avenue and Buckeye Avenue. There is a shared-use path along Pettet Drive on the western edge of Emerson/Garfield.

=== Public Transit ===
The Spokane Transit Authority, the region's public transportation provider, serves Emerson/Garfield with seven fixed route bus lines.

| Route | Termini | | | Service operation and notes | Streets traveled |
|---|---|---|---|---|---|
| 4; Monroe | Downtown Spokane; STA Plaza | ↔ | Balboa/South Indian Trail; Five Mile Park and Ride | High-frequency route | Monroe |
| 25; Division | Downtown Spokane; STA Plaza | ↔ | Fairwood; Hastings Park and Ride | High-frequency route | Division/Ruby Couplet |
| 33; Wellesley | West Hills; Spokane Falls Community College | ↔ | Chief Garry Park; Spokane Community College | High-frequency route | T.J. Meenach, Cochran |
| 23; Maple/Ash | Downtown Spokane; STA Plaza | ↔ | North Indian Trail | Basic-frequency route | Boone, Maple/Ash Street couplet |
| 22; Northwest Boulevard | Downtown Spokane; STA Plaza | ↔ | Balboa/South Indian Trail; Five Mile Park & Ride | Basic-frequency route | Boone, Maple/Ash couplet, Northwest Boulevard |
| 27; Hillyard | Downtown Spokane; STA Plaza | ↔ | Balboa/South Indian Trail; Five Mile Park & Ride | Basic-frequency route; via Hillyard | Washington, Indiana |

Route 11 is an commuter shuttle route connecting the STA Plaza with the park and ride center at the Spokane Arena, across the street from Emerson/Garfield's southern border on Boone Street, but does not stop in the neighborhood itself. Route 124 is an express route connecting Downtown with park and ride centers in Fairwood, via Monroe Avenue, but it makes its last outbound stop four blocks south of Emerson/Garfield's southern border.
