= Clarence Z. Hubbell =

American architect

- Born: August 13, 1869; Onarga, Illinois, U.S.
- Died: 1953 (aged 83–84); New York, U.S.
- Education: Art Institute of Chicago
- Occupation: Architect

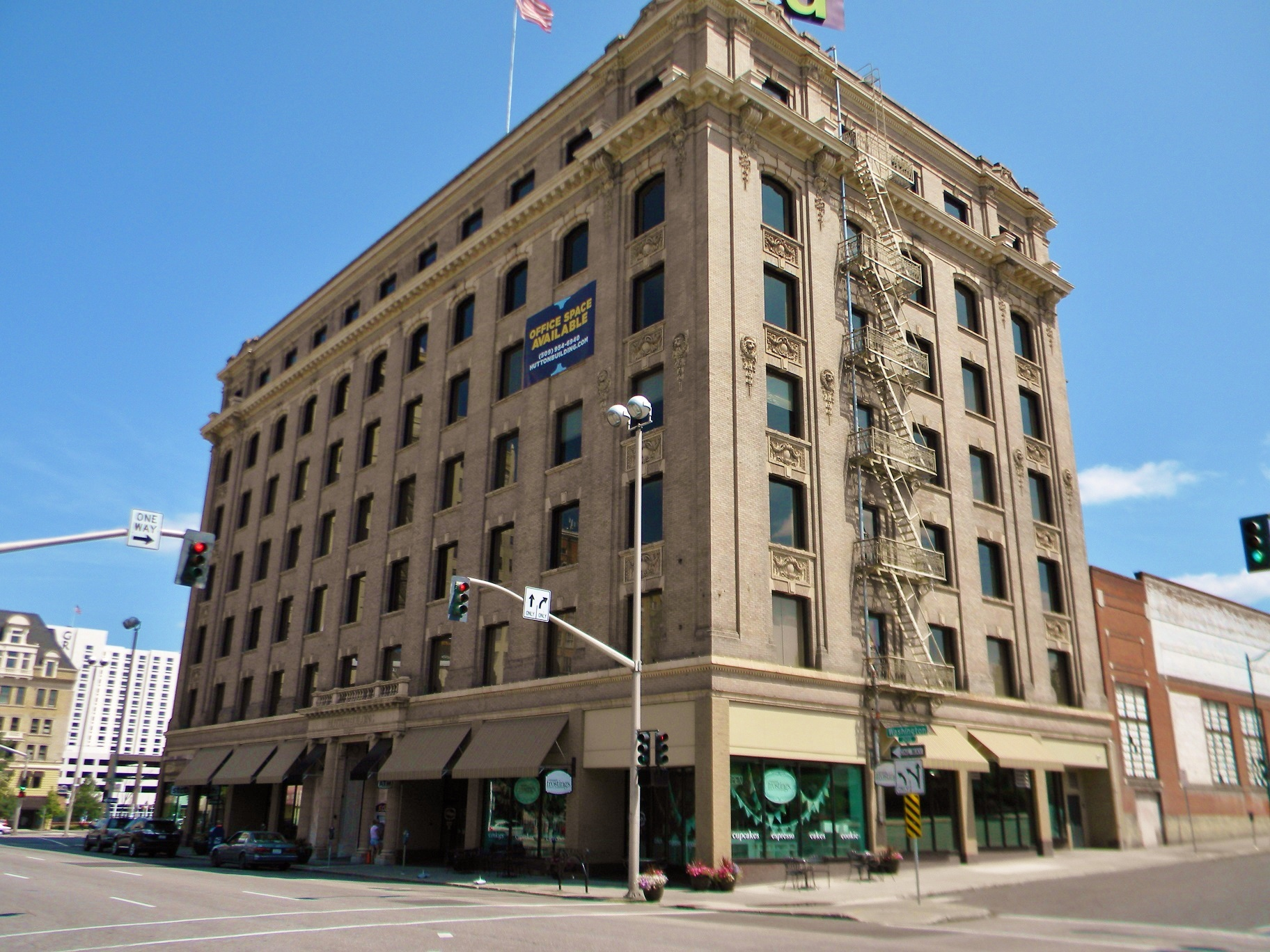
The Hutton Building, designed by Dow and Hubbell.

Clarence Z. Hubbell (August 13, 1869 - 1953) was an American architect. Born in Illinois and educated at the Art Institute of Chicago, he settled in Spokane, Washington in 1900. With John K. Dow, he designed the NRHP-listed Hutton Building. They also designed Van Doren Hall and the Veterinary Science Building on the campus of Washington State University in Pullman, Washington.
