= Corbin Park Historic District =

- U.S. National Register of Historic Places
- U.S. Historic district
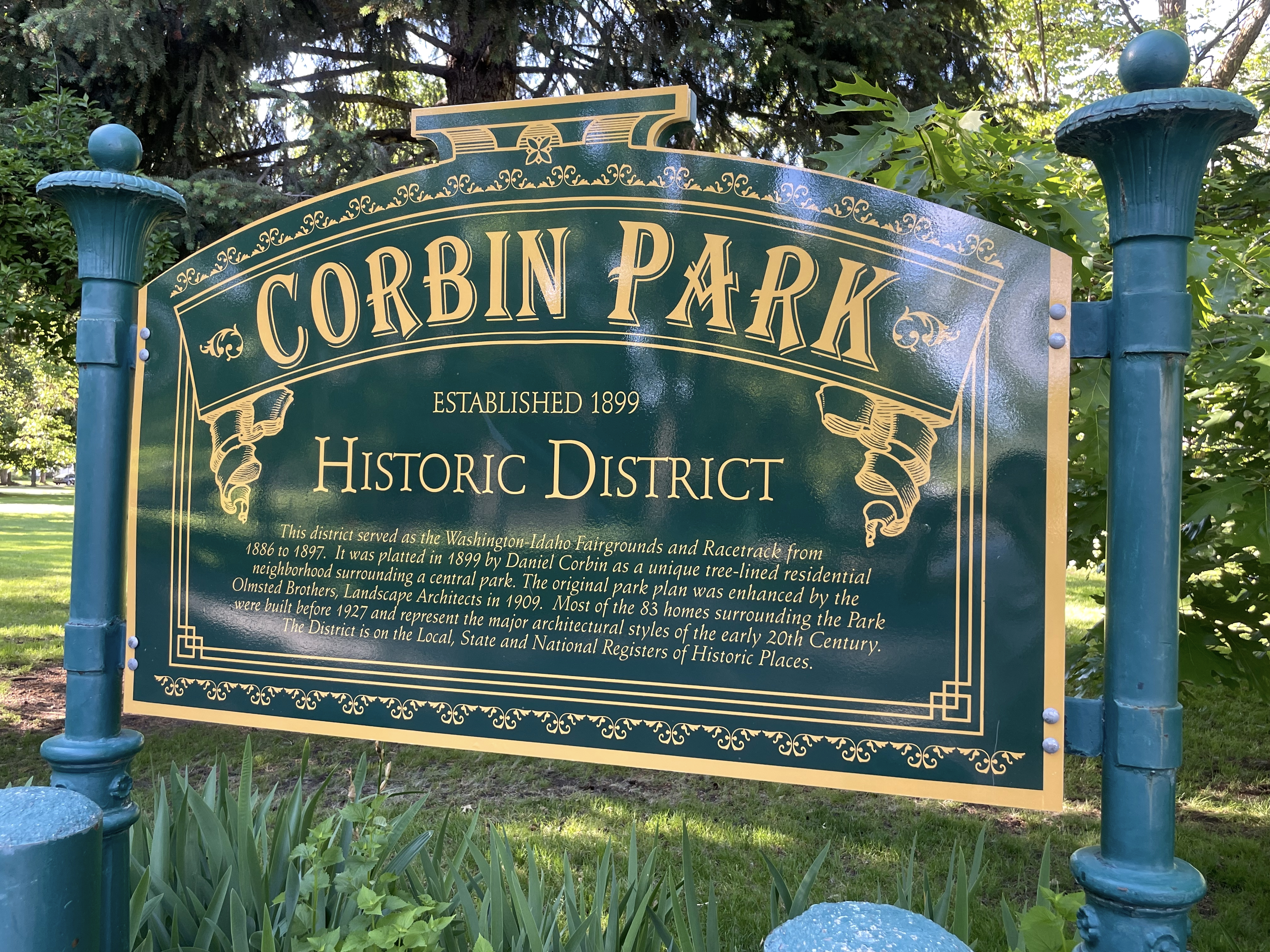
- Welcome sign in Corbin Park
- Location: Emerson/Garfield, Spokane, Washington
- Coordinates: 47°41′05.5″N 117°25′07.1″W
- Area: 35 acres (14 ha)
- Built: 1899-1942
- Architect: Multiple
- Architectural style: American Foursquare, Bungalow, Craftsman, Tudor Revival
- NRHP reference No.: 92001584
- Added to NRHP: November 12, 1992

The Corbin Park Historic District is a 35-acre historic district in the Emerson/Garfield neighborhood of Spokane, Washington. The district has been listed on the National Register of Historic Places (NRHP) since 1992, and is listed on the state and local historic registers as well. It is made up of 87 buildings, 81 of which are considered to be contributing properties to the historic district. It is notable as one of the oldest intact neighborhoods in the city.

Corbin Park sits at the center of the historic district as a four block long and well-forested park between Waverly Place to the south and Park Place to the north, two blocks west of Division Street. The bounds of the district extend one-half block from the park to the north and south and one block from the park to the east and west.

== Setting ==
The Corbin Park Historic District is located in the Emerson/Garfield neighborhood of Spokane just over 1.5 miles north of Downtown Spokane. It spans six blocks east-to-west from Normandie Street to Post Street between the alley north of Park Place to the alley south of Waverly Place, a distance of two city blocks. Corbin Park sits at the center of the district, stretching roughly four blocks east-to-west from East Oval to West Oval and one block north-to south from Park Place to Waverly Place.

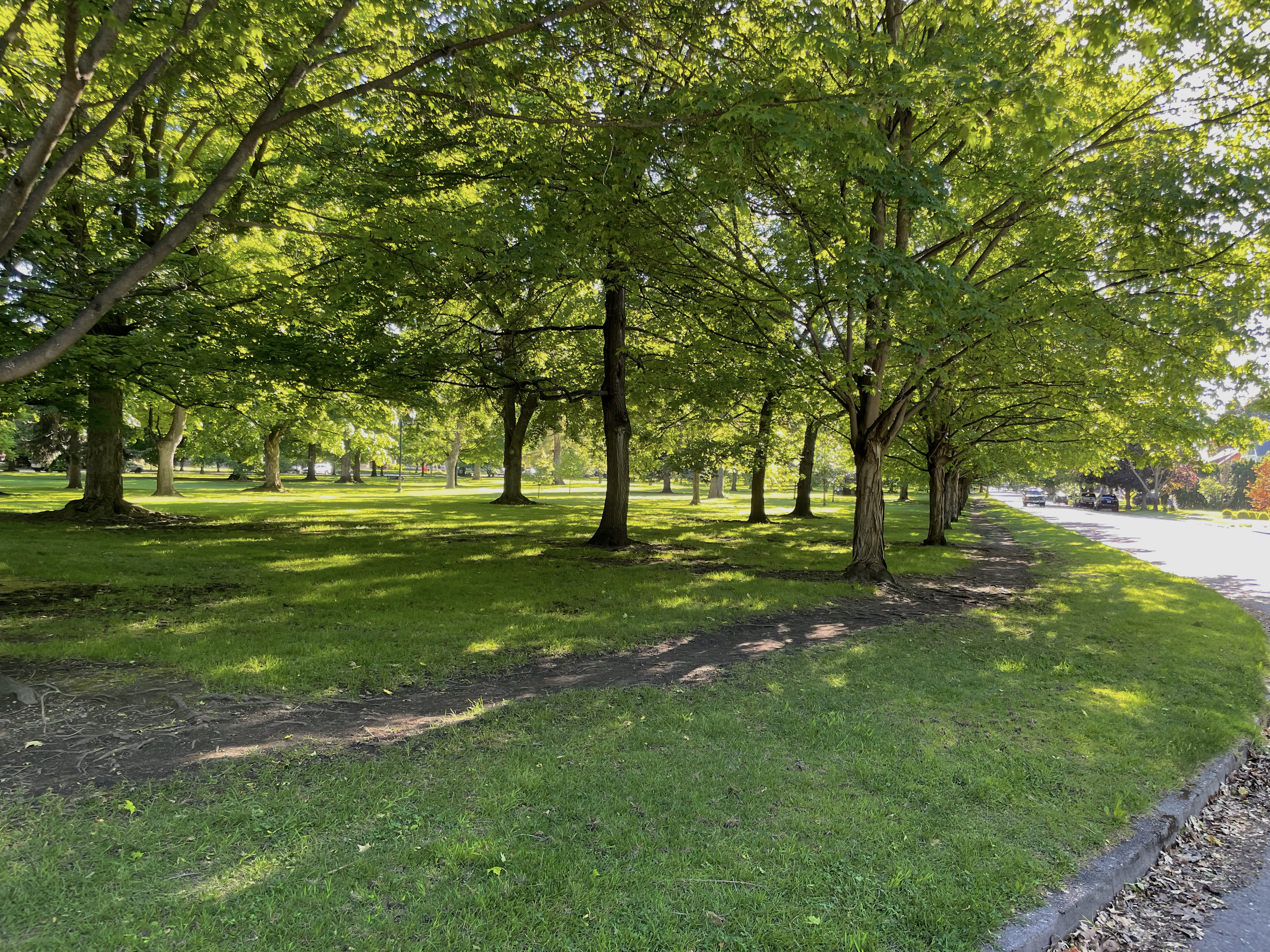
Corbin Park from the northeast

Located in a flat area of the north side of the city, Corbin Park is at 1,905 feet above sea level. The terrain rises dramatically a few blocks to the north towards the North Hill neighborhood, and more gently to the east towards Division Street, the city's major north–south arterial two blocks east of the district. The area veers slightly from the regular street grid, mostly due to Corbin Park interrupting Howard and Washington Streets which do not continue immediately north of the park. Post Street, which marks the western boundary of the historic district, is classified as a minor arterial and provides a direct connection into Downtown Spokane. There is no public transit in the historic district, but the Spokane Transit Authority's bus routes 4, along Monroe Street to the west, 25 along Division Street to the east and 27, along Buckeye Street to the south, each pass within two blocks of the district.

Situated in an area zoned single-family residential, the Corbin Park Historic District is made up of single-family homes surrounding Corbin Park. The park is four blocks long and one block wide. The 11.5 acre park, like the surrounding neighborhood, is heavily covered by a tree canopy. It is otherwise grass-covered with a baseball diamond, tennis courts, basketball court, and a playground.

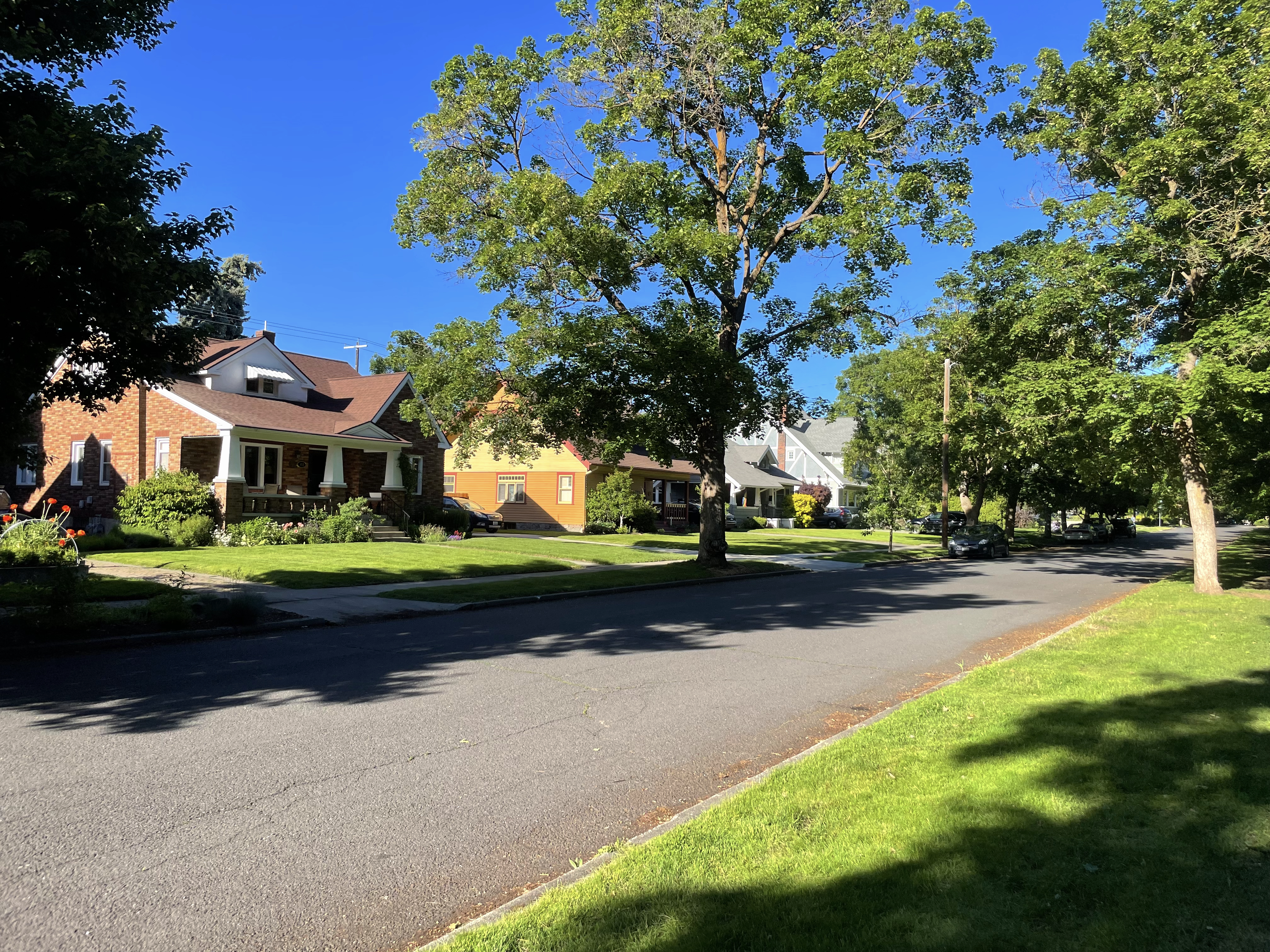
Homes along Park Place

The homes in the historic district are mostly a mix of American Foursquare, Bungalow, Craftsman, and Tudor Revival in style, with a few Dutch Colonial and bungaloids as well. Of the 83 buildings in the district at the time it was listed on the NRHP in 1992, 78 were considered to be contributing properties to the historic nature of the district. The district is shaded by a thick canopy of elm, originally planted in a double-ring around the perimeter of the park, along with ponderosa pine and other conifers as well as ginkgo and many others.

== History ==
What is now the Corbin Park Historic District, like the rest of the city of Spokane and surrounding area, was inhabited by the Spokane people for centuries prior to contact with European settlers.

The Corbin Park Historic District as it exists today began in the late-1800s with the establishment and expansion of the city of Spokane, which was founded at the Spokane Falls approximately one-and-a-half miles south of Corbin Park and incorporated as a city in 1881. What would become the Corbin Park Historic District was subsequently annexed into the city of Spokane on April 22, 1891.

Development of the Corbin Park area began in the late-1880s. Its first use was as the site of the Washington-Idaho Fairgrounds which was organized in 1886. The property was purchased from prominent Spokane pioneer John J. Browne in 1887 — Browne lends his name to another historic district in the city in its Browne's Addition neighborhood. The area was developed into a fairgrounds and a horse racing track, with races documented as early as 1887. Stables, an exhibition hall and a grandstand were constructed alongside the one-mile racetrack. Its time as a fairground and racecourse was short-lived, however, as the events were discontinued in 1897. Two years later the city was presented with a plat for the area by railroad magnate and Spokane pioneer D.C. Corbin in the fall of 1899.

Construction of homes in the area began almost immediately, with most of the homes constructed between 1900 and 1918. 63 of the homes in the district were constructed prior to World War I. As areas closer to the city center such as the prominent and prestigious Browne's Addition, Ninth Avenue Historic District and Marycliff-Cliff Park Historic District began to fill up, Corbin Park was seen as a destination for residents with means who wanted to build sizable homes in the city. The infield area of the former racetrack became what is today Corbin Park, retaining its oval shape as a vestige of its previous use. The streets which border the park follow the former racetrack itself. Corbin gifted the land to the city in 1902 expressly to create a park on the property.

Many of the homes in the area were designed by prominent early Spokane architect W. W. Hyslop while the park itself was designed by the landscape firm of the Olmsted Brothers as part of their grand plan for the city's parks. By 1925 all but 10 of the homes in the district had been constructed, with a few more being built in the 1930s, 1940s and 1950s. In 1992, when the district was nominated to the NRHP, none of the homes in the district had been lost to fire or demolition, making it a strong example of a fully-intact early 1990s upper-middle class residential neighborhood in the Spokane area.

== Gallery ==
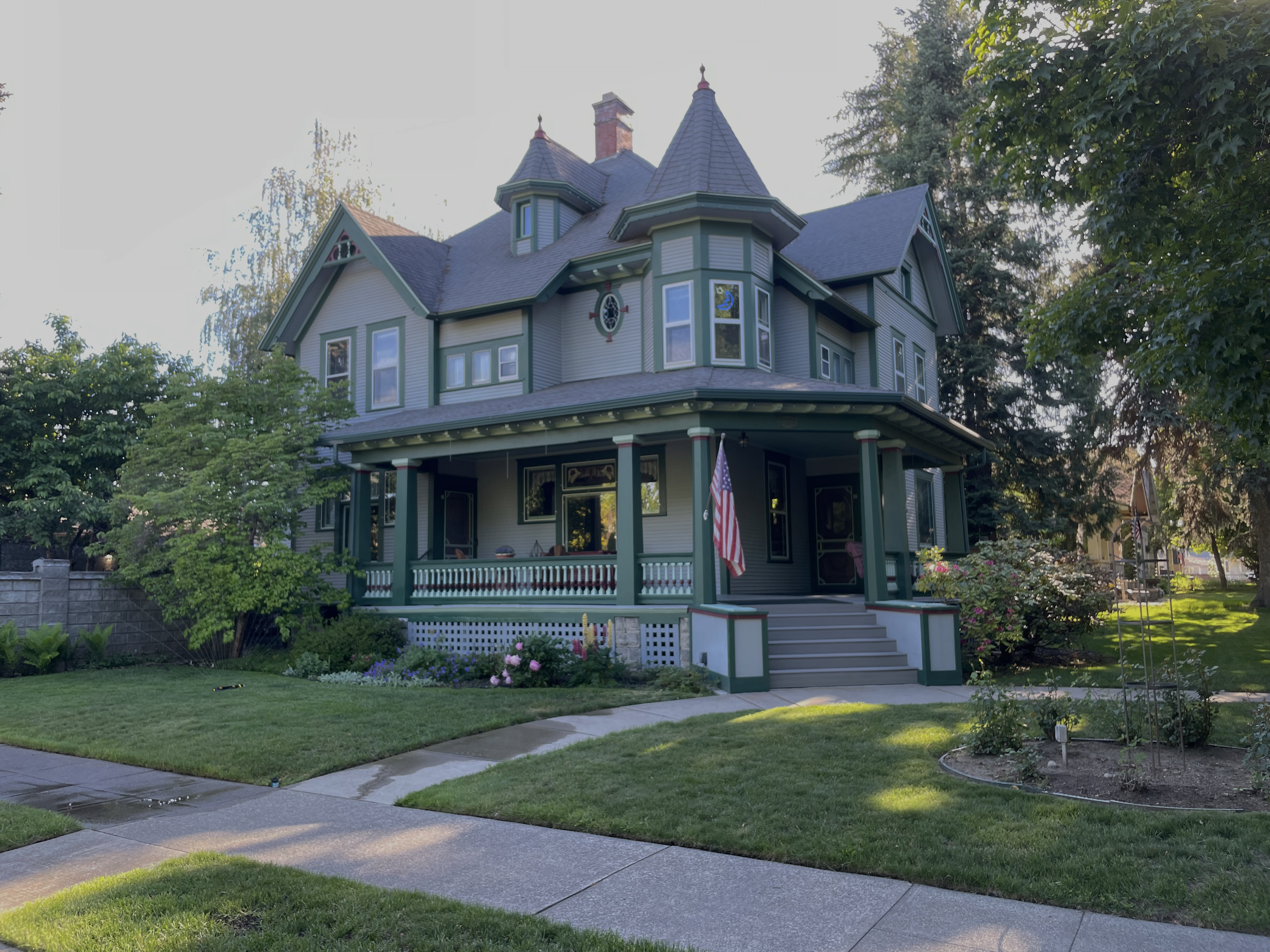
Queen Anne home on Waverly Place

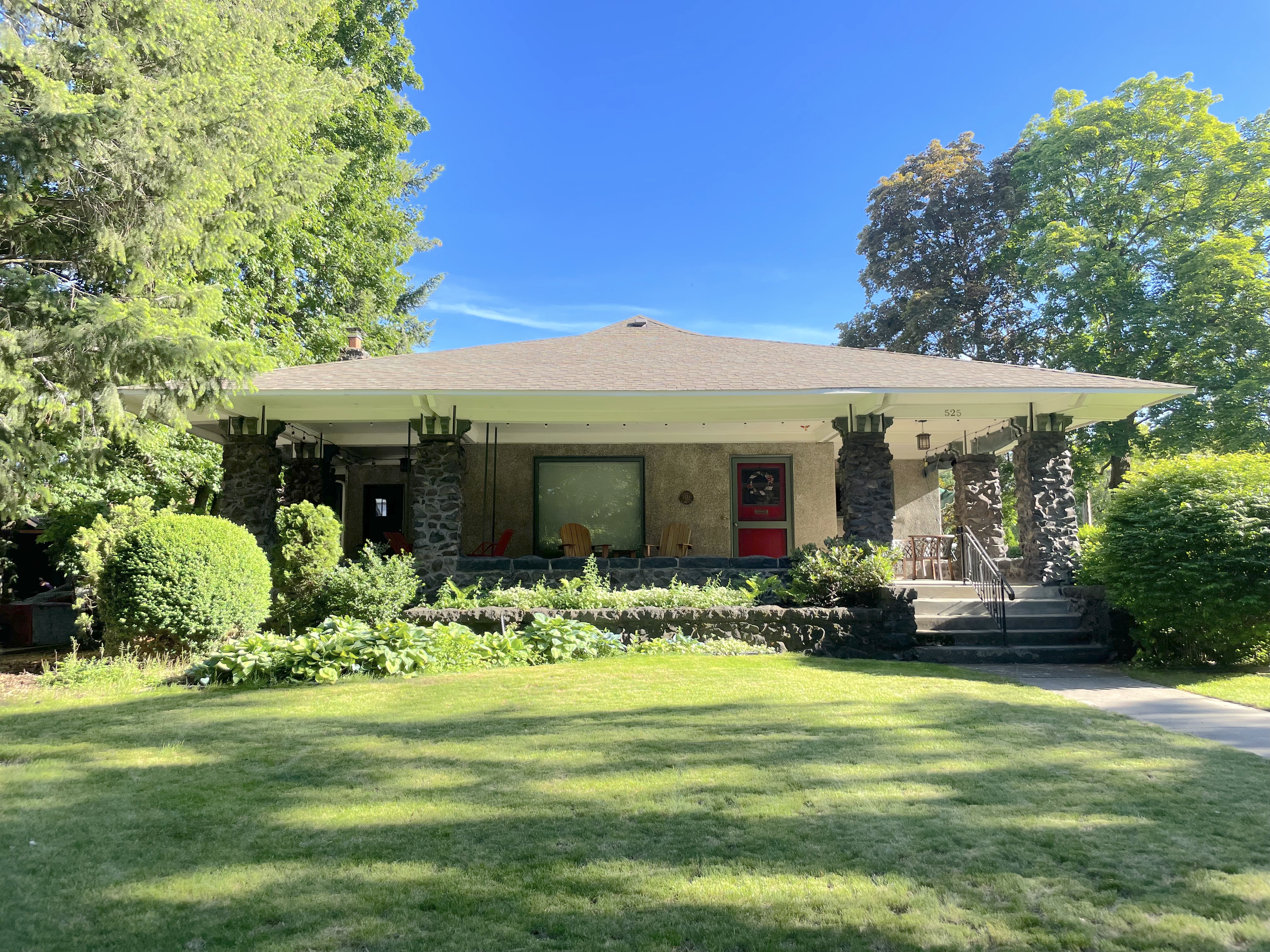
Bungaloid home on Waverly Place

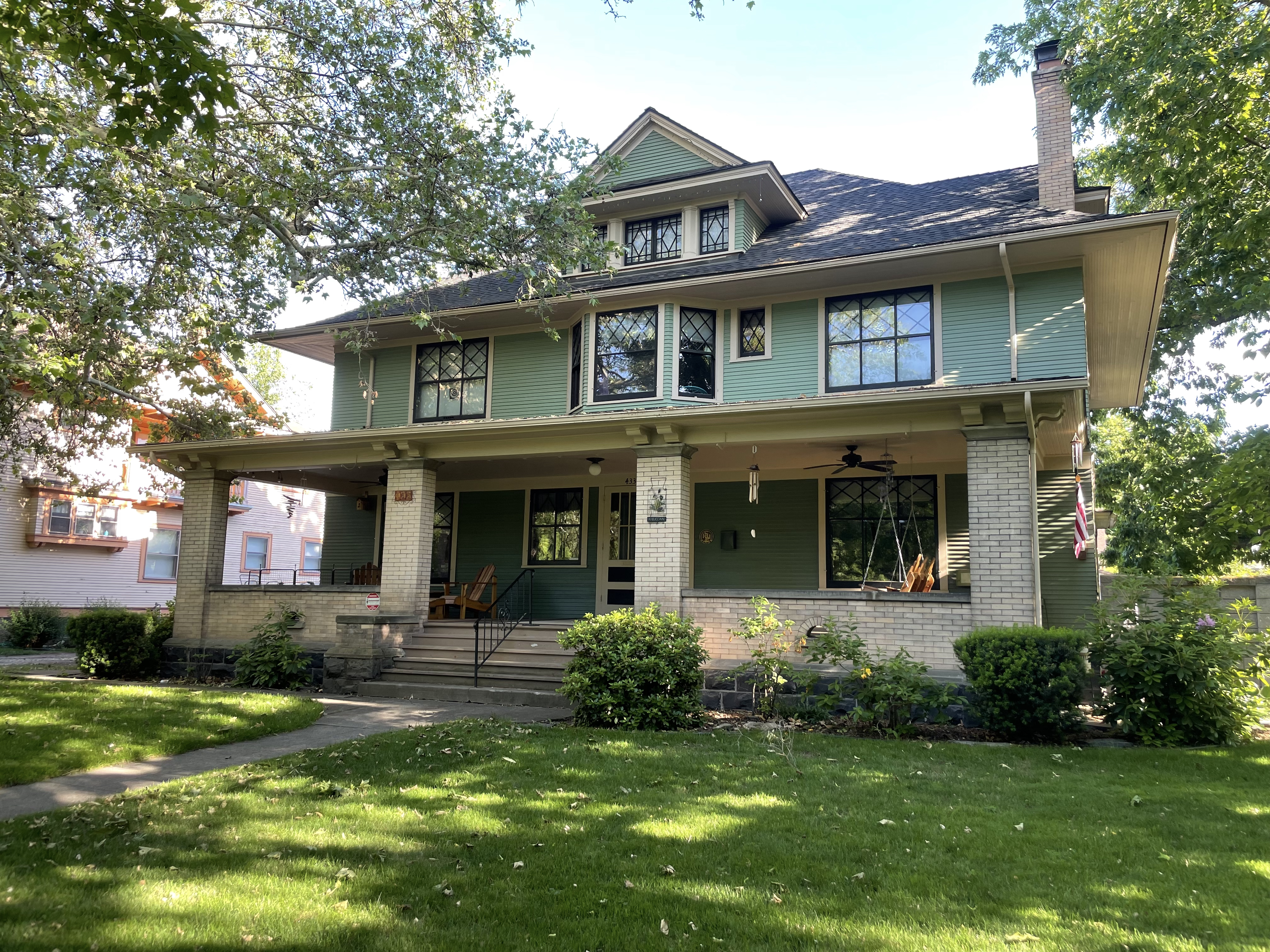
American Foursquare home on Waverly Place

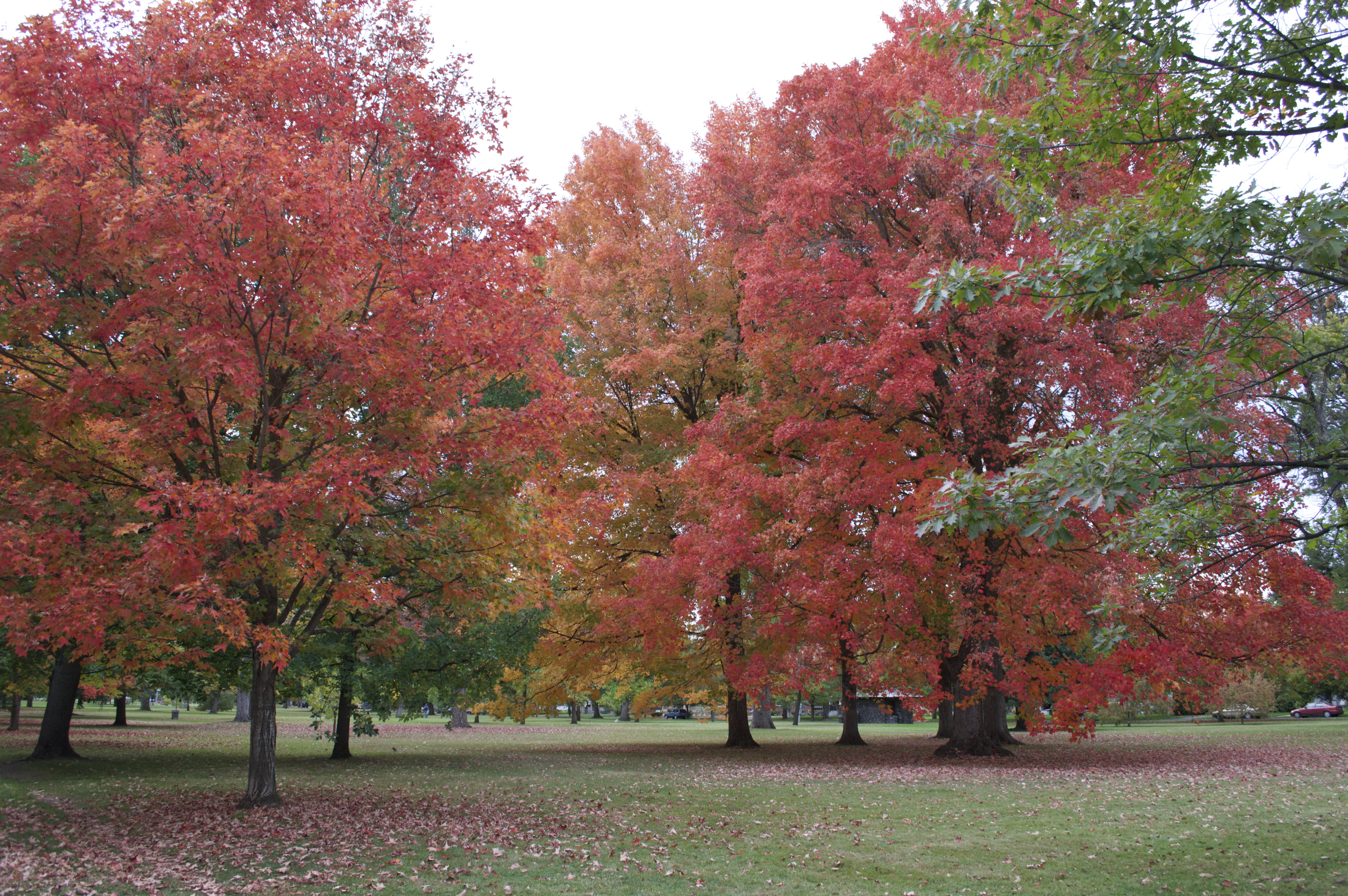
Corbin Park during the fall

== See also ==
- Emerson/Garfield, Spokane
- National Register of Historic Places listings in Spokane County, Washington
