= Hutton Building =

- U.S. National Register of Historic Places
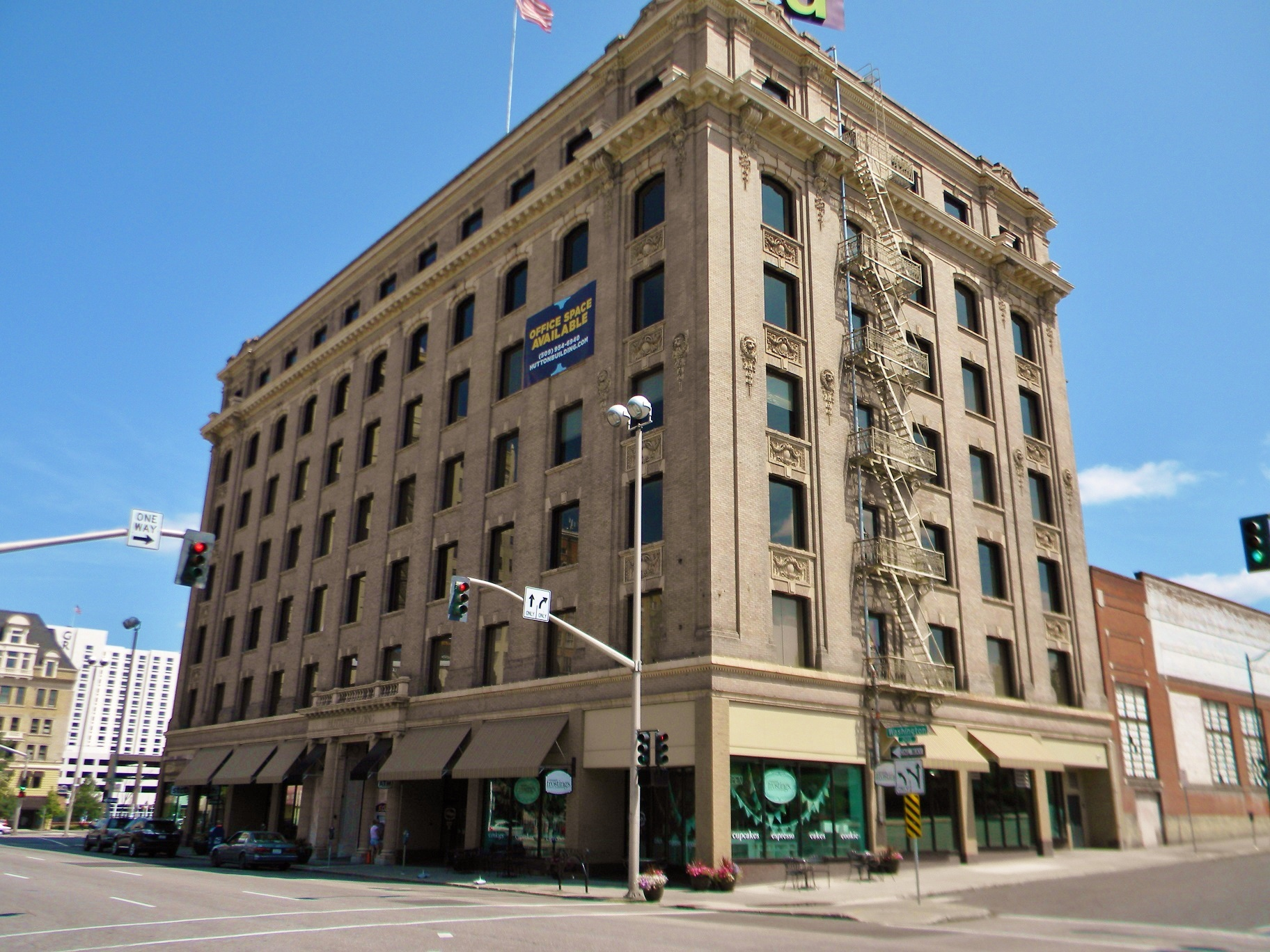
- The building in 2015

- Location within Spokane riverfront area
- Location: 9 South Washington Street, Spokane, Washington
- Coordinates: 47°39′25″N 117°25′00″W
- Area: 0.3 acres (0.12 ha)
- Built: 1907
- Architect: Hubbell & Dow
- Architectural style: Classical Revival
- NRHP reference No.: 83004037
- Added to NRHP: January 27, 1983

The Hutton Building is a historic seven-story building in Spokane, Washington. It was designed by Hubbell & Dow in the Classical Revival style, and built as a four-story building in 1906-1907 for Levi Hutton and his wife, May Arkwright Hutton. Three more stories were added in 1910. The Huttons lived in the penthouse. The building has been listed on the National Register of Historic Places since January 27, 1983.
