= Christ the Redeemer Church (Spokane, Washington) =

Historic church in Washington, United States

- Christ the Redeemer Church formerly Grace Baptist Church
- U.S. National Register of Historic Places
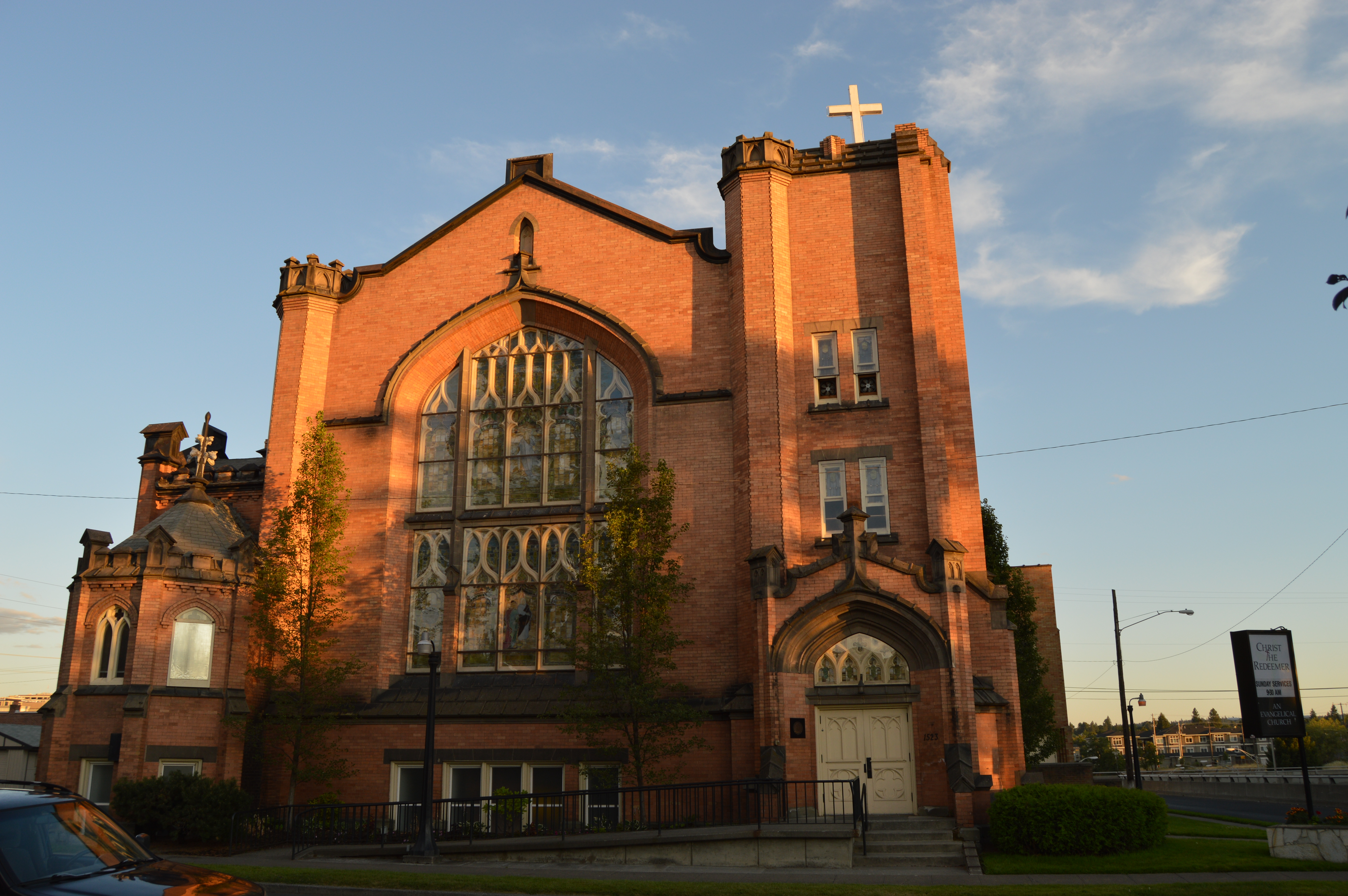

- Location within Spokane riverfront area
- Location: 1527 W. Mallon St., Spokane, Washington
- Coordinates: 47°39′55″N 117°26′3″W
- Area: less than one acre
- Built: 1905–1911
- Built by: J.W. White
- Architect: John K. Dow
- Architectural style: Late Gothic Revival
- NRHP reference No.: 92001289
- Added to NRHP: October 2, 1992

Christ the Redeemer Church in West Central, Spokane, Washington is a historic church located at 1527 W. Mallon Street. Built as the North Side Baptist Church in 1911 in a Late Gothic Revival style and was added to the National Register in 1992 under the name Grace Baptist Church, the church is today an independent evangelical church loosely connected to Moore Theological College.

== History ==
Founded after the Great Spokane Fire of 1889, the North Side Baptist Church grew rapidly during Spokane's boom period. It initially met in the Spokane County Courthouse. By 1903, the church had hundreds of members, had established several missions, and had commissioned J. K. Dow to design a large church in what is today West Central. The church's National Register listing described it as "one of the most substantial structures on the growing north side, and one of the finest churches in the city. Today, it retains excellent integrity, and is distinguished by its arched openings, buttresses, battlemented parapets, stained glass, and dramatic interior auditorium."

Christ the Redeemer Church began in 1993 when a group of families at the Cathedral of St. John the Evangelist adopted an evangelical theological outlook. After their request to plant a new Episcopal mission church was rejected by the bishop of Spokane, the group of 17 adults and 20 children began meeting in private homes. The church incorporated in 1994 under the name Christ the Redeemer. One of the founders read about Michael Youssef, who had a few years prior left the Episcopal Diocese of Atlanta and planted Church of the Apostles as an independent congregation. Youssef recommended that Christ the Redeemer contact Moore Theological College. In 1994, Sydney Archbishop Donald Robinson visited Spokane to teach, preach, and celebrate communion for Christ the Redeemer. Robinson later sent Peter Hayward—a future Bishop of Wollongong in the Diocese of Sydney—to serve as pastor of Christ the Redeemer. Hayward and both of his successors as pastor of Christ the Redeemer are Moore Theological College graduates.

In the late 1990s, Christ the Redeemer moved away from historic Anglican practices like having a vestry, the importance of bishops, infant baptism, and the theology of Holy Communion toward its present independent reformed, evangelical stance. In the early 2000s, Christ the Redeemer began renting space from Grace Baptist. After Grace Baptist's pastor retired, the churches began worshiping together for an interim period, after which the congregations merged and Christ the Redeemer became the owner of the historic Grace Baptist building.

== Theology ==
Despite its connection to Sydney Anglicanism, Christ the Redeemer is an independent, non-denominational church. It adheres to Reformed theology, credobaptist practice, plural male eldership, and expository preaching.
