= John K. Dow =

American architect

- Born: September 21, 1861 or 1862; Gaylord, Minnesota, U.S.
- Died: June 2, 1961; Kirkland, Washington, U.S.
- Occupation: Architect

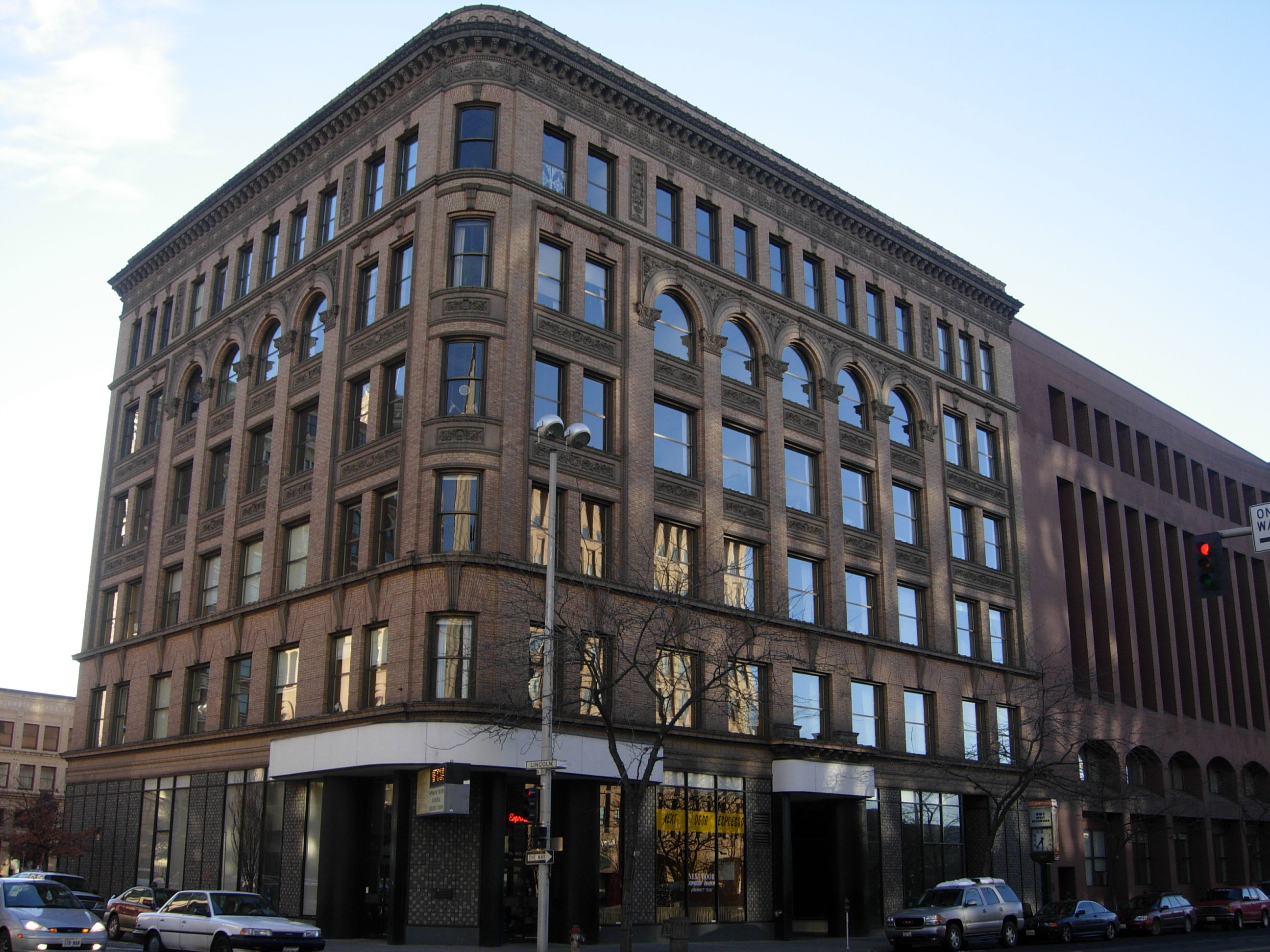
The Empire State Building, designed by Dow.

John K. Dow (1861-1961) was an American architect. He designed the NRHP-listed Coolidge–Rising House, the NRHP-listed Grace Baptist Church, and the NRHP-listed Empire State Building. With Loren L. Rand, he designed the NRHP-listed Bump Block-Bellevue House-Hawthorne Hotel. With Clarence Z. Hubbell, he designed the NRHP-listed Hutton Building. They also designed Van Doren Hall and the Veterinary Science Building on the campus of Washington State University in Pullman, Washington.
