= Audubon/Downriver, Spokane =

Audubon/Downriver
- Neighborhood
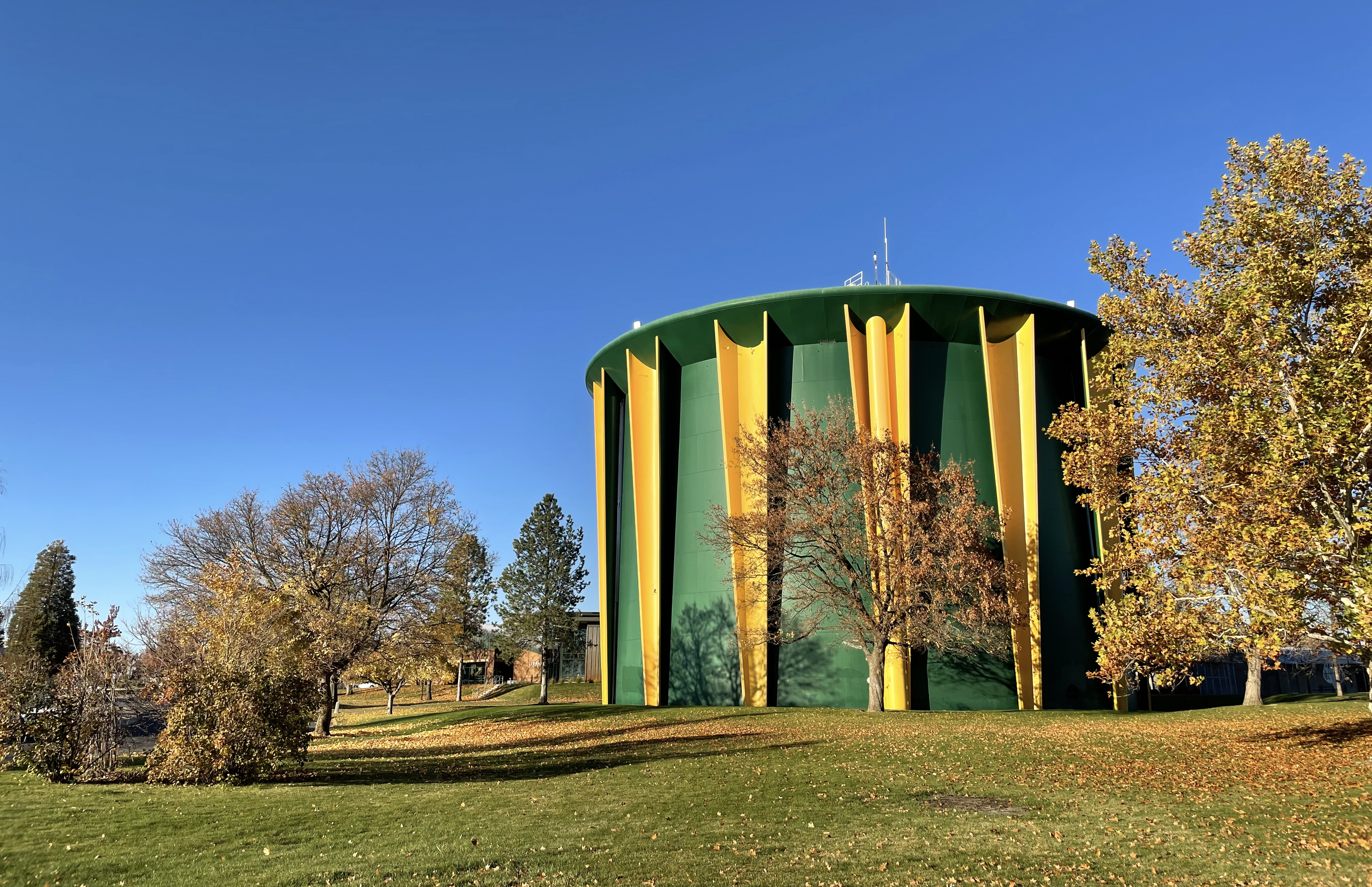
- Water tower in Shadle Park, a neighborhood landmark.

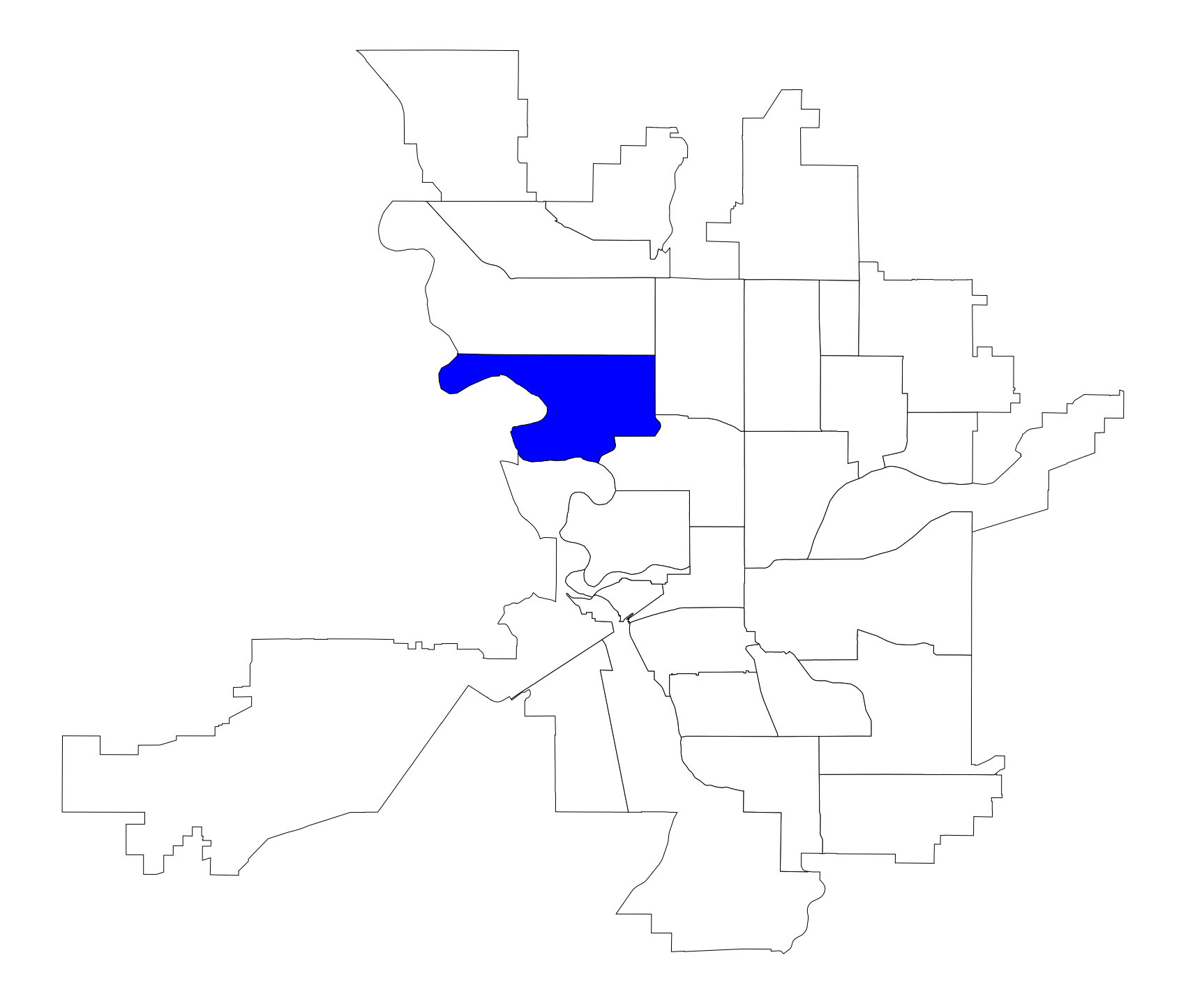
- Location within the city of Spokane
- Coordinates: 47°41′37″N 117°27′11″W
- Country: United States
- State: Washington
- County: Spokane
- City: Spokane

Population (2017)
  - Total: 8,813

Demographics 2017
  - White: 90.3%
  - Latinx: 5.2%
  - Asian: 1.5%
  - American Indian/Alaska Native: 1.3%
  - Black: 1.2%
- Time zone: UTC-8 (PST)
  - Summer (DST): UTC-7 (PDT)
- ZIP Codes: 99205
- Area code: 509

Audubon/Downriver is a neighborhood in Spokane, Washington, located on the northwest side of the city. There is a diversity of land use in the neighborhood, with single-family residential areas dating from the early 20th century through the Post–World War II economic expansion era, regionally important commercial districts, smaller neighborhood retail areas, numerous schools, large parks, a golf course, conservation areas and part of Riverside State Park along the Spokane River. The neighborhood is the site of the corporate offices for Rosauers Supermarkets, a regional grocery store chain with stores located across the Northwestern United States.

The neighborhood's name comes from two areas within its bounds, Audubon Park and the Downriver area, so named for being located downriver from Downtown Spokane.

== History ==
The Spokane people have lived in what is now Audubon/Downriver for hundreds of years. They fished and camped along the banks of the Spokane river and gathered edible crops near a natural spring now known as Drumheller Springs. A trail passed through the neighborhood, giving its name to the North Indian Trail and South Indian Trail neighborhoods to the north. With the arrival of European settlers, prospectors and pioneers began using the trail as well, as it connected Spokane House at the mouth of the Little Spokane River with the settlement of Spokan Falls at the Falls of the Spokane River in present-day Downtown Spokane.

Spokane Garry, a prominent member of the Spokane tribe who, as a young man, was given a European education in Manitoba, built a longhouse used as a school at Drumheller Springs in 1860. It was the first school established in what is now Spokane. The springs remained a gathering place for the Spokane people until the 1930s.

As the city grew out from its original site along the Spokane Falls in the 1880s, the springs were used to provide water for the expanding city. At this time, pioneer Dan Drumheller located a slaughterhouse in the area, using the water from the springs in the operation.

Residential development intensified in Audubon/Downriver in the early 1900s. In 1905, Frank P. Hogan and John A. Finch, early Spokane developers and businessmen, donated 33 acres to the city, which became Audubon Park. The donation was made with an agreement that the city would provide landscaping and improvements to benefit the park and Hogan and Finch's housing developments in the area. Finch Elementary, located at the northern edge, was named in his honor. When the Olmsted Brothers gave their 1908 report to the city designing the park system, they included Audubon Park. During the first decades of the 20th century, multiple streetcar lines were laid through the neighborhood. By 1923 streetcar lines stretched from downtown along Northwest Boulevard almost to Garland and from Northwest Boulevard north along Driscoll Boulevard beyond the northern bounds of the present neighborhood. Downriver Golf Course was opened in 1926 along a bend in the Spokane River.

The post-World War II housing boom brought further changes to Audubon/Downriver as growth accelerated within the neighborhood and stretching north. In 1944, Josie Comstock Shadle, the late wife of Spokane businessman Eugene A. Shadle, donated land to the city to honor her husband, that became the large Shadle Park in the northeast corner of the neighborhood. In 1957, Shadle Park High School, Spokane's fourth, was built on the park's east side to accommodate the increase in growth in and around the neighborhood. Glover Middle School, named after James N. Glover, the founder of Spokane, was built across Shadle Park from the high school one year later. To the east of Shadle Park along Wellesley Avenue, the Shadle Center was opened in 1961 and quickly became a major shopping district for the northwest side of Spokane. It was the first major shopping center outside of the city center. Shadle Center began to decline after being sold to a Los Angeles investment group in 1976. Many of the department stores that were tenants, such as JCPenney, began to shutter their doors. Competition from NorthTown Mall, about a mile east along Wellesley Avenue, proved too much to contend with. However, reinvestment in the first decade of the 21st century revitalized Shadle Center, and as of 2022, it remains one of the north side's top retail areas.

A 2003 bond measure led to the modernization of Shadle Park High School, which was completed in 2009. The Shadle Park branch of the Spokane Public Library was renovated in 2021.

Prior to 2015, Audubon/Downriver was part of the larger Northwest neighborhood. The two were split at Wellesley Avenue in 2015, with the northern half retaining the Northwest name.

== Geography ==
=== Physical geography ===
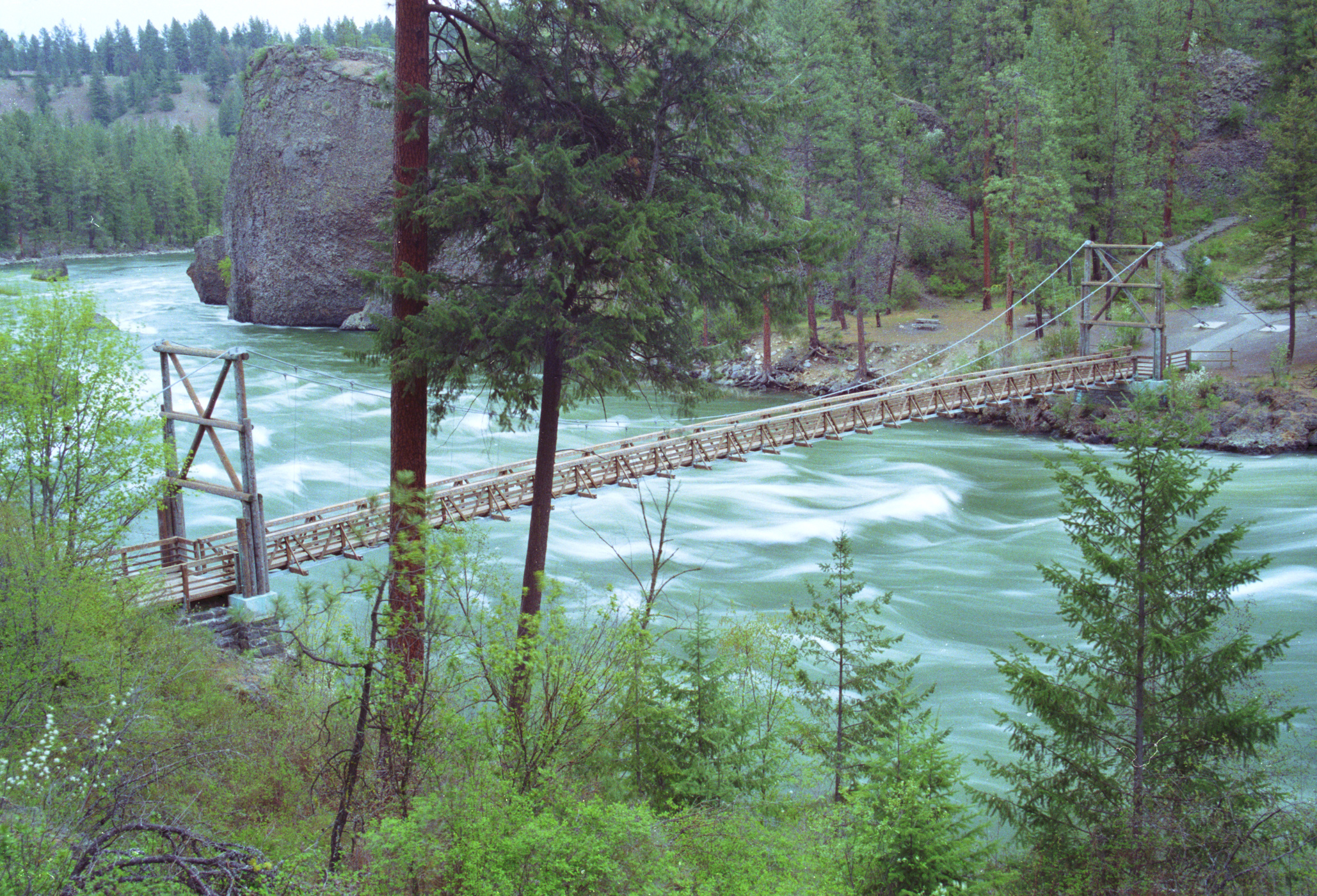
Suspension bridge in Riverside State Park, looking towards Audubon/Downriver.

Audubon/Downriver is defined by two areas of dramatically different topographical relief. The deep and steep gorge cut by the Spokane River defines the neighborhood's western boundary while most of the built-up area is located on a relatively flat tableland that slopes up gently to the northeast.

The Spokane River enters the neighborhood at roughly 1,680 feet above sea level and falls roughly 80 feet before leaving the neighborhood. It cuts a gorge that rises rapidly and steeply on the Audubon/Downriver side. In the far northwest of the neighborhood, the bluff rises nearly 300 feet over a horizontal distance of roughly 500 feet. The bluff is less steep in the southwestern area of the neighborhood, where the public Downriver Golf Course and Downriver Disc Golf Course are located.

Away from the river, however, the terrain is comparably quite flat. The bluff that runs east-west across the north side of the city peters out at the Drumheller Springs, near the neighborhood's eastern border. While the terrain climbs 300 feet over a distance of just 500 feet in places along the river, it climbs less than 200 feet from the crest of the river bluff to the neighborhood's high point in the northeast.

Audubon/Downriver lies within the Okanagan dry forests ecoregion, part of the broader temperate coniferous forest biome. The Okanagan dry forests extend from just south of Spokane northwest through the Okanagan to the Thompson Plateau in British Columbia. Within the developed area of the neighborhood, vestiges of the pre-development ecoregion are visible in the tall ponderosa pine trees, which are common throughout the neighborhood. More intact examples of the ecoregion can be seen in conservation areas such as Drumheller Springs, Downriver Park, and Riverside State Park.

=== Human geography ===
Wellesley Avenue bounds the neighborhood on the north, separating it from the Northwest neighborhood. Ash Street forms the eastern border, separating it from North Hill and Emerson/Garfield. Fairview Avenue marks the southern boundary from Ash Street west to T.J. Meenach Drive, which it then follows south for a few blocks to the Spokane River, which then defines the border northwest to Wellesley Avenue.

Almost all of the Audubon/Downriver is zoned as single-family residential. The Shadle Center shopping district, along Wellesley Avenue from Alberta to Belt Streets, is zoned for commercial as a district center. There are also a few neighborhood retail commercial zones with restaurants, shops, and services in the neighborhood, such as at Wellesley and Assembly, Northwest Boulevard, and F Street, along Garland extending a few blocks west from the Garland District in neighboring North Hill, and the easternmost stretch of Northwest Boulevard.

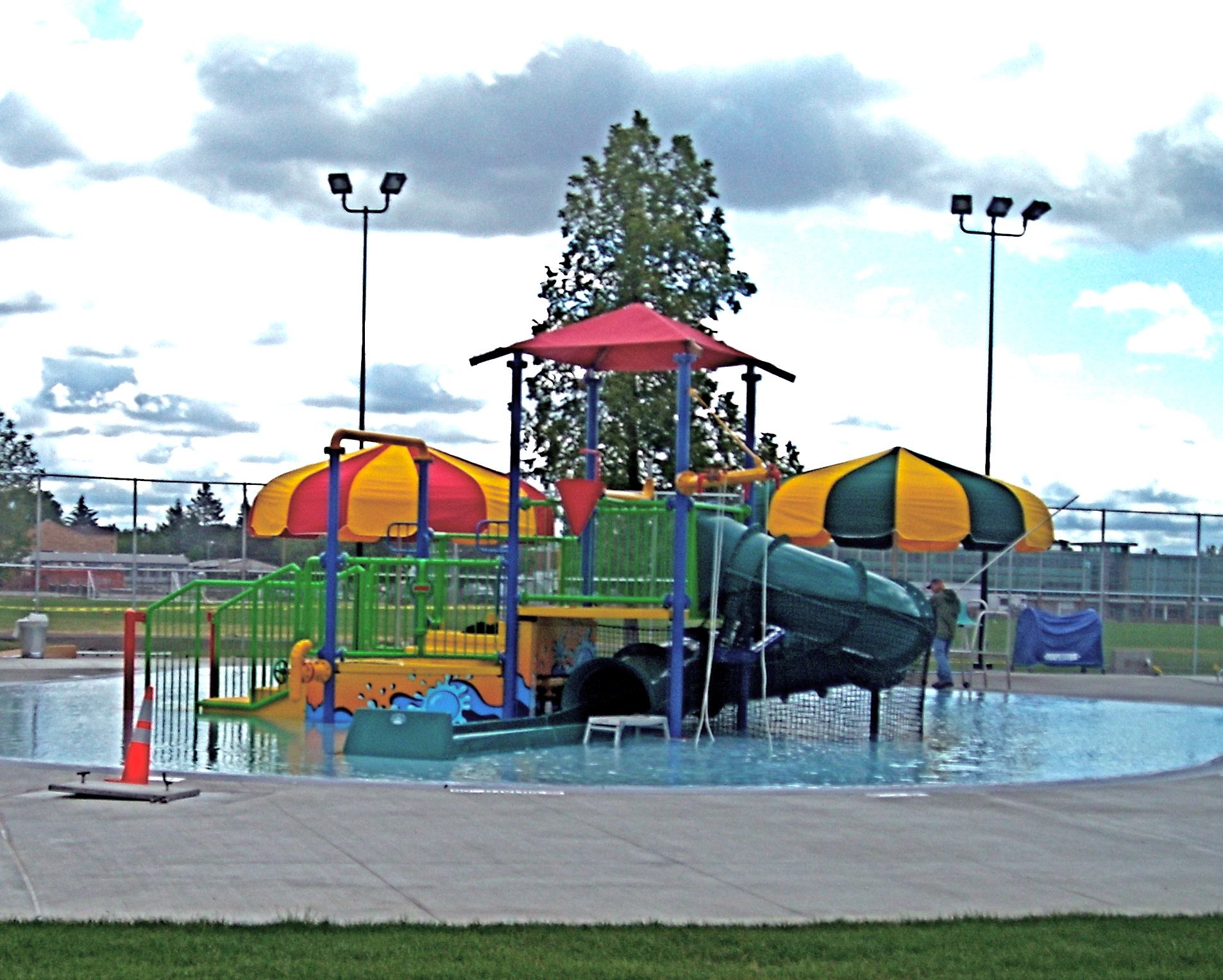
The Shadle Park aquatic center slides

Shadle Park is the largest in the neighborhood at 40 acres and the most developed. Shadle Park is home to baseball, softball, basketball, tennis and track sporting facilities. It has a branch of the Spokane Public Library, a theater stage, gazebo shelters, picnic areas, treed lawns, and an aquatic center with a lap pool and water slides. It is also the site of the neighborhood's iconic mid-century green and gold water tower. The 27.6 acre Audubon Park, a community park, has baseball and softball fields, a playground, basketball court, wading pool, picnic area and treed lawns. The 2.3 acre Webster Park, taking up one full city block, is a neighborhood park with a softball field, playground, and treed lawn. Downriver Park is mostly undeveloped conservation land covering 95.3 acres along the Spokane River in the southwest of the neighborhood, with an 18 hole disc golf course. Drumheller Springs is undeveloped conservation land that covers 12 acres. Surrounded by the Downriver Park conservation area is the public, 18 hole Downriver Golf Course.

Riverside State Park extends into the neighborhood, downstream of Downriver Park, with campsites at the popular Bowl and Pitcher formation in the Spokane River. Unlike the city parks, state parks charge a fee for users who wish to park or camp on site.

Between Downriver Park and Riverside State Park along the riverbank is the Riverside Park Water Reclamation Facility, the largest and oldest wastewater treatment plant in the city.

== Demographics ==
As of 2017, there were 8,813 residents in the neighborhood across 3,732 households, of which 28.2% had children. 19.6% of households were rented, compared to 45.3% citywide. 24.6% of the residents were aged 19 or younger, compared to 21.9% citywide. Those over 65 made up 15.7% of the population, compared to 14.5% citywide. The median household income was $56,444, compared to $44,768 citywide. 31.6% of the population has a bachelor's degree or higher, while 21.4% have at most a high school diploma. The unemployment rate was 3.2% compared to 6.5% citywide. 53.4% of students qualify for free or reduced lunch, compared to 54.5% citywide. 96.2% of residents were born in the United States or one of its territories. Of those born elsewhere, 17% from the United Kingdom, 10.4% from Germany, 10.1% from Mexico and 8.9% from Japan.

== Education ==
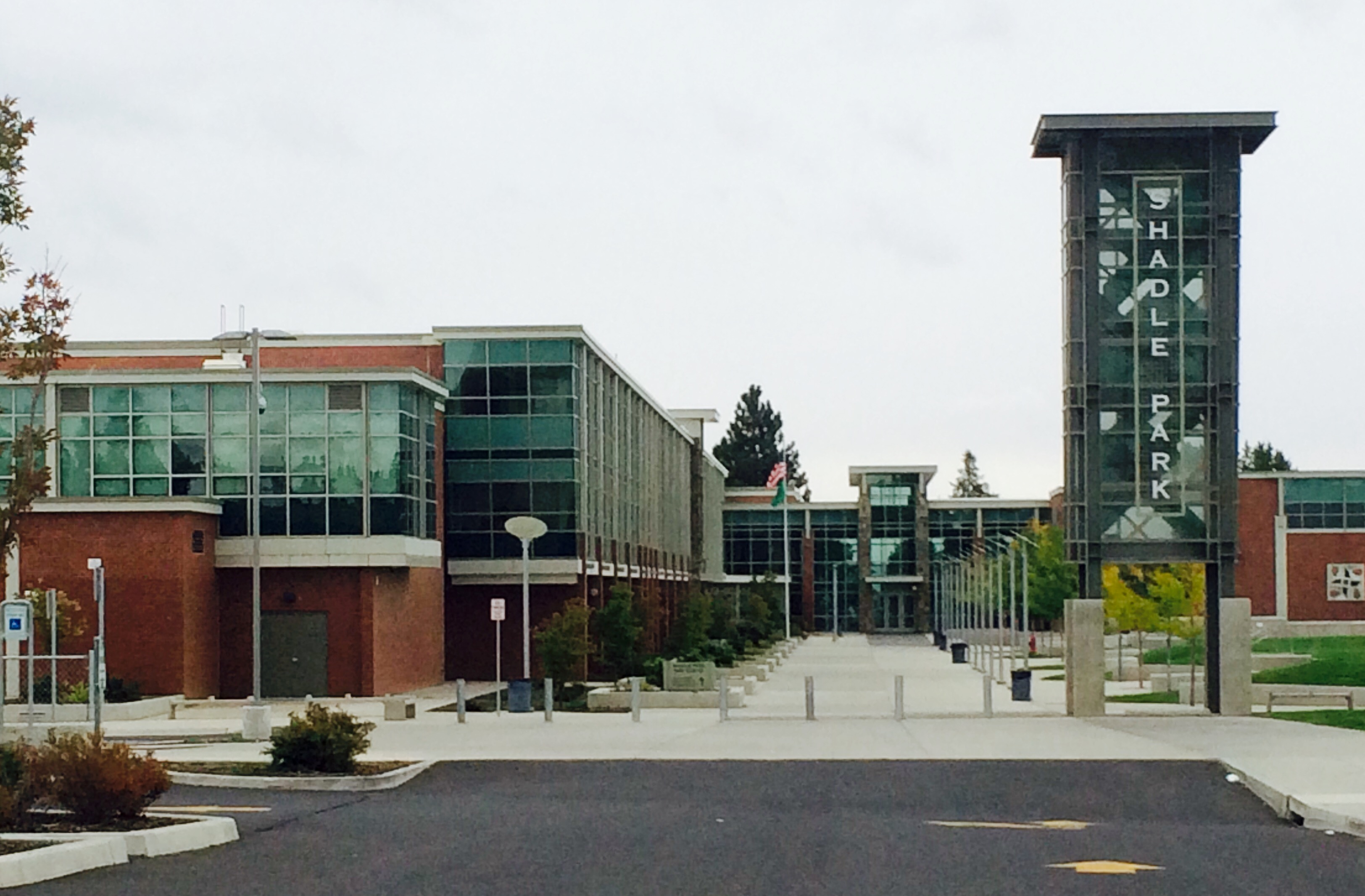
Shadle Park High School

There are four schools in Audubon/Downriver, three public and one private. The public schools are part of the Spokane School District.

Finch Elementary, located in the neighborhood, serves the bulk of Audubon/Downriver. Audubon Elementary is not located within the neighborhood but serves the southeastern portion of the neighborhood. Willard Elementary, also not in Audubon/Downriver, serves a few square blocks in the northeast of the neighborhood. All three feed into Glover Middle School, which is located in the neighborhood. The northwesternmost portion of Audubon/Downriver is part of the Browne Elementary district, which is located a few blocks north of Audubon/Downriver. Browne feeds into Pauline Flett Middle School, located just north of Audubon/Downriver on Wellesley. Even though Shadle Park High School is located in Audubon/Downriver, it only serves a small portion of the neighborhood that feeds through Pauline Flett Middle School. The rest of Audubon/Downriver feeds into North Central High School.

== Transportation ==
=== Surface streets ===
With the exception of some areas along the steep and winding Spokane River bluff, Audubon/Downriver is integrated into the city's street grid. Though Northwest Boulevard and Driscoll Boulevard cut across the grid diagonally from the southeast to the northwest. T.J. Meenach Drive, Northwest Boulevard, Ash Street and Wellesley Avenue are all classified by the city as principal arterials. Alberta Street, Driscoll Boulevard and Garland Avenue are classified as minor arterials. Downriver Drive and the Aubrey L. White Parkway, which wind along the river, are classified as major collectors, as are A and Belt Streets, while G Street is a minor collector. All other streets are considered local access roads.

There are dedicated bike lanes running along Northwest and Driscoll Boulevards. Belt, A and G Streets carry shared roadway bike routes.

=== Public transit ===
Audubon/Downriver is served by the Spokane Transit Authority, like the rest of the Spokane metropolitan area, with three fixed-route bus lines passing through the neighborhood.

Route	Termini			Service operation and notes	Streets traveled
33; Wellesley	West Hills; Spokane Falls Community College	↔	Chief Garry Park; Spokane Community College	High-frequency route	T.J. Meenach Drive, Cochran Street, Driscoll Boulevard, Wellesley Avenue
22; Northwest Boulevard	Downtown Spokane; STA Plaza	↔	Balboa/South Indian Trail; Five Mile Park & Ride	Basic-frequency route	Northwest Boulevard, G Street, Wellesley Avenue
23; Maple/Ash	Downtown Spokane; STA Plaza	↔	North Indian Trail; Meadowglen Park	Basic-frequency route	Maple/Ash couplet
