= North Hill, Spokane =

North Hill
- Spokane Neighborhood
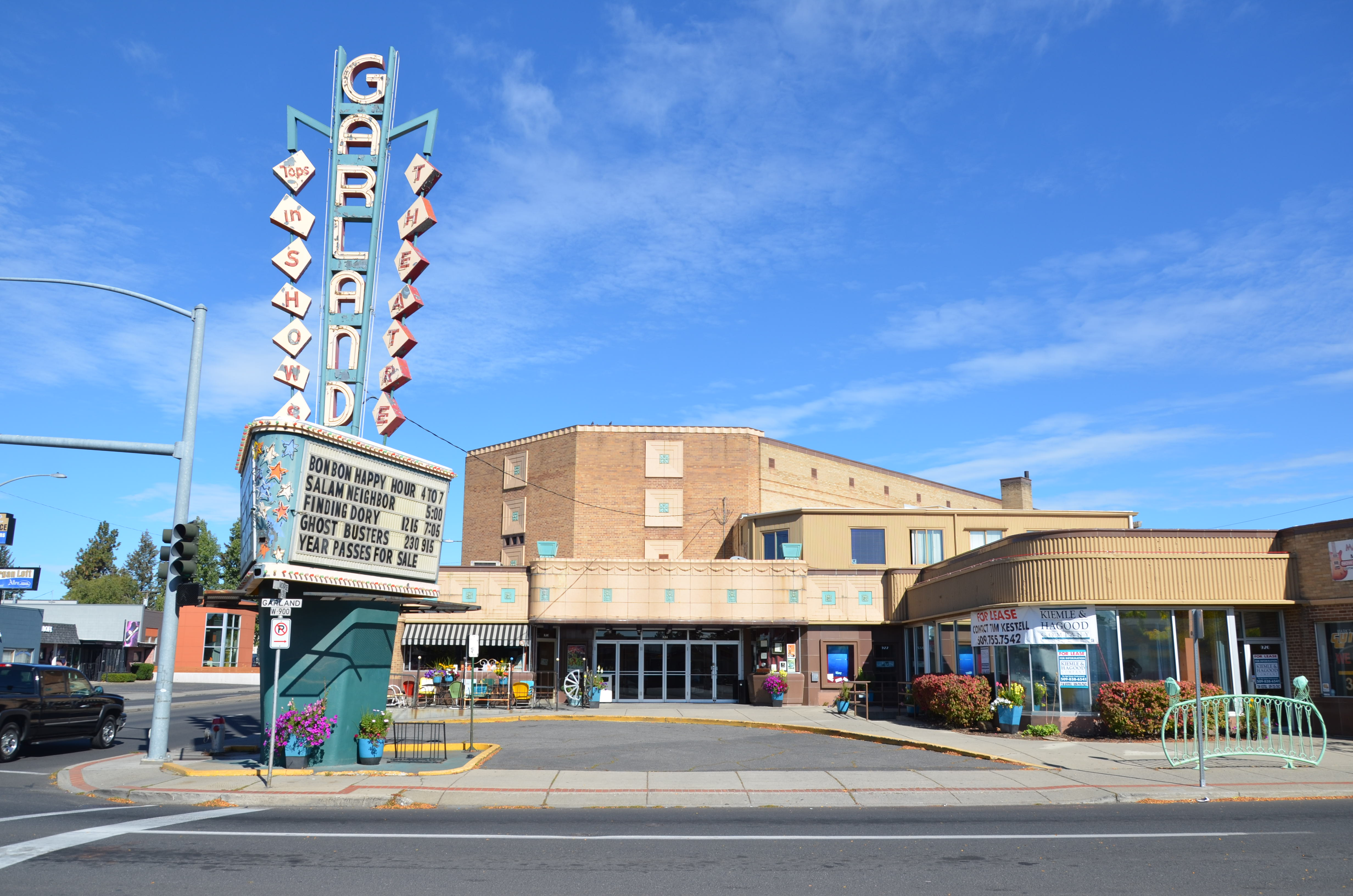
- Garland Theater in Garland District, North Hill

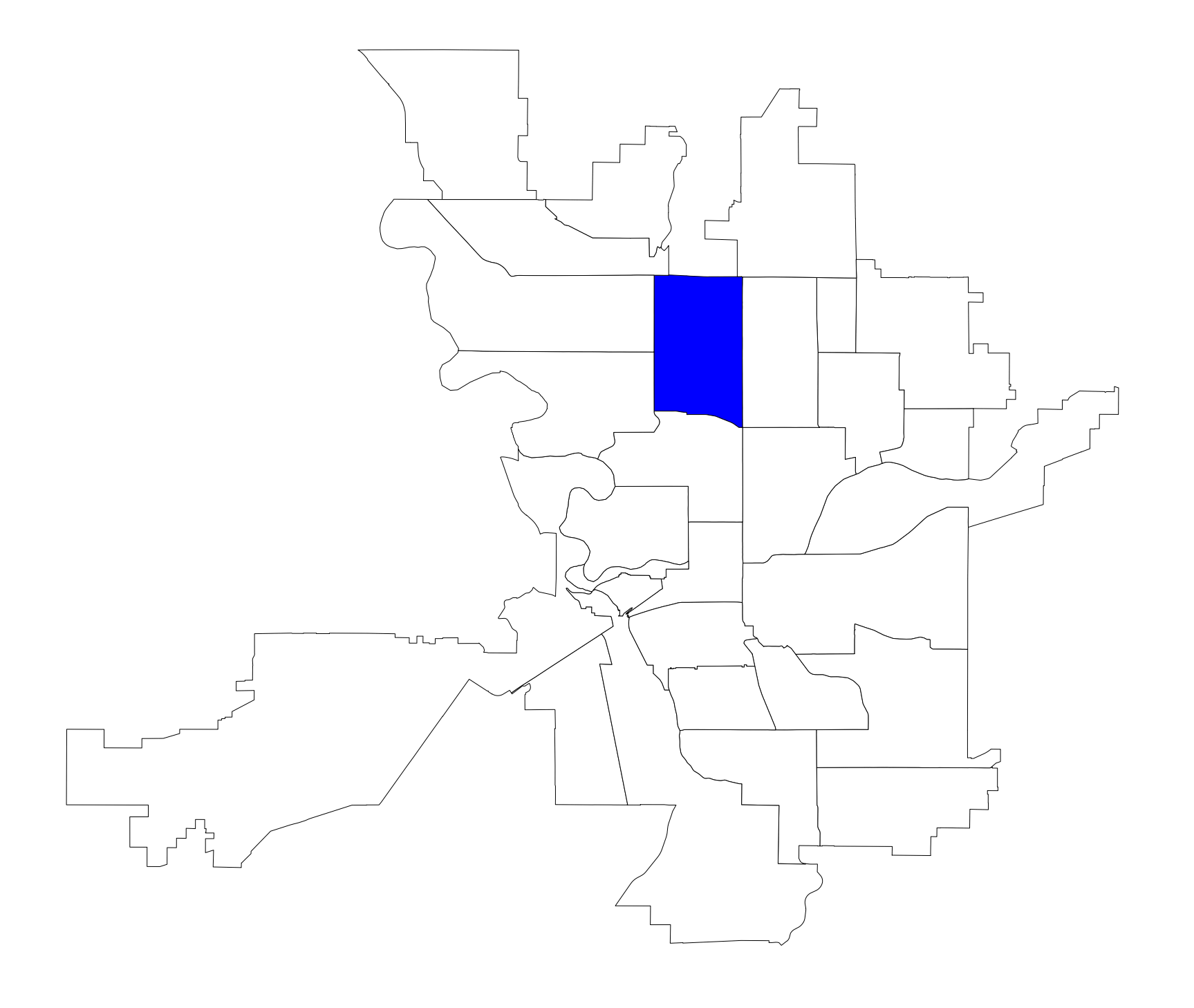
- Location within the city of Spokane
- Coordinates: 47°42′02.5″N 117°25′33.3″W
- Country: United States
- State: Washington
- County: Spokane
- City: Spokane

Population (2017)
  - Total: 12,320

Demographics 2017
  - White: 88.3%
  - Latinx: 5.4%
  - Asian: 2.1%
  - American Indian: 1.9%
  - Black: 1.9%
- Time zone: UTC-8 (PST)
  - Summer (DST): UTC-7 (PDT)
- ZIP Codes: 99205, 99207
- Area code: 509

North Hill is a neighborhood in Spokane, Washington. As the name suggests, it is atop a hill on the north side of Spokane, within which it is centrally located and crossed by numerous major thoroughfares. It is home to parks, commercial districts and single family residential areas. The historic Garland Theater is located in North Hill, and the city's main north–south arterial, Division Street, is home to a major commercial district along the eastern edge of the neighborhood.

== Geography ==
=== Location ===
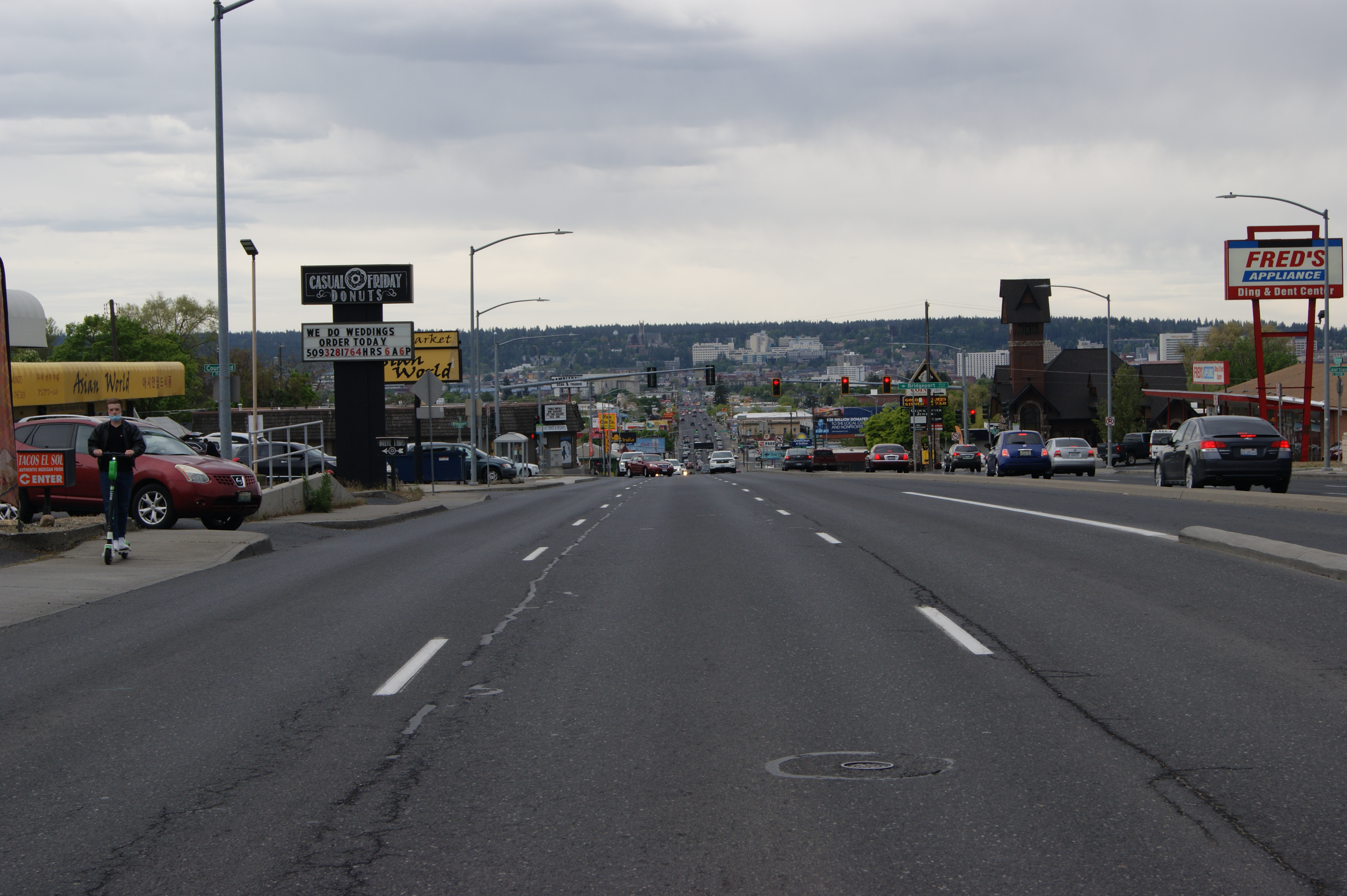
The hill of North Hill looking south along Division Street; North Hill neighborhood is on the right

North Hill is centrally located in the northern half of Spokane. Its southern edge is located a mile and a half north of Downtown, and the northern border is two miles north of that. The northwestern corner of the neighborhood, at Francis Avenue and Maple/Ash Streets, is adjacent to an area known as Five Mile for being located five miles from Downtown.

Courtland and Cora Avenues along the bluff mark the southern border, Division Street is the eastern border, Francis Ave. marks the northern border and Ash St. is the western border. The streets delineating the eastern and western borders carry major north–south thoroughfares that connect downtown in the south with the northern side of the city. Francis Ave. in the north and Wellesley Avenue through the middle are major east–west thoroughfares that connect across the northern side of the city.

The neighborhoods adjacent to North Hill are Emerson/Garfield to the south, Audubon/Downriver and Northwest to the west, Balboa/South Indian Trail and Town and Country to the north, Nevada Heights to the east, and in the southeast corner Logan lies diagonally across the intersection of Division St. and Euclid Avenue.

=== Topography ===
North Hill itself is a ridge running roughly west–east across the southern rim of the neighborhood. It rises 80–100 feet above the neighborhood below over the span of roughly one city block. Beyond that, however, the neighborhood does not have hill-like qualities and is quite flat. The land rises gradually to the north, though is far less steep than the bluff and rises less than 80 feet over the 26 blocks stretching northward. Underlying the North Hill neighborhood is the Spokane Valley-Rathdrum Prairie Aquifer.

== History ==
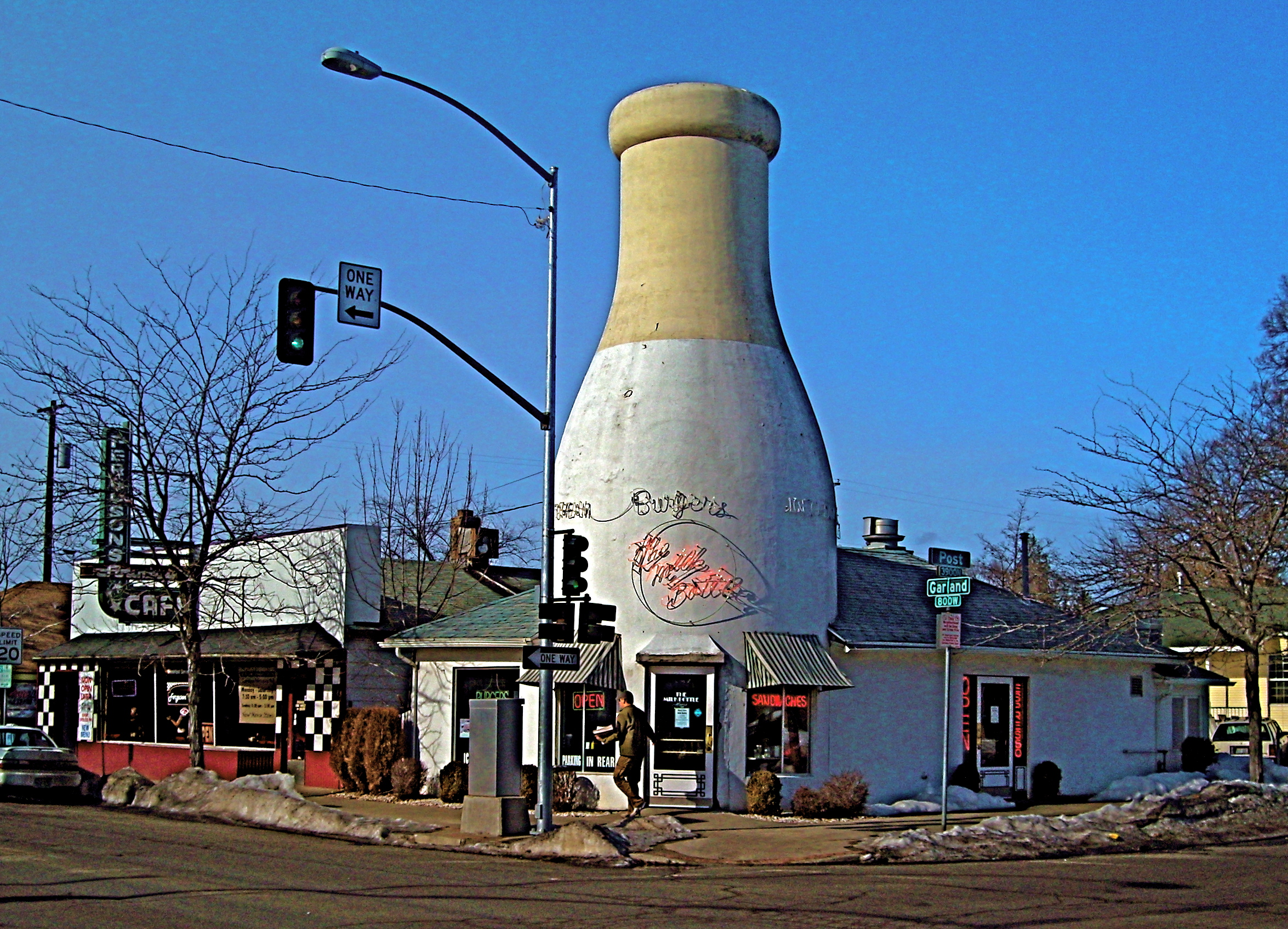
The Garland Benewah Milk Bottle and Ferguson's Cafe

The area south of Garland Avenue was annexed into the city of Spokane in 1891, and the area to the north in 1907. At that time, it was nothing more than a rural area in ponderosa pine forest. Streetcars arrived in 1910 along the Post Street line as well as along Howard and Madison Streets and facilitated growth. Franklin Park, the largest park in the neighborhood, was graded and trees were planted between 1910 and 1912.

By the 1920s, the Garland District began to take shape. It grew into the neighborhood's main center and remains to this day and important and historic commercial district in Spokane. In 1921 the Masonic Temple was built at Garland Ave. and Wall Street. The Benewah Milk Bottle building at Garland and Post was built in 1935. In 1945 the Garland Theater opened at Garland and Monroe. All buildings remain to this day.

== Education ==
North Hill is located within District No. 81 (Spokane Public Schools). It is home to three elementary schools and served by four, and part of four middle school districts and two high school districts.

Madison Elementary is located in the northeast of the neighborhood and serves that area from Division in the east, Francis in the north, Monroe on the west and Wellesley on the south. Ridgeview Elementary is in the northwest and serves that area west of Monroe between Francis and Wellesley. Willard is located in the southern half of the neighborhood and serves it between Wellesley on the north and the bluff on the south. A sliver of the neighborhood at the foot of North Hill is part of the Garfield district. Madison feeds into Salk Middle School, Ridgeview feeds into Pauline Flett Middle School, Willard feeds into Glover Middle School, and Garfield feeds into Denny Yashuhara Middle School. Salk and Flett Middle Schools feed into Shadle Park High School, which is located across the street from North Hill at Ash and Longfellow, while Glover and Yasuhara Middle Schools feed into North Central High School.

== Transportation ==
=== Highway ===
- - U.S. 2 - to Newport (north) and Spokane (south)

U.S. 2 passes north–south as the eastern boundary of North Hill along Division Street.

- - U.S. 395 - to Colville (north) and Spokane (south)

U.S. 395 passes north–south as the eastern boundary of North Hill along Division Street.

- - State Route 291 - to Tumtum (north) and Spokane (south)

State Route 291 passes east–west as the northern boundary of North Hill along Francis Avenue and has its southern terminus in the neighborhood at Francis and Division Street.

=== Surface Streets ===
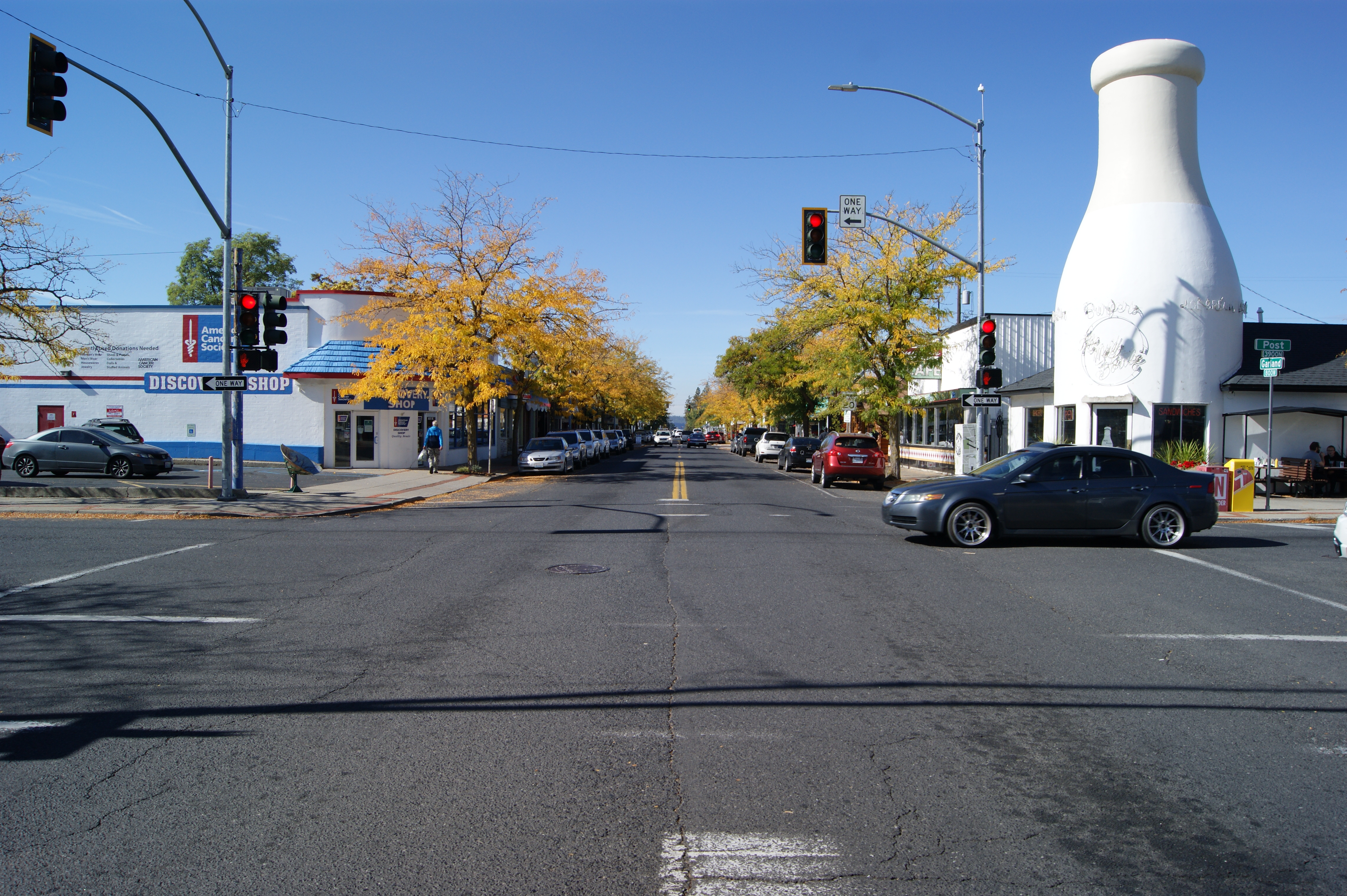
The historic Garland District on Garland Avenue

North Hill is well integrated into the city's street grid, and almost all of the neighborhood is laid out according to it. Only in the far south along the ridge, where the terrain interrupts the grid, does it significantly break from the street grid. Here, east to west, only Division, Post, Monroe, Courtland, Maple and Ash climb the bluff into North Hill from Emerson/Garfield.

Division, Monroe and the Maple/Ash couplet are classified as principal arterials by the city. They are significant north–south thoroughfares that connect downtown with points north including and beyond North Hill. Francis and Wellesley are also classified as principal arterials. They are significant east–west thoroughfares that connect the western and eastern areas of the north side of Spokane through North Hill. Additionally, Main Street is classified as a minor arterial going north–south, and Garland and Rowan Avenues are classified as minor arterials going east–west.

Bicycles are prohibited on Division through North Hill, and the only dedicated bike lane in the neighborhood is located on Rowan. Shared roadway bike routes run along Cora and Courtland east of Cedar, and up Cedar north to Garland, as well as along Wall north of Garland, Rowan east of Monroe and Central west of Wall.

=== Public Transit ===
The Spokane Transit Authority, the region's public transportation provider, serves North Hill with six fixed schedule bus lines.

Route	Termini			Service operation and notes	Streets traveled
4; Monroe	Downtown Spokane; STA Plaza	↔	Balboa/South Indian Trail; Five Mile Park and Ride	High-frequency route	Monroe Street
25; Division	Downtown Spokane; STA Plaza	↔	Fairwood; Hastings Park and Ride	High-frequency route	Division Street
33; Wellesley	Spokane Community College; SCC Transit Center	↔	Spokane Falls Community College; Spokane Falls Station	High-frequency route	Wellesley Avenue
23; Maple/Ash	Downtown Spokane; STA Plaza	↔	North Indian Trail	Basic-frequency route	Maple/Ash Street couplet
27; Hillyard	Downtown Spokane; STA Plaza	↔	Balboa/South Indian Trail; Five Mile Park & Ride	Basic Frequency Route	Francis Avenue
124; North Express	Downtown Spokane; STA Plaza	↔	Fairwood; Hastings Park and Ride	Express route during peak weekday hours	Monroe

== Demographics ==
As of 2017 the population of North Hill was 12,320 people in 5,261 households, 28.1% of which were households with children. The median household income was $44,925, compared to $44,768 citywide. 19.2% of the population had a bachelor's degree or above and 30.9% had only a high school diploma. People aged 19 and under made up 25.5% of the population and people aged 65 and older made up 12.8% of the population. Persons of color made up 5.5% of the population, compared to 15.1% citywide. 36.9% of households were rentals, compared to 45.4% citywide. Unemployment was at 7.9%, compared to 6.5% citywide. 56.7% of children qualified for free or reduced school lunch, compared to 54.5% citywide. 94.9% of residents were born in the United States or its territories. Of those who weren't, 33.6% were from Ukraine, 18.1% from the United Kingdom and 12.5% from the Philippines.
