= Garland Theater =

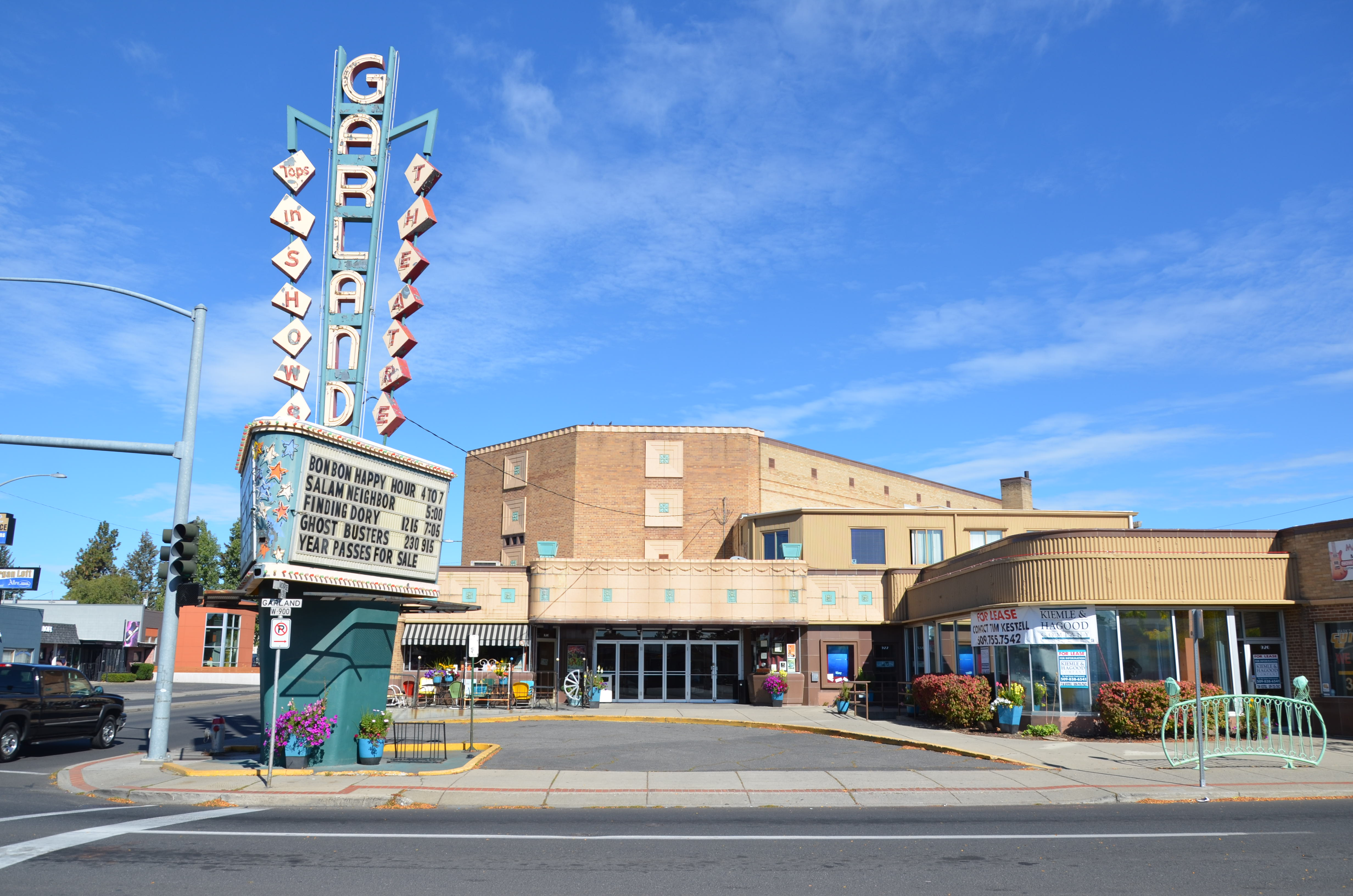
- Interactive map of Garland Theater
- Address: 924 W. Garland Ave; Spokane, Washington; U.S.
- Coordinates: 47°41′37″N 117°25′32″W
- Owner: Jordan Tampien
- Capacity: 630
- Type: Movie theater
- Screen: 1
- Public transit: Spokane Transit Authority

Construction
- Built: 1945
- Opened: November 22, 1945; 80 years ago
- Renovated: 2015 (interior)
- Architects: Albert Harvey Funk, Bjarne H. Moe
- Builders: Funk, Molander & Johnson

Tenants
- Bon Bon, Kiss and Makeup, and Marks Guitar Shop

Website
- garlandtheater.org
- Garland Theater
- U.S. National Register of Historic Places
- Aerial view of the Garland Theater and surrounding environment in 2023
- Built: 1945
- Architectural style: Streamline Moderne
- MPS: Movie Theaters in Washington State MPS
- NRHP reference No.: 13000999
- Added to NRHP: December 24, 2013

The Garland Theater is an independent movie theater in Spokane, Washington. Located in the Garland District, in the North Hill neighborhood, it was added to the National Register of Historic Places in 2013.

The Theater opened on November 22, 1945, almost three months after the end of World War II showing It's a Pleasure and Double Exposure. The Garland became a discount theater in 1988. The Garland Theater was seen as one of the west's premier theaters when it was built, and has become seen as a classic and modern movie theater in the years since.

== History ==
Built in 1945 in the Streamline Moderne style, the Garland Theater was built in a single-screen style with one main theater.

In 2013, renovation work was done on the Garland Theater worth more than $350,000. New seats and a new projector were key parts of the updates. The capacity was reduced to meet ADA requirements. The updates also allowed for an interior connection between the bar and the theater itself, both of which are housed within the same building.

In 2023, the theater was sold by previous owner, Katherine Fritchie, to real estate developer Jordan Tampien.

== Description ==
The Garland Theater is a single-screen movie house that was built in a single-story apartment style in a reinforced concrete exterior and a terra cotta, brick, and tile exterior.
