= Balboa/South Indian Trail, Spokane =

Balboa/South Indian Trail
- Neighborhood
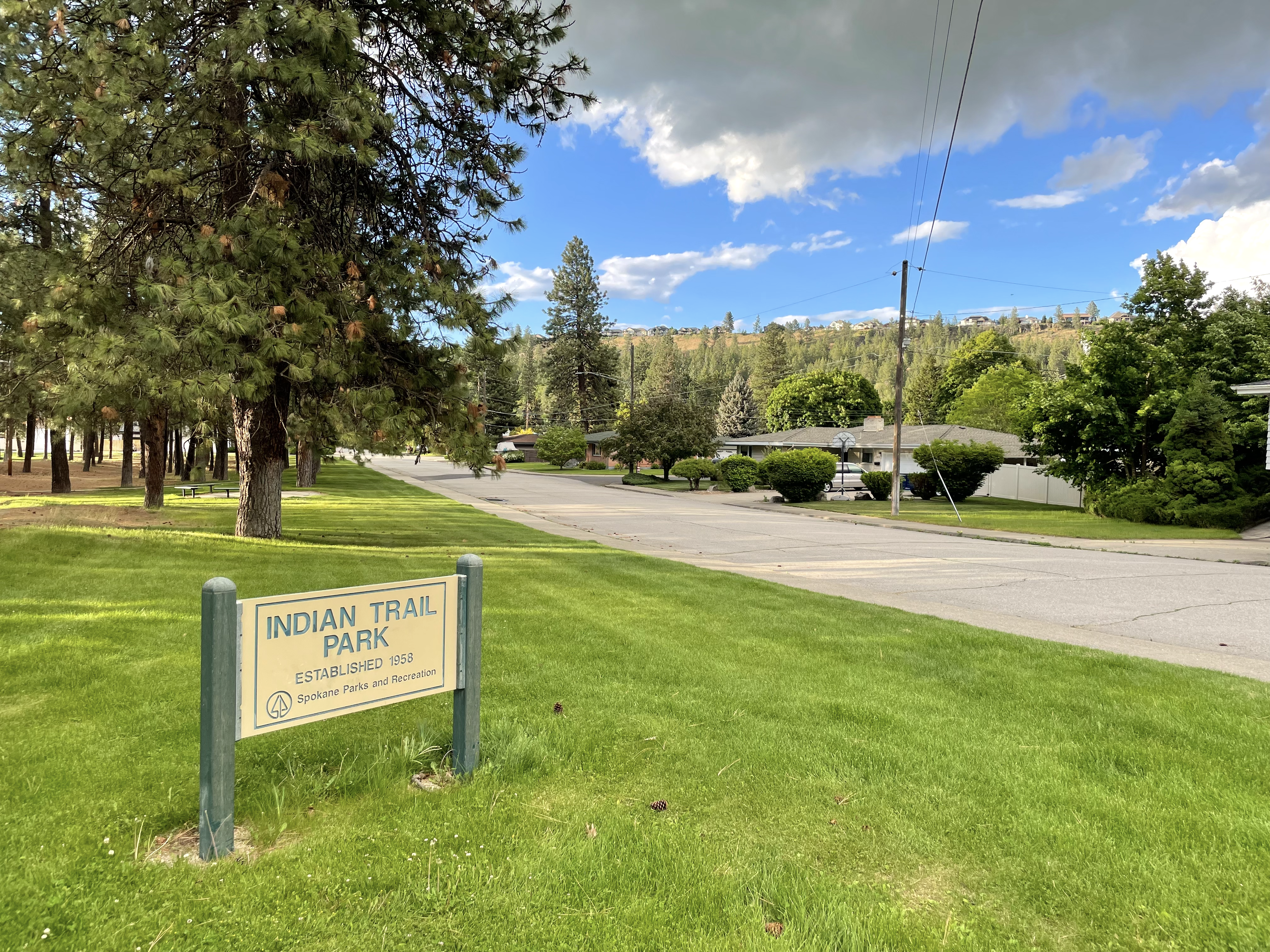
- Indian Trail Park in South Indian Trail

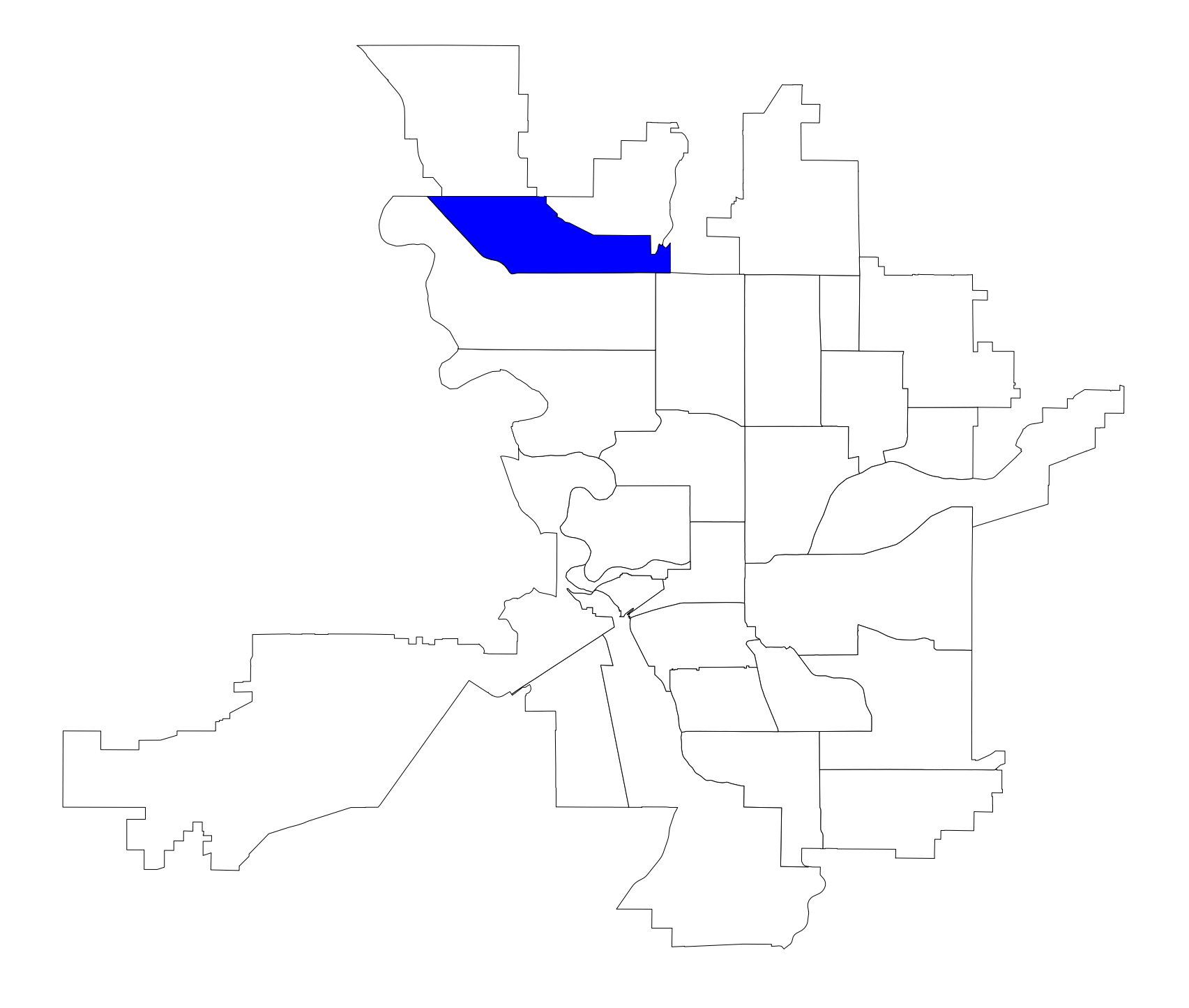
- Location within the city of Spokane
- Coordinates: 47°43′15.6″N 117°28′12.1″W
- Country: United States
- State: Washington
- County: Spokane
- City: Spokane

Population (2017)
  - Total: 5,645

Demographics 2017
  - White: 90.2%
  - Latinx: 4.8%
  - Asian: 2%
  - Black or African American: 1.6%
  - American Indian/Alaska Native: 1%
- Time zone: UTC-8 (PST)
  - Summer (DST): UTC-7 (PDT)
- ZIP Codes: 99205, 99208
- Area code: 509

Balboa/South Indian Trail is a neighborhood in Spokane, Washington located on the northwestern side of the city. The neighborhood is largely composed of single-family residential areas that were developed after being annexed into the city in the 1950s. The neighborhood is situated on tableland above a steep bluff rising from the Spokane River to the west, that then rises up a more developed bluff towards Five Mile Prairie which is located above the neighborhood to the north and east.

== History ==
The Spokane people have lived in what is now Balboa/South Indian Trail for hundreds of years. The neighborhood's name comes from the presence of a centuries-old trail through the area.

With the arrival of European settlers in the 1800s, the trail became an important arterial for the trappers and pioneers who came to the Spokane area. The trail was renamed Pioneer Road and was part of a route that connected the Columbia River to Spokane House, roughly 7.5 miles to the northwest of the current neighborhood. From Spokane House, the trail and subsequent Pioneer Road passed through the area to the city of Spokane. In 1883, Scotch-Irishman settler Robert McKinley acquired 640 acres of land in the area upon which he built a camp that provided drinking water to pioneers traversing the road. Most of Balboa/South Indian Trail is located on the land formerly owned by McKinley.

For the first half of the 20th century, the neighborhood remained outside of the city limits and largely rural. Things began to change when the city annexed the majority of the neighborhood in 1956, and the northernmost areas along with the North Indian Trail a decade later in 1966. Residential development quickly followed the 1956 annexation with what was known as the Pacific Heights addition. Balboa Elementary, named for Vasco Núñez de Balboa, the first European to have seen the Pacific Ocean, was opened in 1960. The pace of development necessitated the construction of a two more schools in the neighborhood within just four years. Salk Middle School, named for Jonas Salk, was built in 1961 and Indian Trail Elementary in 1964.

Five Mile Shopping Center on the eastern edge of the neighborhood was first built in 1955 with a Rosauers Supermarket as its anchor. The store remains in the location as of 2022, though it was temporarily closed in 2008 after a record month of snowfall in the city caused a massive roof collapse. Over the years the shopping center expanded westward as other retail stores, services and restaurants were added.

A positive environmental development took place in Balboa/South Indian Trail in 2021. Established in 1931, the Northside Landfill was an open dump that served as the city's primary waste disposal location. By 1962 it was being converted into a covered landfill. In the 1980s, numerous toxic chemicals were found to be leeching into the groundwater from the landfill, and the dump was closed to the public. In 1989 the Environmental Protection Agency issued its cleanup plan for the site and it was added to the EPA's Superfund program. After the cleanup goals were completed, chemical concentrations in the groundwater had returned to within state and federal standards by 2020. In 2021, the site was officially removed from the Superfund program. The landfill is still considered to be active, but is no longer open to the public.

== Geography ==
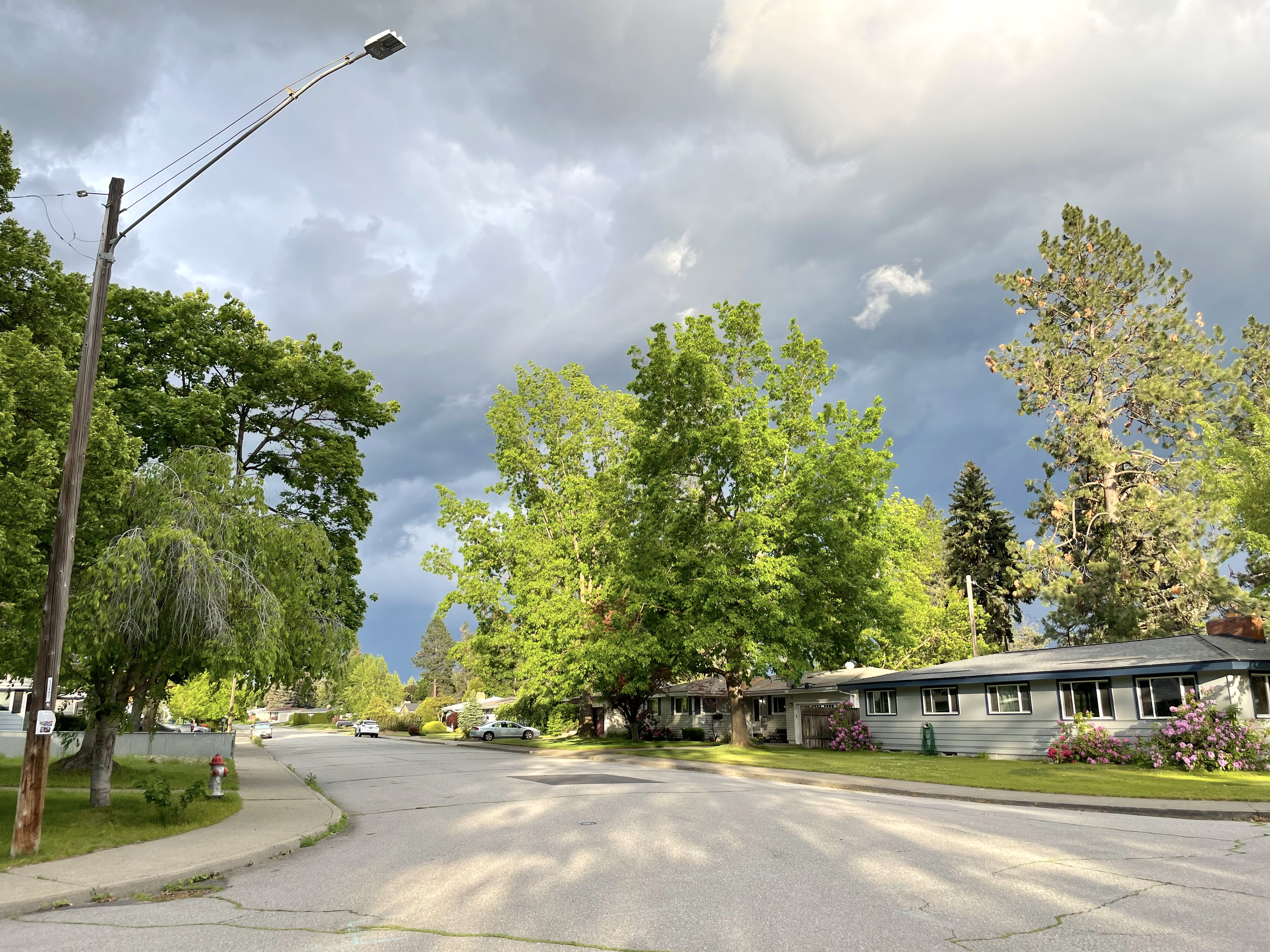
Typical street scene in Balboa/South Indian Trail

Balboa/South Indian Trail is built mostly upon gently sloping land, but two steep bluffs pass along the edges of the neighborhood. The western bluff descends steeply towards the Spokane River, falling more than 200 feet over a distance of roughly 1,000 feet across. The eastern bluff, which rises to the Five Mile Prairie above, is more suitable for development, though it is also quite steep in other places.

The neighborhood extends from Cedar Street on the east, which separates it from Town and Country, to Nine Mile Road in the west, across which lies unincorporated Spokane County. Francis Avenue is the southern boundary, across which lies the Northwest neighborhood, with the crest of the Five Mile Bluff as the boundary in the north. Nine Mile Road and Francis Avenue carry Washington State Route 291 through the neighborhood. The easternmost section of the neighborhood is known locally as "Five Mile" and is home to the Five Mile Shopping Center, a major retail district for the northwest side of Spokane. The "Five Mile" moniker is also shared with the Five Mile Prairie neighborhood immediately to the north of Balboa/South Indian Trail and Five Mile Road, which starts at the shopping center and climbs up the bluff to the prairie. It comes from its location roughly five miles north of Downtown Spokane.

Almost all of the neighborhood is zoned for single-family housing, though not all of the land is developed as such. The bluff on the west is largely undeveloped and consists of parkland in the south and a landfill in the north. The easternmost portion of the neighborhood is zoned for commercial and consists of the Five Mile Shopping Center. A neighborhood retail zone is located near the center of the neighborhood on Indian Trail Road just north of Francis Avenue. Indian Trail Park, next to Indian Trail Elementary, as well as the campuses of Balboa Elementary and Salk Middle School provide public open spaces within the neighborhood.

== Demographics ==
As of 2017, there were 5,645 residents in the neighborhood across 2,243 households, of which 27.1% had children. 13.8% of households were rented, compared to 45.3% citywide. 22.5% of the residents were aged 19 or younger, compared to 21.9% citywide. Those over 65 made up 25.6% of the population, compared to 14.5% citywide. The median household income was $68,985, compared to $44,768 citywide. 33% of the population has a bachelor's degree or higher while 23.5% have at most a high school diploma. The unemployment rate was 3.7% compared to 6.5% citywide. 49.5% of students qualify for free or reduced lunch, compared to 54.5% citywide. 94.6% of residents were born in the United States or one of its territories. Of those born elsewhere, 30.5% were from Canada, 17.9% from the Philippines, 7.3% from France and 4.7% from the China.

== Education ==
Balboa/South Indian Trail is served by Spokane Public Schools. Balboa Elementary is located in the eastern half of the neighborhood and serves the residents east Indian Trail Road. Indian Trail Elementary is located in the west and serves the area west of Indian Trail Road. Bemiss feeds into Salk Middle School, which is also located in the east of the neighborhood. Indian Trail is set to feed into the Pauline Flett Middle School in the adjacent Northwest neighborhood when it opens in 2022. Both Salk and Flett feed into Shadle Park High School, also located in the Northwest neighborhood.

== Transportation ==
=== Highway ===
- - State Route 291 - to Tumtum (north) and Spokane (south)

=== Surface Streets ===
State Route 291 travels through Balboa/South Indian Trail along Francis Avenue and Nine Mile Road, which are surface streets and not limited-access highways, though State Route 291 does become limited-access just after leaving the neighborhood to the north. Nine Mile Road, Francis Avenue, Indian Trail Road and the Maple/Ash couplet are classified as principal arterials by the city, the highest classification for a surface street. Five Mile Road is classified as a secondary arterial. The rest of the streets are local access streets.

Five Mile Road has a dedicated bike lane. Belt Road is a shared roadway bicycle route.

=== Public Transit ===
Balboa/South Indian Trail is served by the Spokane Transit Authority like the rest of the Spokane metropolitan area, with four fixed-route bus lines passing through the neighborhood.

Route	Termini			Service operation and notes	Streets traveled
4; Five Mile	Downtown Spokane; STA Plaza	↔	Balboa/South Indian Trail; Five Mile Park & Ride	High-frequency route	Maple/Ash couplet
22; Northwest Boulevard	Downtown Spokane; STA Plaza	↔	Balboa/South Indian Trail; Five Mile Park & Ride	Basic-frequency route	Francis Avenue, Maple/Ash couplet
23; Maple/Ash	Downtown Spokane; STA Plaza	↔	North Indian Trail; Meadowglen Park	Basic-frequency route	Francis Avenue, Indian Trail Road
27; Hillyard	Downtown Spokane; STA Plaza	↔	Balboa/South Indian Trail; Five Mile Park & Ride	Basic-frequency route; Downtown Spokane via Hillyard	Maple/Ash couplet
