= Suncrest, Washington =

Unincorporated community in Washington, United States

- Unincorporated community
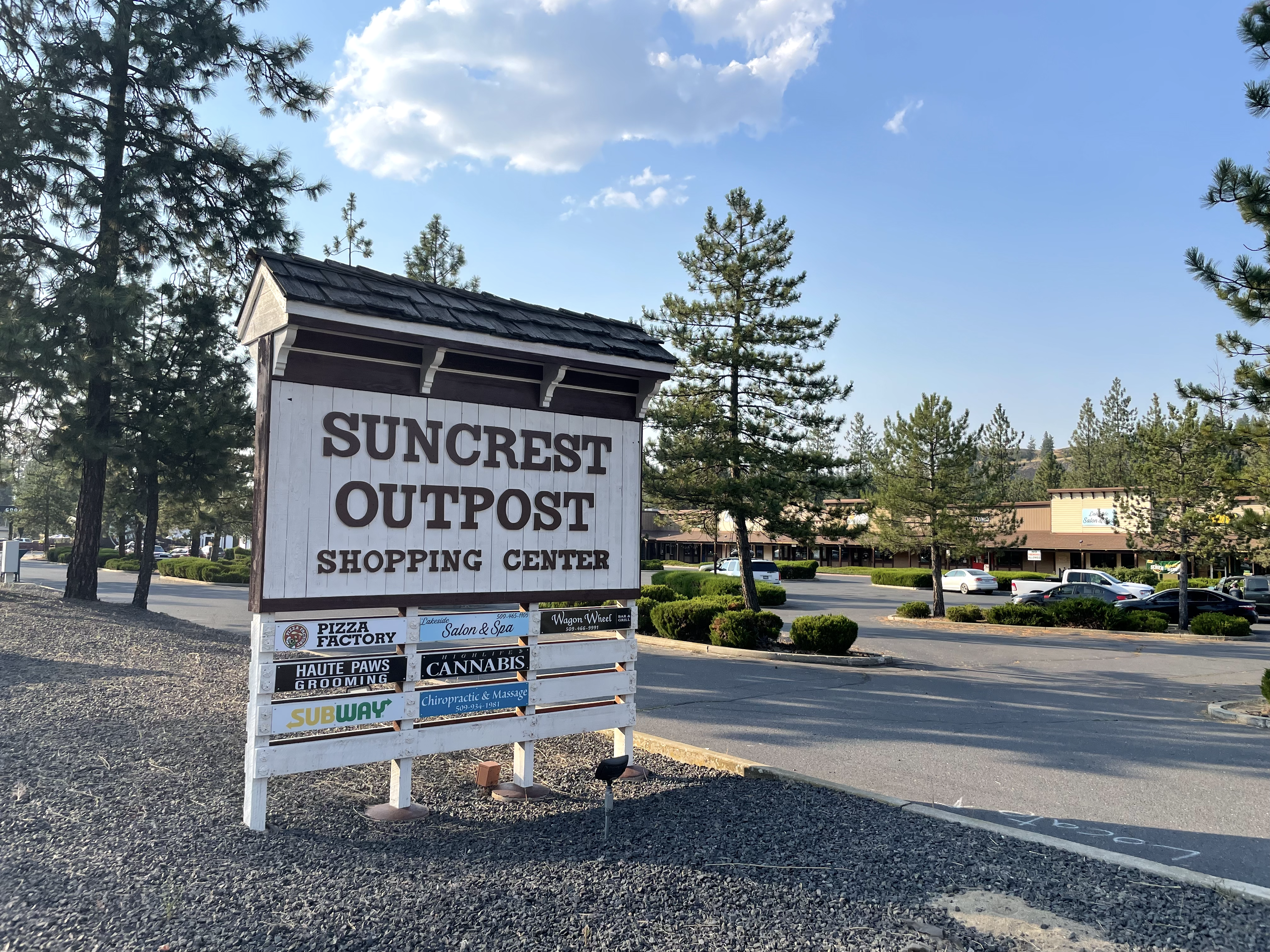
- Shopping center on WA-291 in Suncrest

- Location within Washington (state)
- Coordinates: 47°48′53″N 117°34′36″W
- Country: United States
- State: Washington
- County: Stevens

Area
  - Total: 9.86 sq mi (25.5 km^{2})
- Elevation: 1,847 ft (563 m)

Population (2020)
  - Total: 5,413
- Time zone: UTC-8 (Pacific (PST))
  - Summer (DST): UTC-7 (PDT)
- ZIP code: 99026
- Area code: 509
- GNIS feature ID: 2807191

Suncrest is a census-designated place (CDP) in Stevens County, Washington, United States. Though it is not incorporated as a city or town, the CDP's population of 5,413 at the 2020 census makes Suncrest the largest community in the county. The community is located along the Spokane River 9.7 miles northwest of the city of Spokane, of which it is a exurb and bedroom community. The community experienced substantial growth starting in the mid-1980s, with gated community and suburban style development. State Route 291 is the main thoroughfare through Suncrest, as well as its main connection to the surrounding area including Spokane.

== History ==
The Spokane people inhabited the area for thousands of years prior to European settlement. The river supported salmon runs that provided bountiful food for the area's inhabitants, though the runs were killed off when Long Lake Dam was built in 1915 without a fish ladder.

White settlers have had a permanent presence in the area since the early 1800s. In 1810, the North West Company established Spokane House at the confluence of the Spokane and Little Spokane River, just over a mile upstream from present day Suncrest. It was the first permanent white settlement in what would become the state of Washington.

Contemporary Suncrest came to be in the mid-1960s when development began on the residential community in the area. Development boomed starting in the 1980s, with more than 1,000 homes constructed over the ten years leading up to 1996. By that time, Suncrest's population had surpassed 5,000 residents, making the community larger than Colville, the county seat. This rapid growth put a strain on both Suncrest and nearby Spokane's transportation infrastructure, namely SR-291. With limited services and employment opportunities, residents of Suncrest had little choice but to commute into Spokane for work and much of their shopping needs. Suncrest's location in Stevens County and dependence on Spokane County complicated attempts to improve the situation. “Their lifestyle in Suncrest is subsidized by the residents of Spokane," Spokane Planning Director Charlie Dotson told The Spokesman-Review in 1996. By that time, the Suncrest community had become effectively a bedroom community of Spokane. Development continued into the 2000s, with increased focus on non-residential development to serve the community, including retail and commercial businesses, as well as a $1 million dollar medical facility project in 2007.

== Geography ==
Suncrest is located in the extreme southeast corner of Stevens County. The Spokane River to the immediate south of Suncrest marks the border between Stevens and Spokane Counties to the south, and the county line between the two runs north–south less than a mile to the east of Suncrest. The closest community is Nine Mile Falls, approximately 2.5 miles as the crow flies and 4.5 miles by road along State Route 291 to the southeast. The Spokane city limits are approximately 9.7 miles by road southeast of Suncrest along SR-291.

The Spokane River, known as Long Lake in this area as it is a reservoir impounded by Long Lake Dam, flows in a northwesterly direction past Suncrest along the community's southeast. An area of relatively flat tableland approximately 3.5 miles long and 1 mile wide stretching from Sandy Canyon in the south to Little Sandy Canyon in the north contains the bulk of the developed area of Suncrest. The flat is an approximate elevation of 1800 feet, but falls nearly 300 feet down a steep bluff to the river on one side and is flanked by rugged terrain that rises hundreds of feet in elevation on the other side. The peak of Lookout Mountain, just two miles to Suncrest's east, is at an elevation above 3,100 feet. SR-291 runs along the edge of the flat opposite the river, and as a result almost all of the community lies between SR-291 and the river, though most of the retail areas are located on the other side of SR-291.

Houses are located along the northern shore of Long Lake, 9.7 miles northwest of Spokane and about 5 miles northwest of central Nine Mile Falls, the next nearest population center. The main road through Suncrest is State Highway 291.

== Demographics ==
Historical population
Census	Pop.	Note	%±
2020	5,413		—
U.S. Decennial Census

Suncrest first appeared as a census designated place in the 2020 U.S. census.

=== Racial and ethnic composition ===
Suncrest CDP, Washington – Racial and ethnic composition Note: the US Census treats Hispanic/Latino as an ethnic category. This table excludes Latinos from the racial categories and assigns them to a separate category. Hispanics/Latinos may be of any race.
Race / Ethnicity (NH = Non-Hispanic)	Pop 2020	2020
White alone (NH)	4,689	86.62%
Black or African American alone (NH)	21	0.39%
Native American or Alaska Native alone (NH)	69	1.27%
Asian alone (NH)	52	0.96%
Native Hawaiian or Pacific Islander alone (NH)	25	0.46%
Other race alone (NH)	35	0.65%
Mixed race or Multiracial (NH)	314	5.80%
Hispanic or Latino (any race)	208	3.84%
Total	5,413	100.00%

=== 2020 census ===
As of the 2020 Census, the Suncrest CDP had a population of 5,413 residents across 1,922 households. Estimates by the Census Bureau as of July 1, 2021 show that 94.6% of the population is white alone, 0.0% Black alone, 1.2% American Indian or Alaska Native alone, 1.0% Asian alone, 0.0% Native Hawaiian or Pacific Islander alone, 3.2% two or more races and 6.2% Hispanic or Latino.

== Community ==
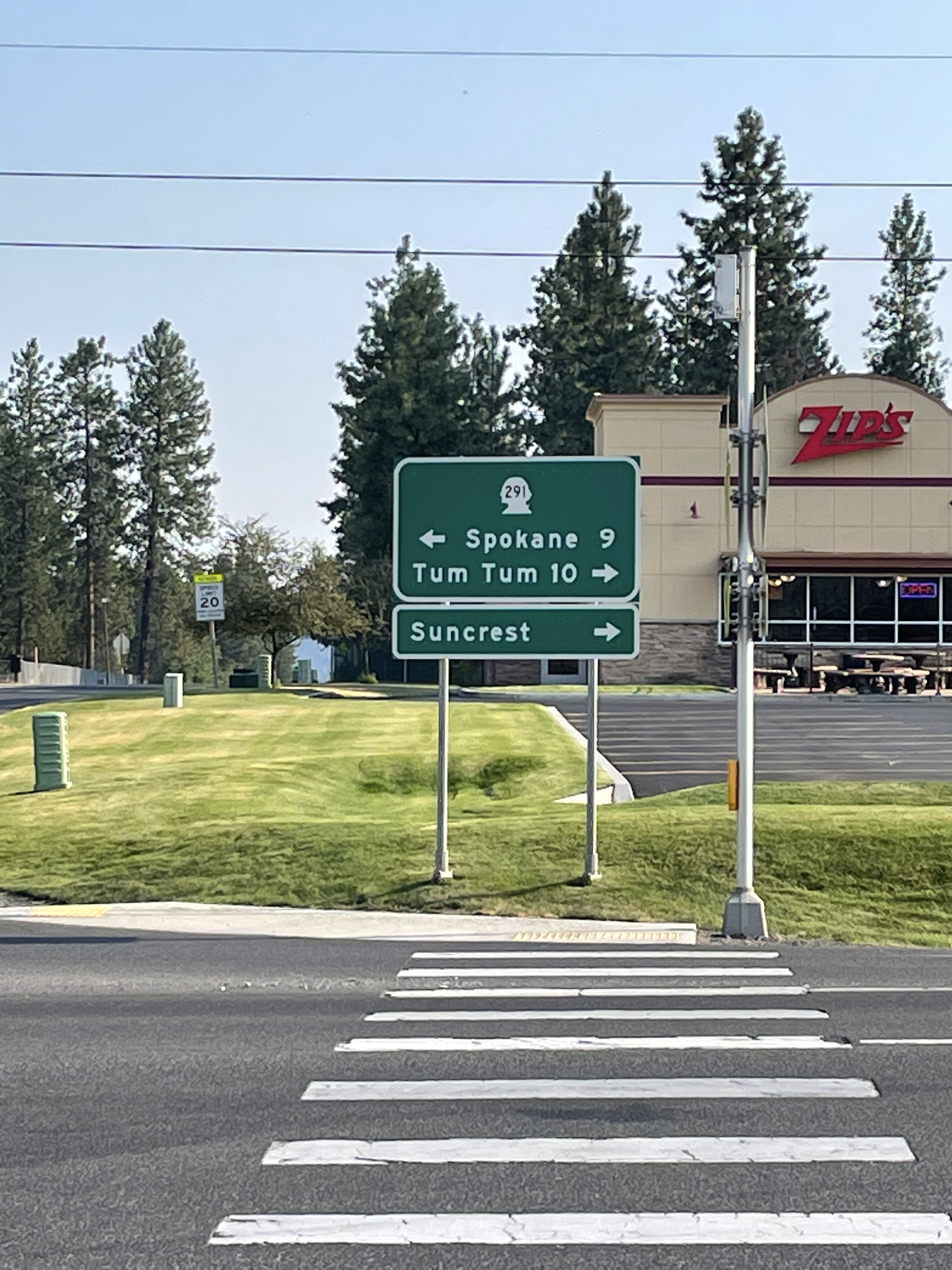
Crosswalk at SR-291 and Swenson Road

=== Public services ===
Suncrest is served by the Nine Mile Falls School District, with three public schools located in the community:

- Lake Spokane Elementary
- Lakeside Middle School
- Lakeside High School

The Stevens County Fire District has also centered a fire/EMS station in the community. This is the location of the district's quarterly blood drives.

The Stevens County Rural Library District has been a part of Suncrest since 1996. The Lakeside branch, located in Suncrest, is one of the District's larger branches. Services of SCRLD include books, movies, CDs and tapes, free Internet access, printing and copying, etc. As such, the library provides a vital resource for a wide range of users, including farmers, loggers, homeschool parents and distance education students, who view the library as "their community hub, their reference source, their connection to the Internet, their bus stop, their office, their living room even."

=== Commerce ===
Suncrest is a commercial center for nearby rural residents. The community includes the Suncrest Shopping Center, Suncrest Outpost and a medical and dental center. Growth has been very rapid during the years of 2009-2010, with over 20 new businesses opened in the community during that period. Rosauers Supermarkets opened a grocery store in the community in December 2014.

=== Recreation ===
This area is popular with equestrians, with many back trails for horses and bicycles. In addition, the proximity of the community to Lake Spokane also called Long Lake, makes it a popular for various types of water sports, including boating and fishing. Some planned developments in the area offer residents free membership in one of the community's private recreational clubs.
