= Nine Mile Falls School District =

School district in Washington, United States

Address
- 10110 W Charles Road Nine Mile Falls, Washington, 99026; United States
- Coordinates: 47°46′48″N 117°33′06″W

District information
- Grades: K—12
- Superintendent: Jeffrey Baerwald
- NCES District ID: 5305640
- Affiliation(s): Washington State Office of Superintendent of Public Instruction, U.S. Department of Education

Students and staff
- Enrollment: 1,448 (2021)
- Student–teacher ratio: 16.69 (2021)

Other information
- Website: 9mile.org

Nine Mile Falls School District No. 325/179 is a public school district in the counties of Spokane and Stevens, Washington, USA and serves the communities of Nine Mile Falls and Suncrest.

== Schools ==
=== High schools ===
- Lakeside High School

=== Middle schools ===
- Lakeside Middle School

=== Primary schools ===
- Lake Spokane Elementary School
- Nine Mile Falls Elementary School
