= North Indian Trail, Spokane =

North Indian Trail
- Spokane neighborhood
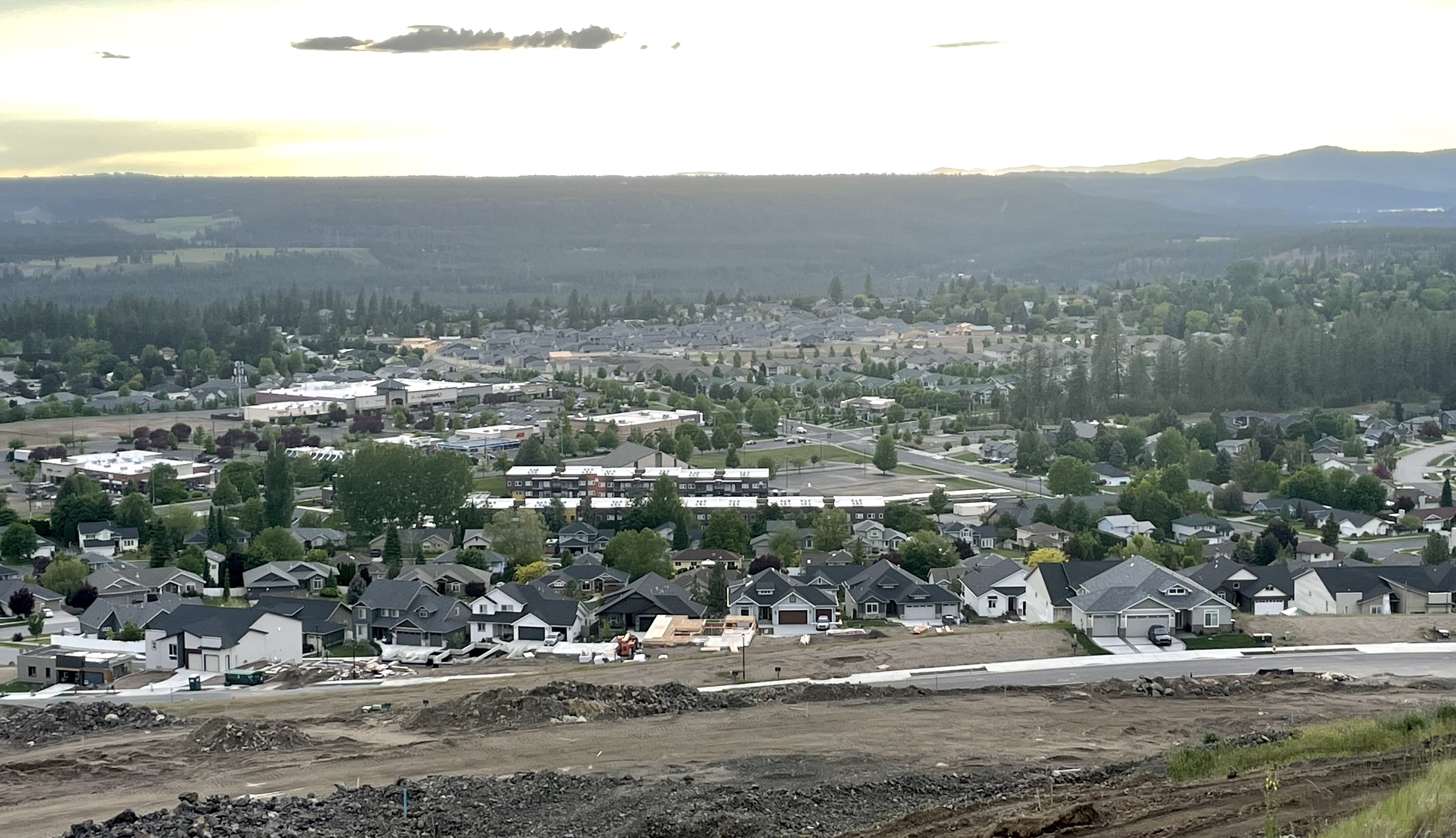
- North Indian Trail from above on Five Mile Prairie

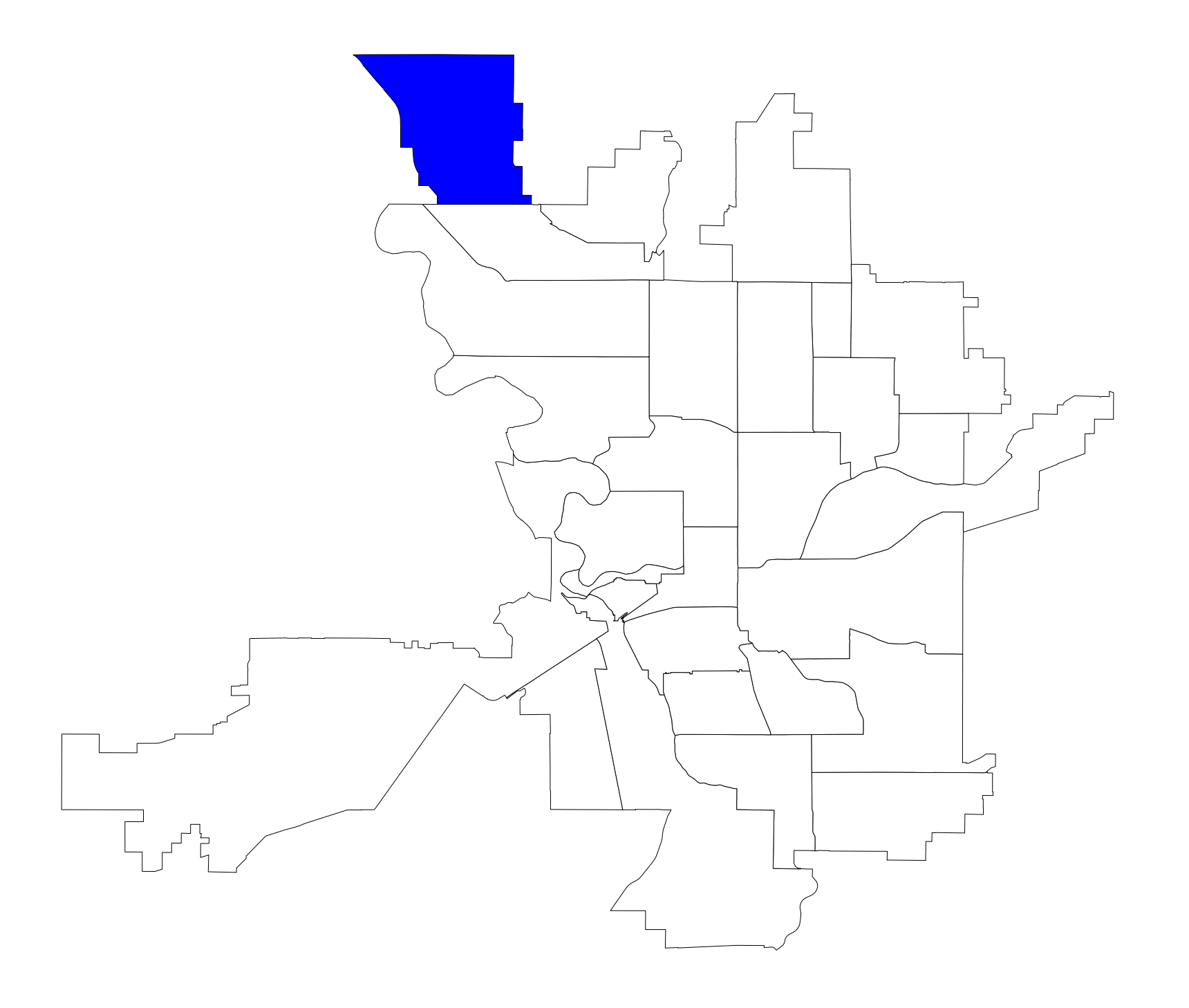
- Location within the city of Spokane
- Coordinates: 47°44′41.5″N 117°29′19.7″W
- Country: United States
- State: Washington
- County: Spokane
- City: Spokane

Population (2017)
  - Total: 7,577

Demographics 2017
  - White: 91.4%
  - Latinx: 4.5%
  - Asian: 2.9%
  - Black or African American: 1%
  - American Indian/Alaska Native: 0.9%
- Time zone: UTC-8 (PST)
  - Summer (DST): UTC-7 (PDT)
- Zip codes: 99208
- Area code: 509

North Indian Trail is a neighborhood in the northwesternmost corner of Spokane, Washington. It extends to the northwest of the rest of Spokane along a tableland east of the Spokane River, west of the Five Mile Prairie. Its terrain isolates the neighborhood somewhat, and it was only extensively developed starting in the second half of the 20th century.

== History ==
The Spokane people have lived in what is now North Indian Trail for hundreds of years. The neighborhood's name comes from the presence of a centuries-old trail through the area.

With the arrival of European settlers in the 1800s, the trail became an important arterial for the trappers and pioneers who came to the Spokane area. The trail was renamed Pioneer Road and was part of a route that connected the Columbia River to Spokane House, just a couple of miles to the northwest of the current neighborhood. From Spokane House, the trail and subsequent Pioneer Road passed through the area to the city of Spokane.

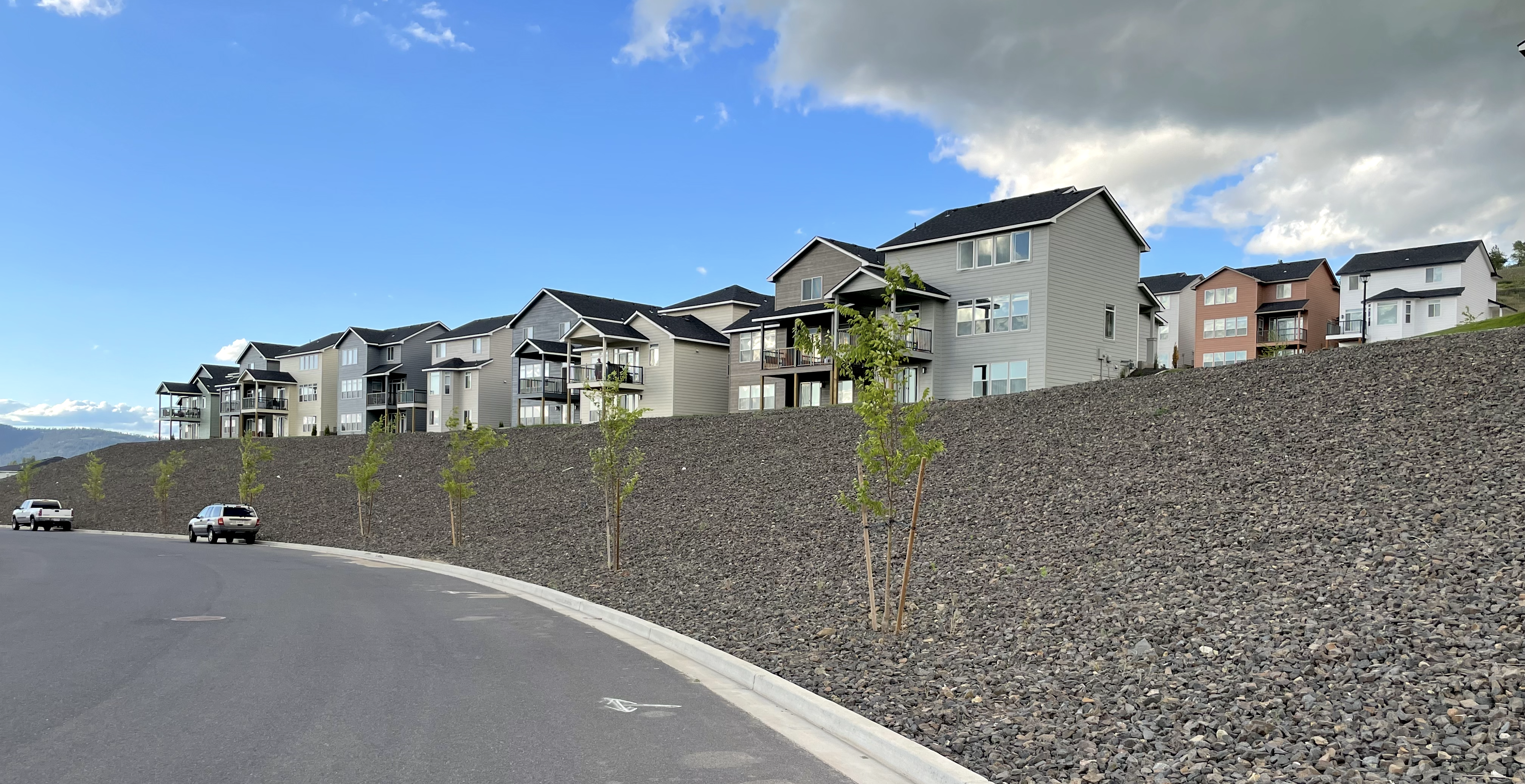
New construction from 2021 in North Indian Trail

North Indian Trail remained rural in nature through the middle of the 20th century. In 1956, areas north of Francis Avenue in northeast Spokane were annexed into the city. Though this annexation did not extend into the present boundaries of North Indian Trail, it began the steady creep of development towards the neighborhood. The South Indian Trail area, along the former Pioneer Road that had been renamed Indian Trail Road, saw development move northward throughout the 1950s and 1960s. In 1966, the North Indian Trail neighborhood was annexed into the city as well, and development began to transform the neighborhood from rural to suburban in the 1970s. This growth necessitated the construction of a school to serve the neighborhood, Woodridge Elementary, in 1981. Development continued into the 21st century, with the construction of a shopping center in the heart of the neighborhood in 2002.

As of 2020, development of the neighborhood remains ongoing, with construction projects adding more housing to the area in the few patches of undeveloped land left.

== Geography ==
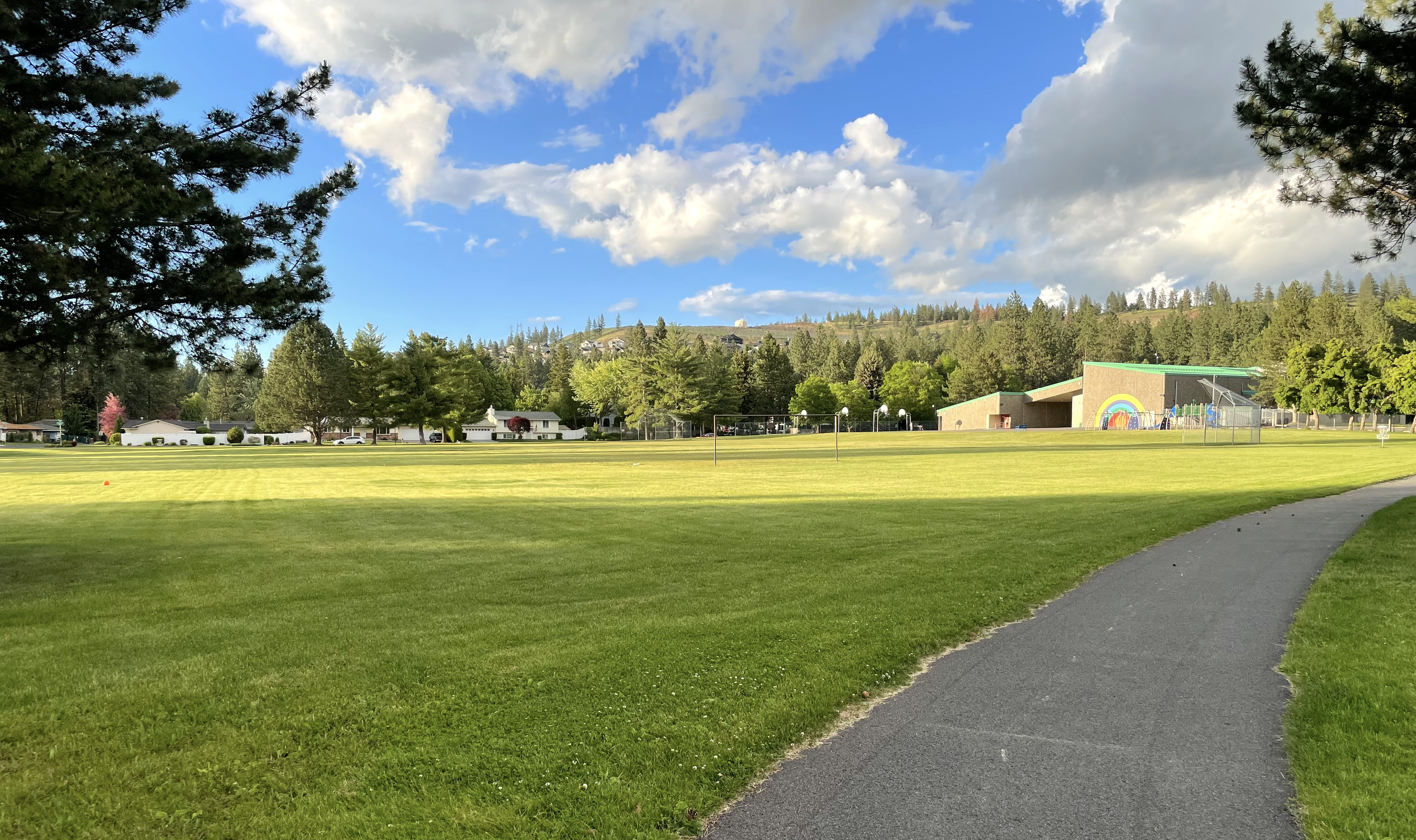
Woodridge Elementary with the Five Mile Bluff in the background

North Indian Trail is built upon a tableland above the Spokane River in Northwest Spokane. It lies at roughly 2,000 feet but rises quickly to the east to 2,300 feet and above on the Five Mile Prairie. The steep bluff between the two serves as the rough boundary on the east. There is also a steep bluff in the west, running through the middle of the neighborhood as the tableland drops down to the elevation of the Spokane River, which lies roughly 400 feet below. Just beyond the bluff to the west runs State Route 291, which serves as the neighborhood, and city, limits.

A largely flat stretch of land containing much of the developed area of the neighborhood, stretching south-east to north-west, lies between the two bluffs. The western bluff is too steep for development, but the less steep areas on the eastern bluff have been developed into residential housing.

== Demographics ==
As of 2017, the population of North Indian Trail was 7,577 people across 2,808 households. Of those, 19% were rented, compared to 45.3% citywide. 29.6% of households had children, and 25% of the residents were aged 19 or younger, compared to 21.9% citywide. Those over 65 made up 16% of the population, compared to 14.5% citywide. The median household income was $88,901, compared to $44,768 citywide. 42% of the population has a bachelor's degree or higher while 14.8% have at most a high school diploma. The unemployment rate is 2.5% compared to 6.5% citywide. 44.9% of students qualify for free or reduced lunch, compared to 54.5% citywide. 89.5% of residents were born in the United States or one of its territories. Of those born elsewhere, 25.8% were from China, 12.2% from Russia, 7.7% from Canada and 7% from the United Kingdom.

== Transportation ==
=== Highway ===
- – State Route 291 – to Tumtum (north) and Spokane (south)

=== Surface streets ===
North Indian Trail does not conform to the city's street grid. Instead, it has a suburban character dominated by cul-de-sacs connected by winding roads.

Due in part to the terrain, its location in a far corner of the city, and pattern of development, North Indian Trail is not well-connected to the rest of the city. Indian Trail Road is the only street that connects directly to another part of the city. Until 2017, when Barnes Road was built up the bluff to the east, it was the only road in and out of the neighborhood in any direction. Even with the second connection to the neighborhood along Barnes Road, traffic congestion remains a major issue in North Indian Trail. A 2018 apartment project was scrapped due to traffic concerns.

Indian Trail Road, south of Shawnee Avenue, is considered a principal arterial by the city. Barnes Road is classified as a major collector and Shawnee Avenue as a minor collector. Route 291 is not a surface street and is considered as a freeway or an expressway.

Indian Trail Road continues for about a mile north of the neighborhood to an intersection with Rutter Parkway in unincorporated Spokane County. Via Rutter Parkway, the neighborhood is connected to the community of Nine Mile Falls and Washington State Route 291 in the west and Fairwood in the east.

=== Public transit ===
North Indian Trail is served by the Spokane Transit Authority like the rest of the Spokane metropolitan area.

Route	Termini			Service operation and notes	Streets traveled
23; Maple/Ash	Downtown Spokane; STA Plaza	↔	North Indian Trail; Meadowglen Park	Basic-frequency route	Indian Trail Road

== Education ==
North Indian Trail is served by Spokane Public Schools. Woodridge Elementary is located in the neighborhood and serves the residents north of Barnes Road west of Indian Trail Road and north of Strong Road to the east. Balboa Elementary in the adjacent Balboa/South Indian Trail neighborhood serves the southern portion of North Indian Trail. Both feed into Salk Middle School, which is also located in the adjacent Balboa/South Indian Trail neighborhood. From there, North Indian Trail feeds into Shadle Park High School in the Audubon/Downriver neighborhood.
