= Washington State Route 291 =

State highway in Washington, United States

State Route 291

Route information
- Auxiliary route of US 395
- Maintained by WSDOT
- Length: 33.09 mi (53.25 km)
- Existed: 1964–present

Major junctions
- South end: US 2 / US 395 in Spokane
- North end: SR 231 near Ford

Location
- Country: United States
- State: Washington
- Counties: Spokane, Stevens

Highway system
- State highways in Washington; Interstate; US; State; Scenic; Pre-1964; 1964 renumbering; Former
← SR 290	→ SR 292

State Route 291 (SR 291) is a state highway in Eastern Washington in the United States. It travels east–west along the north side of the Spokane River between Spokane and the Long Lake Dam; despite its east–west route, SR 291 is signed as a north–south route. The highway serves several recreational areas and the communities of Suncrest and Tumtum; its southern terminus is at U.S. Route 2 (US 2) and US 395 in northern Spokane, while its northern terminus is at SR 231.

== Route description ==
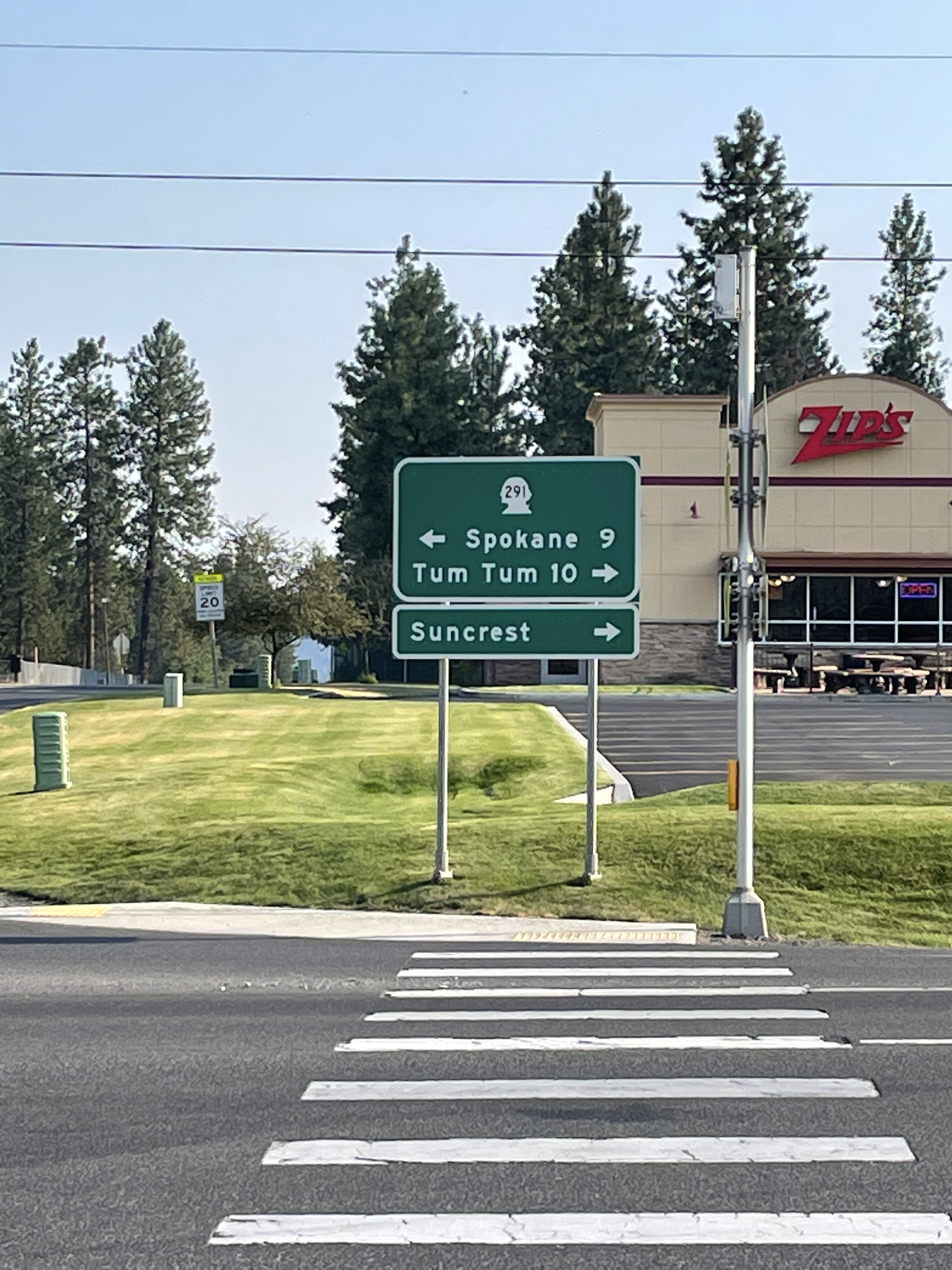
Route sign and pedestrian crosswalk at Swenson Road in Suncrest

SR 291 begins at an intersection with US 2 / US 395, named North Division Street, and West Francis Avenue in the Town and Country and North Hill neighborhoods of Spokane. The highway travels west along West Francis Avenue through western Spokane, before turning northwest along North Nine Mile Road in the Balboa/South Indian Trail neighborhood. The highway begins to parallel the Spokane River as it passes a golf course and then through the community of Nine Mile Falls. The highway continues northwest, entering Stevens County from Spokane County, just east of the Nine Mile Falls Dam, as it crosses the Little Spokane River. It then climbs and shifts further north of the river to accommodate a housing development at Suncrest. Entering the community of Tumtum the highway turns southwest, snaking around Long Lake before turning west and terminating at SR 231.

Every year the Washington State Department of Transportation (WSDOT) conducts a series of surveys on its highways in the state to measure traffic volume. This is expressed in terms of annual average daily traffic (AADT), which is a measure of traffic volume for any average day of the year. In 2009, WSDOT calculated that as few as 360 cars traveled through the intersection with Corkscrew Canyon Road near the northern terminus, and as many as 30,000 cars passed through the intersection with Ash Street in downtown Spokane.

== History ==
Before the 1964 state highway renumbering, the portion of SR 291 between Spokane and the Stevens County line was designated Secondary State Highway 3S. An extension following the Spokane River from SR 231 west to SR 25 on the Columbia River was proposed in the late 1960s. A study by the Washington State Department of Highways was completed in 1968 and determined that it would cost $15 million and would be "difficult to justify" due to its low traffic.

The Spokane–Nine Mile Falls section of SR 291 was widened and modernized in 1970 by the state government, which included the realignment of an intersection with North Assembly Street.

== Major intersections ==
County	Location	mi	km	Destinations	Notes
Spokane	Spokane	0.00	0.00	US 2 / US 395 (North Division Street) to I-90	Southern terminus
Stevens		33.09	53.25	SR 231 (Spring Creek Road) – Reardan, Ford, Springdale	Northern terminus
1.000 mi = 1.609 km; 1.000 km = 0.621 mi
