= Nine Mile Falls, Washington =

Unincorporated community in Washington, United States

- Unincorporated community
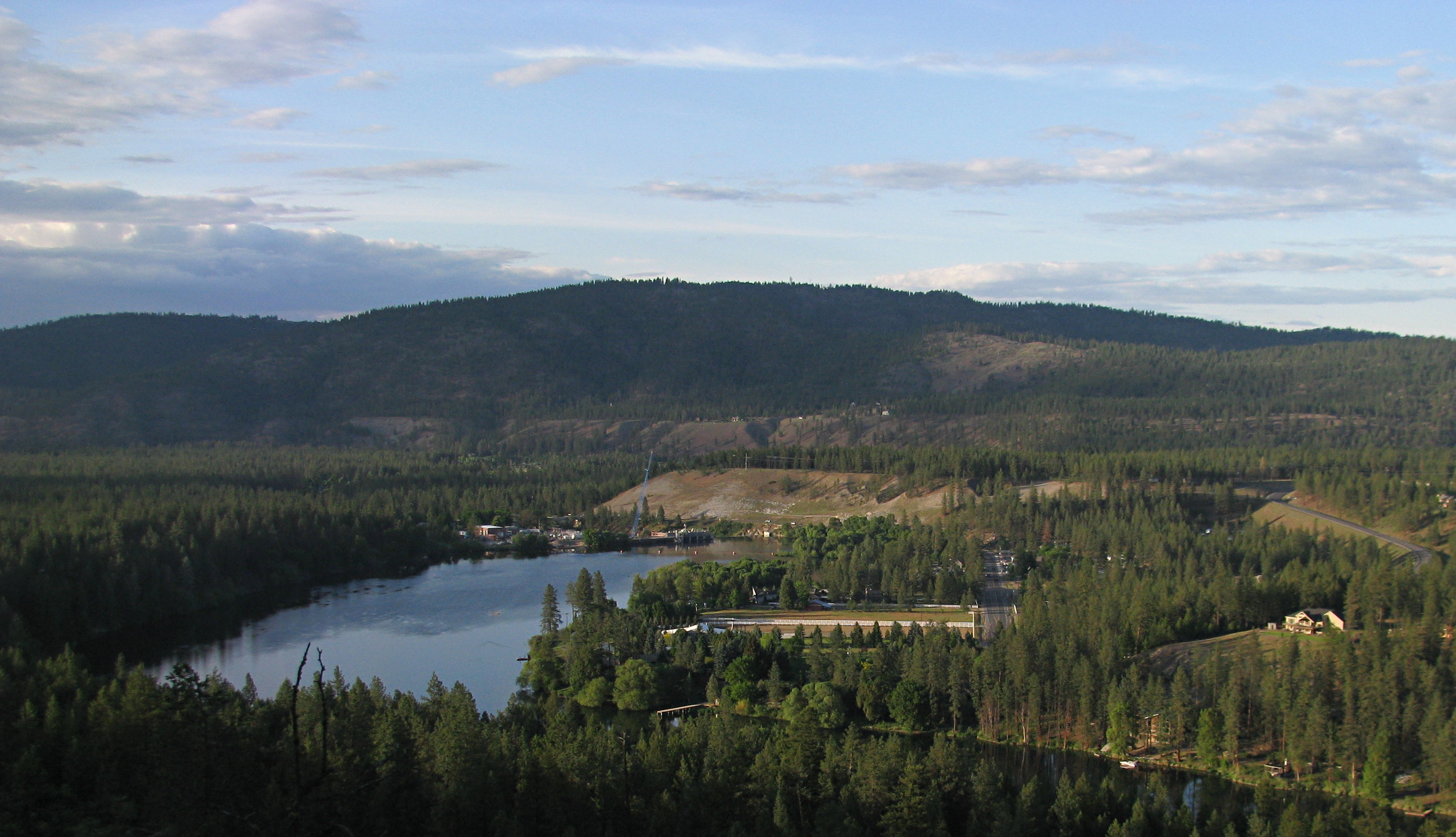
- Nine Mile Dam and part of the community of Nine Mile Falls
- Nickname: Nine Mile
- Coordinates: 47°46′33″N 117°32′46″W
- Country: United States
- State: Washington
- County: Spokane County
- Named for: A former waterfall located nine miles from Downtown Spokane
- Elevation: 1,618 ft (493 m)
- Time zone: UTC−8 (PST)
  - Summer (DST): UTC−7 (PDT)
- Zip Code: 99026
- Area code: 509
- GNIS feature ID: 1511827

Nine Mile Falls is an unincorporated community in Spokane County, Washington and Stevens County, Washington, United States. The community straddles the Spokane River 9 miles (14 km) from downtown Spokane, at the location of a former falls that has been the site of Nine Mile Dam since 1908.

Nine Mile Falls has a post office with ZIP code 99026.

== Geography ==
As the name suggests, the community is located nine miles northwest of Downtown Spokane along the Spokane River. That naming convention can also be seen in the nearby community of Seven Mile and the Spokane neighborhood of Five Mile Prairie. Unlike those two, however, Nine Mile Falls is not part of the contiguous built up urban and suburban area surrounding Spokane. Suburban sprawl comes within two miles of the community, but does not directly abut it, making Nine Mile Falls an exurb of Spokane.

The community is located along Washington State Route 291, known in the area as Nine Mile Road, which follows the route of the river. Traveling from Spokane, visitors first encounter the eastern portion of the community. The western portion of the community across the river is accessed by turning off Nine Mile Road onto Charles Road, which crosses the river a few hundred feet downstream of the dam. The post office and most of the services are located on the eastern side of the community. The west side is home to a park, fire station, restaurant and elementary school. Sontag Park on the west side of the community is the western end of the Spokane River Centennial Trail, which provides access to Riverside State Park which stretches along the river for miles upstream of the community.

The Little Spokane River flows into the Spokane River just north of Nine Mile Falls. From that point and extending downstream the Spokane River serves as the border between Spokane and Stevens Counties. Nine Mile Dam impounds the Nine Mile Reservoir. Long Lake, also known as Lake Spokane, the reservoir behind Long Lake Dam, begins almost immediately downstream from Nine Mile Dam.

Geologically, the community is dominated by the Columbia River Basalt Group, alluvium laid down by glacial outburst Missoula floods, and the erosive action of the Spokane and Little Spokane Rivers. The Spokane River turns from a northwestern direction to a western path just downstream of Nine Mile Falls, as it navigates around the southern foothills of the Selkirk Mountains. The first of those foothills are visible in the photo at the top of the article. The river cut a thin and steep roughly 200-foot-deep valley through the surrounding plateau. Downstream of the site of the falls the valley widens and becomes shallower. Areas that have not been cleared for development or farming are covered in ponderosa pine forest.

Nine Mile Falls is located in the Nine Mile Falls School District. Nine Mile Falls Elementary School is located within the community, but the middle and high schools are located in nearby Suncrest.

== History ==
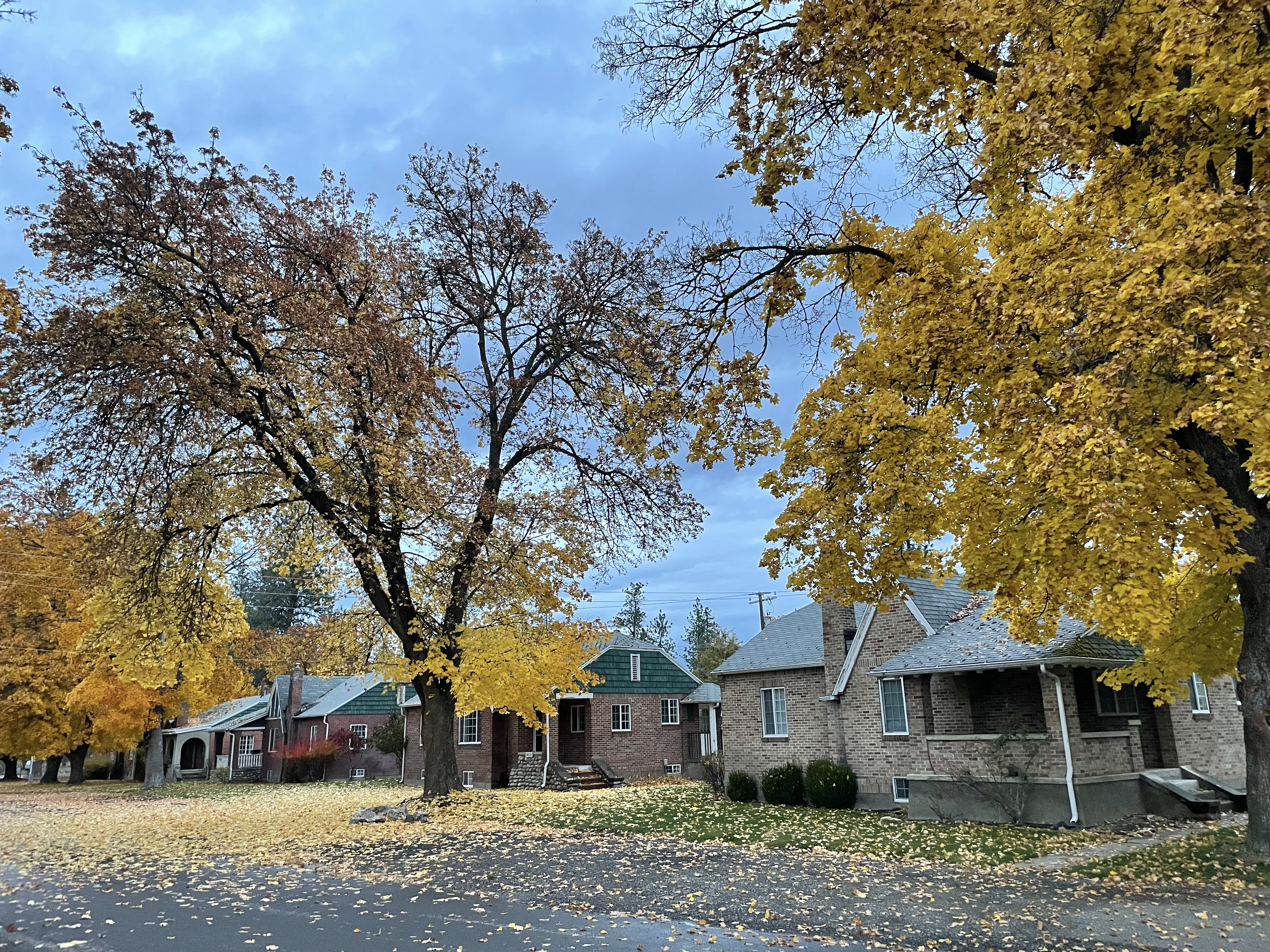
Cottages on the Nine Mile Falls Dam complex in Nine Mile Falls

The Spokane people inhabited the area for thousands of years prior to European settlement. The rivers supported salmon runs that provided bountiful food for the area's inhabitants, though the runs were killed off when Long Lake Dam was built in 1915 without a fish ladder. There are ancient rock paintings located along the Little Spokane River just upstream from its confluence with the Spokane River.

Europeans have had a constant presence in the Nine Mile area since the Spokane House was established at the confluence of the two rivers in 1810.

The community now known as Nine Mile Falls was first developed in 1908 when Spokane industrialist Jay P. Graves built the Nine Mile Dam to provide electricity for his Spokane & Montrose motorized streetcar system. The electricity generated at the dam helped spur the expansion of Spokane's streetcar and interurban railway systems, and in turn helped spur the growth of the greater Spokane area. A village was built at the site of Nine Mile Falls to provide housing for dam workers and their families. The hydro plant and adjoining village were placed on the National Register of Historic Places in 1990. The historic areas of the hydroelectric complex are jointly managed by Avista Utilities, which operates the dam and power generation, and Riverside State Park.

== Gallery ==
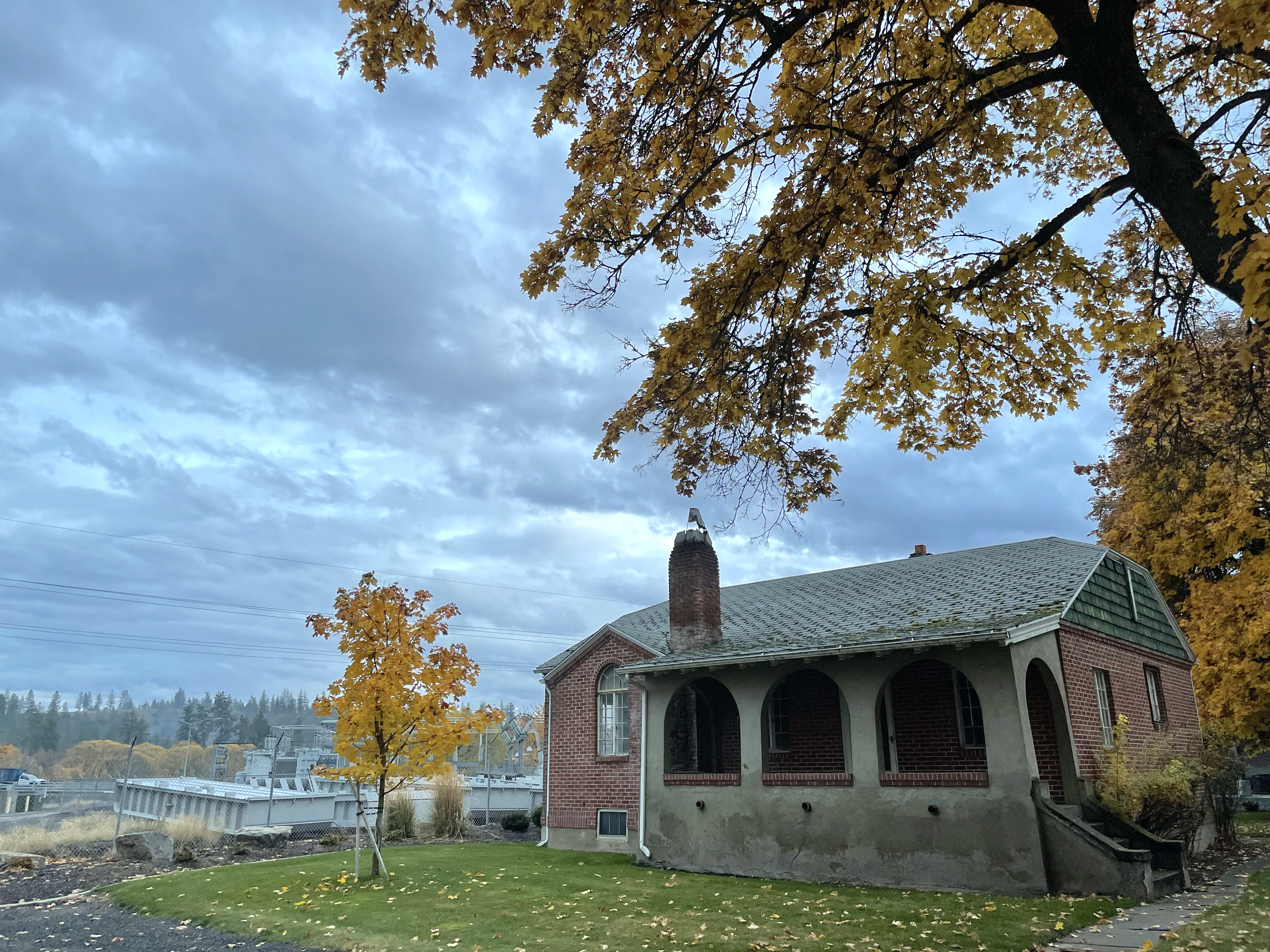
A cottage at the hydroelectric complex with the dam facility visible behind

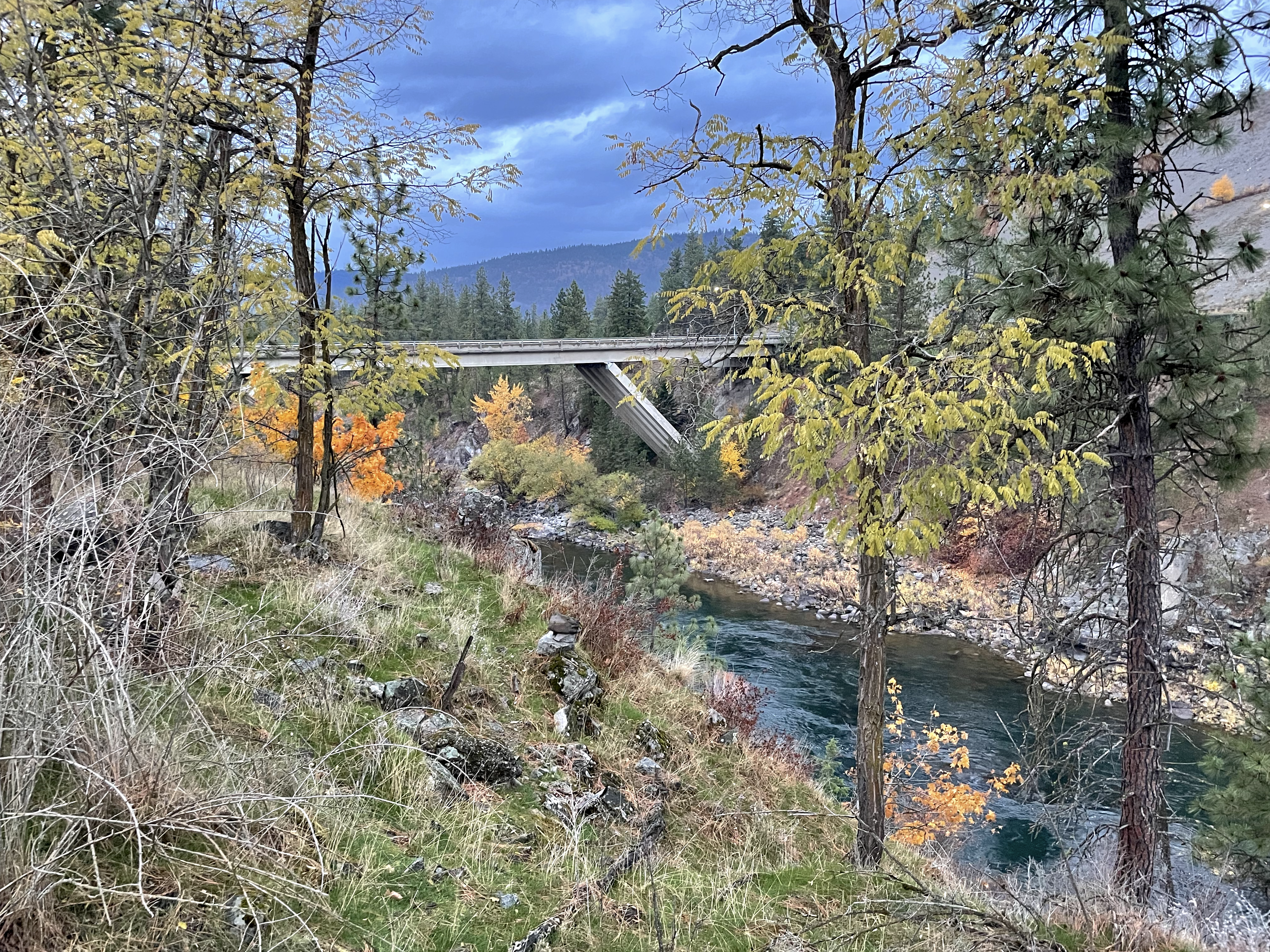
Charles Road crossing the Spokane River and connecting the west and east sides of the community

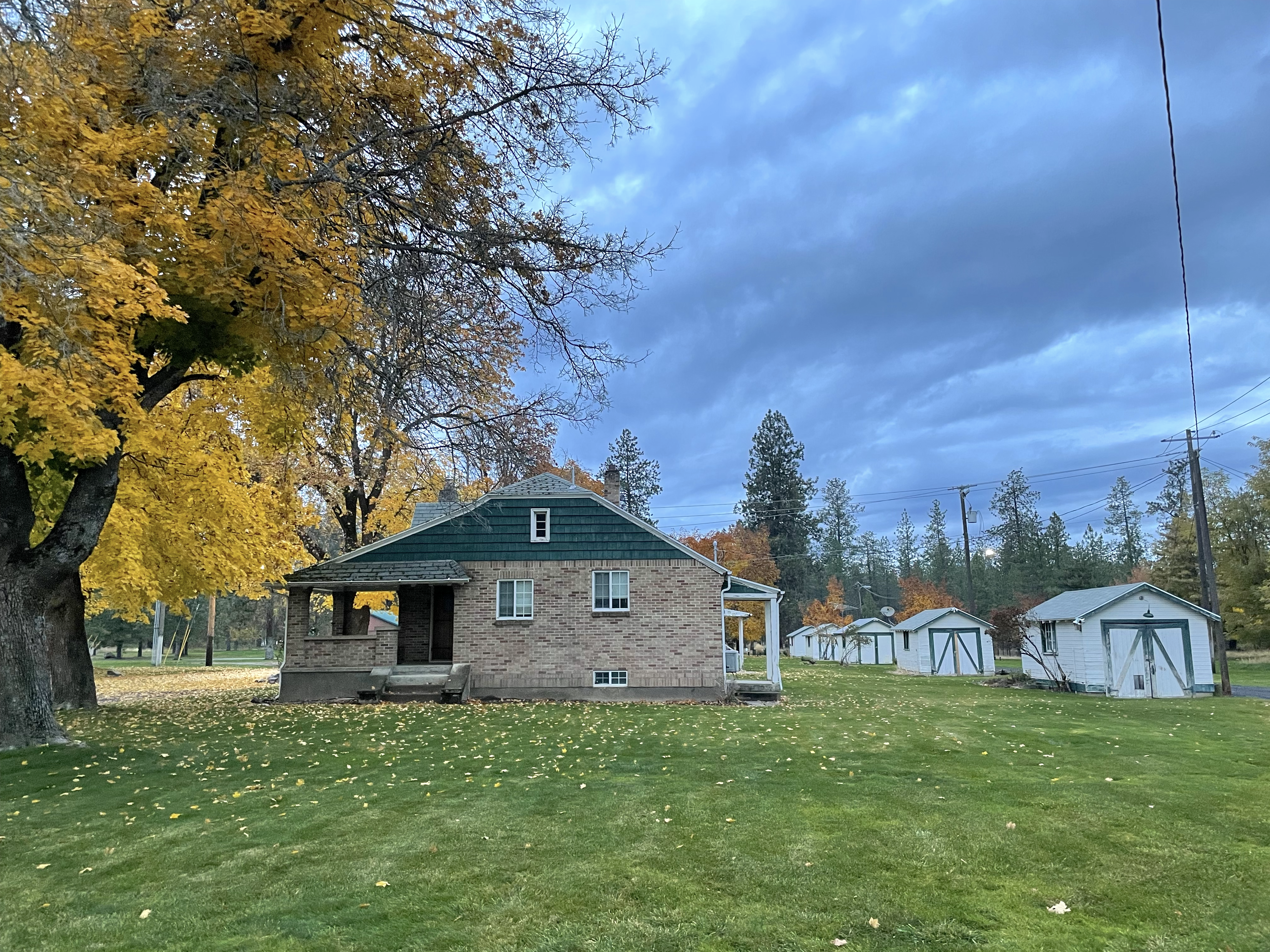
Cottage with yards and sheds in the hydroelectric complex
