= Tumtum, Washington =

Unincorporated community in Washington, United States

- Unincorporated community
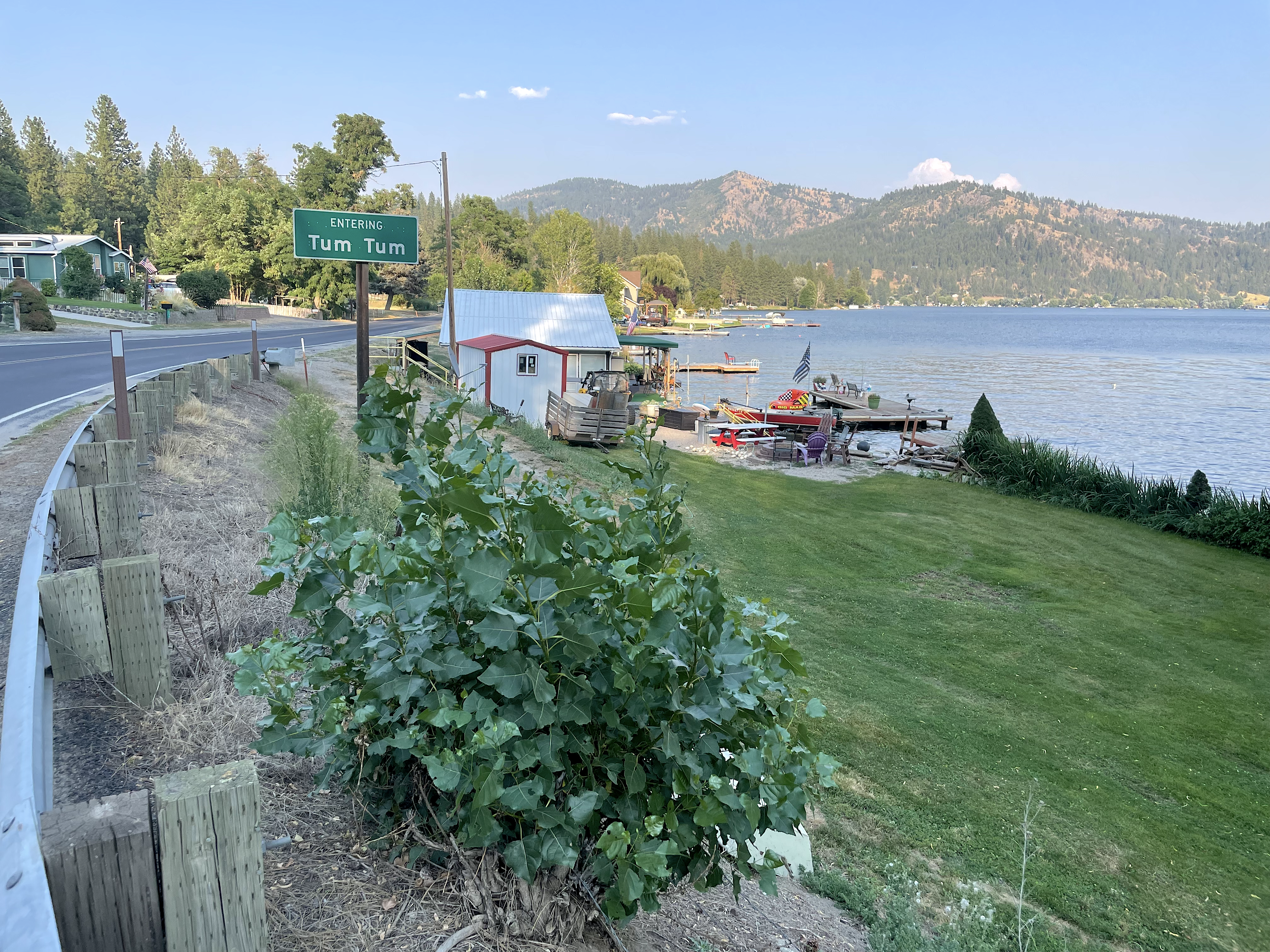
- View from WA-291 looking east

- Location within Washington (state)
- Coordinates: 47°53′30″N 117°40′59″W
- Country: United States
- State: Washington
- County: Stevens
- Elevation: 1,552 ft (473 m)
- Time zone: UTC-8 (Pacific (PST))
  - Summer (DST): UTC-7 (PDT)
- ZIP code: 99034
- Area code: 509
- GNIS feature ID: 1511380

Tumtum is an unincorporated community in Stevens County, Washington, United States. Tumtum is located along the Long Lake of the Spokane River, also known as Lake Spokane, and Washington State Route 291 20 miles (32 km) northwest of Spokane. Tumtum has a ZIP code of 99034.

Tumtum is a Chinook Jargon term meaning "heart/soul".
