= One Spokane Stadium =

Multi-use stadium in Washington, United States

ONE Spokane Stadium

- Aerial view from northeast in October 2023

- Location in the United States Location in Washington
- Interactive map of ONE Spokane Stadium
- Address: 501 W. Gardner Avenue
- Location: Spokane, Washington, U.S.
- Coordinates: 47°40′03″N 117°25′09″W
- Elevation: 1,900 feet (580 m) AMSL
- Owner: Spokane Public Schools
- Operator: Spokane Public Facilities District
- Capacity: 5,000
- Surface: AstroTurf Rootzone 3D
- Record attendance: Soccer: 5,126 (CONCACAF SEA vs. VAN, March 18, 2026)
- Public transit: Spokane Transit Authority
- Parking: 2,000 (shared)

Construction
- Groundbreaking: November 30, 2021
- Opened: September 26, 2023; 3 years ago
- Cost: $37.9 million
- Architect: ALSC Architects
- Builder: Garco Construction

Tenant
- Spokane Public Schools; Spokane Velocity FC (USL1) (2024–present); Spokane Zephyr FC (USLS) (2024–2026)

Website
- https://www.onespokanestadium.com

One Spokane Stadium is a multi-use stadium in the northwestern United States, located in downtown Spokane, Washington. It is home to the Spokane Velocity professional soccer team of USL League One, as well as Spokane Public Schools high school teams in several sports. Opened in September 2023, it succeeds Joe Albi Stadium, the city's football and soccer venue from 1950 through 2021.

The stadium is located in the North Bank district of downtown alongside two other sports facilities: Spokane Veterans Memorial Arena to the southwest and The Podium to the south.

== History ==
=== Background ===
Opened in 1950, Joe Albi Stadium in Northwest Spokane had served as the city's main outdoor stadium for soccer, football, and other large events. Compared to the new Downtown Spokane Stadium, Joe Albi was a much larger stadium with a capacity of 25,000-plus spectators.

By the first decade of the 2000s, the stadium's age began to show and cause issues for tenants. In 2006, the artificial turf was deemed unsafe, which ultimately led to the Spokane Shadow ending their time as tenants. The Spokane and Mead school districts agreed to pay $1 million to replace the turf.

Joe Albi continued to deteriorate over the following years, and by 2017 Spokane Public Schools began exploring options to replace the then 67-year-old stadium. Options floated included demolishing and rebuilding a smaller stadium at the Joe Albi site or building a new stadium downtown. In 2018, the school district's proposals were put to an advisory vote with two separate but related questions posed to voters within District 81 boundaries. One was on a $495 million bond for the school district, $31 million of which would be allocated for the stadium project. The other was on the preferred location of the stadium: the Joe Albi site or downtown. Voters passed the bond proposal, but preferred the Albi site by a 2-to-1 margin.

=== Project moves forward ===
In early 2021, a new proposal to revive the downtown stadium plan was brought forward by the Downtown Spokane Partnership, an organization composed of downtown Spokane business interests. Mark Richard, president of the Downtown Spokane Partnership, along with a representative from the United Soccer League (USL), made a pitch to Spokane Public Schools asking the district to reconsider their plans to build a new stadium at the Joe Albi Site. The new proposal included a promise from USL to bring a professional team to Spokane and to pledge $2 million to the construction. It was also claimed that the central location would be better for parents and students attending high school games. The location adjacent to the Spokane Veterans Memorial Arena and the then under-construction indoor track and field venue The Podium would help create a proper sports and event district in the city center.

Spokane Public Schools voted on the new proposal in May 2021 and approved it by a 4–1 margin. This vote took place after the Spokane Public Facilities District, the agency which manages the adjacent Spokane Arena and the Podium as well as the Spokane Convention Center and First Interstate Center for the Arts across the Spokane River, agreed to meet a set of parameters put forward by the school district. These parameters included parking issues and congestion concerns, as well as ensuring that Spokane Public Schools would retain complete ownership rights over the new stadium.

=== Construction ===
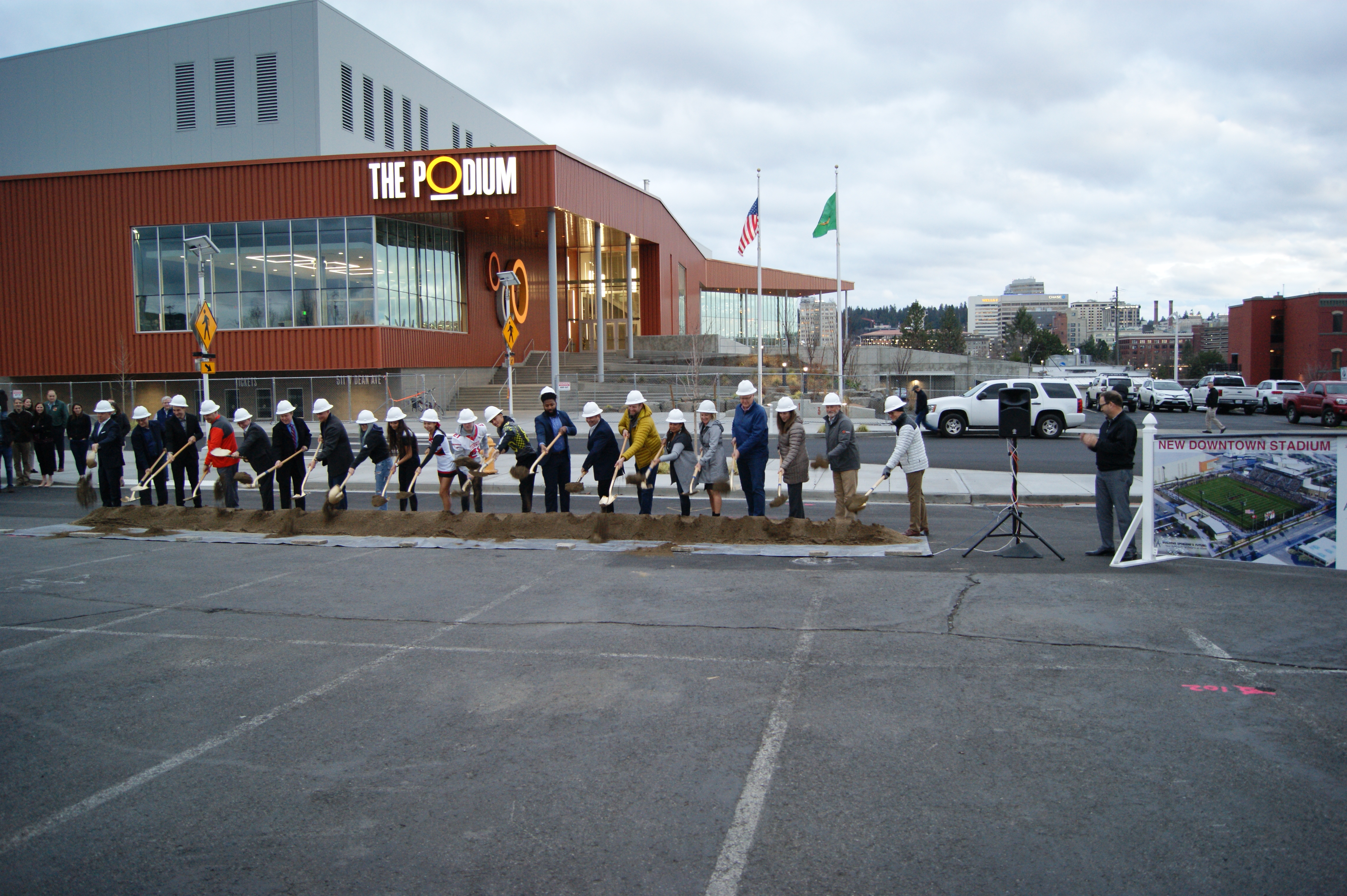
Stadium groundbreaking on November 30, 2021 with The Podium in the background.

Groundbreaking on the stadium took place on November 30, 2021. On May 11, 2023, a topping ceremony took place as the final beam was set in place for the stadium structure. At the time of the topping ceremony, stadium officials expected the stadium would be open for events by the final week of September 2023.

On July 12, 2023, the Spokane Public Schools board of directors voted to approve the name of the stadium as ONE Spokane Stadium. The capitalization of the word "one" in the name is meant to reflect unity among the schools and entities which will use the stadium. A previous named proposed as part of a Kalispel Tribe of Indians sponsorship, "North Bank Stadium", was rejected by the board after the Spokane Tribe raised objections over a lack of consultation for the facility, which is built on their ancestral lands.

The ribbon-cutting ceremony was held on September 26, 2023.

== Facility ==
The stadium is located north of The Podium, separated by Joe Albi Way, previously a section of W Dean Ave. Joe Albi Plaza was created on the southwest corner of the property near the Spokane Civic Theater, and the original statue of Joe Albi was moved to the plaza from the demolished Joe Albi Stadium. There are 17 entry gates along the west, south, and east sides of the facility, with 5,000 permanent seats: 2,491 plastic and 2,509 metal bench. For other events using the field, such as concerts, the facility can accommodate up to 15,000.

The playing field is 98,930 square feet (9,190 m^{2}) of AstroTurf Rootzone 3D artificial turf in a traditional north-south alignment, with the grandstand and press box along the west sideline. While the stadium hosts Spokane Public Schools football and soccer games with both sport lines painted on the field, the field can be repainted for soccer only to abide by USL and FIFA field of play regulations. In the northeast corner is a 20.5-by-36-foot (6.2 m × 11.0 m) Daktronics digital display with 660,960 pixels. An additional 2.5-by-246-foot (0.8 m × 75.0 m) field-level ribbon display is expected to be installed in March 2024.

The approximate elevation of the playing field is 1,900 feet (580 m) above sea level, the highest in the USL Super League.

== Tenants ==
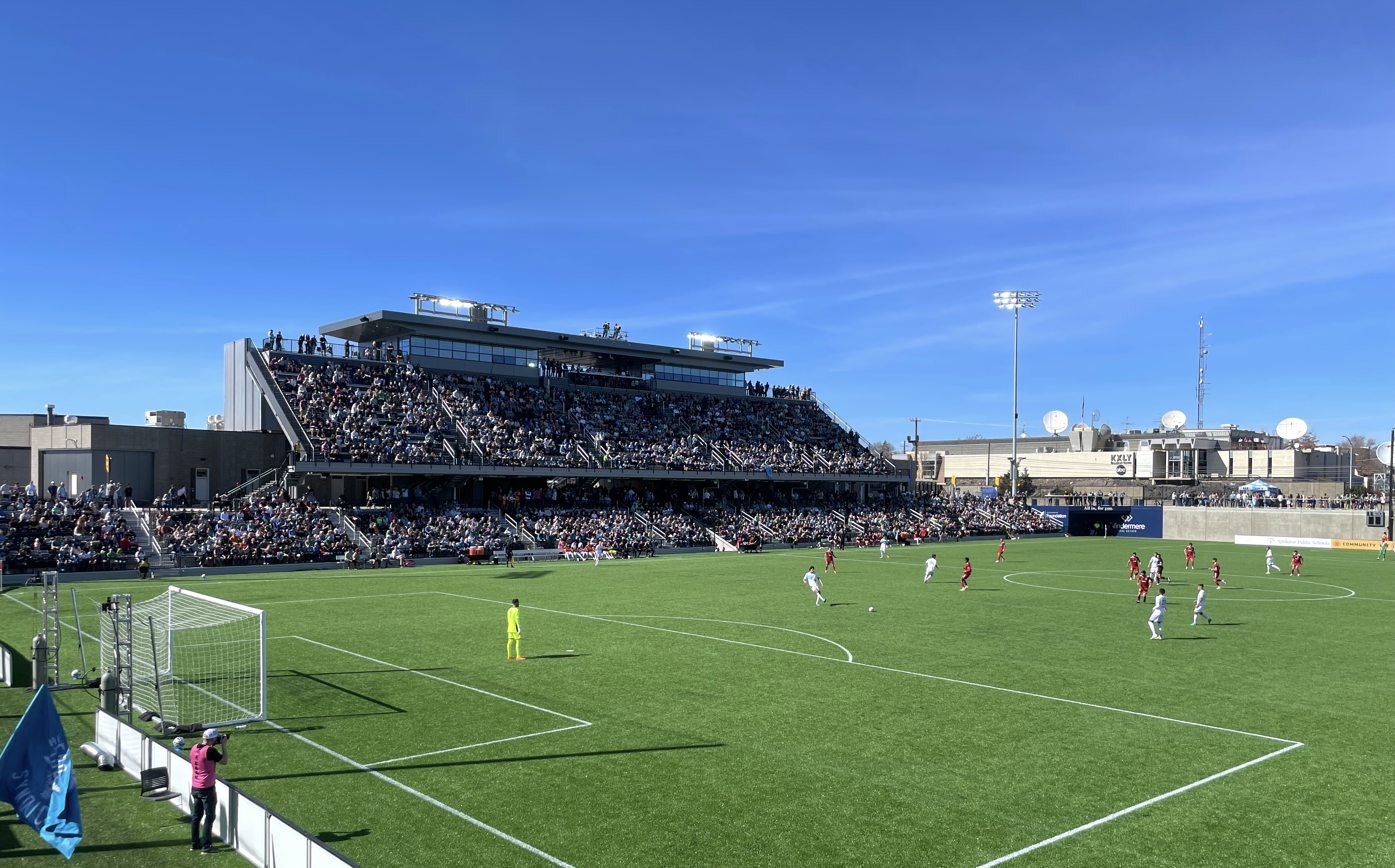
View from southeast of Velocity soccer game in March 2024

The facility is shared by Spokane Public Schools high schools and the United Soccer League.

=== Spokane Public Schools ===
Spokane Public Schools uses the venue for football and soccer games for its five traditional high schools:

- Ferris
- Lewis and Clark
- North Central
- Rogers
- Shadle Park

=== United Soccer League ===
The United Soccer League and franchise owner, Aequus Sports, LLC (led by Ryan and Katie Harnetiaux), announced two professional teams:

- Spokane Velocity FC, a USL League One men's soccer team
- Spokane Zephyr FC, a USL Super League women's soccer team (2024–2026)

=== Temporary teams ===
During preparations for the 2026 FIFA World Cup at Lumen Field in Seattle, two professional soccer teams temporarily played matches at One Spokane Stadium. Seattle Sounders FC of Major League Soccer hosted Vancouver Whitecaps FC in a CONCACAF Champions Cup round of 16 match on March 18. They won 2–1 with a sellout crowd of 5,126 at One Spokane Stadium. Seattle Reign FC played their first three home National Women's Soccer League matches at the stadium against the Kansas City Current, Racing Louisville FC, and Denver Summit FC. The team won two matches and drew in their third; the matches did not sellout, with the highest attendance at 3,952 spectators.
