= Joe Albi Stadium =

Former stadium in Spokane, Washington, U.S.

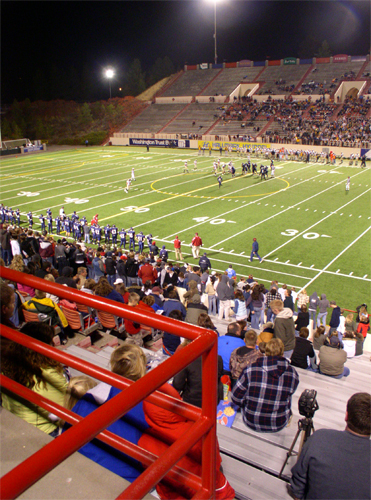
- View from southwest of new FieldTurf in 2006

- Location in the United States Location in Washington
- Interactive map of Joe Albi Stadium
- Former names: Memorial Stadium (1950–1962)
- Address: 4918 W. Everett Avenue
- Location: Spokane, Washington, U.S.
- Coordinates: 47.705°N 117.483°W
- Elevation: 1,890 feet (575 m) AMSL
- Owner: City of Spokane
- Capacity: 28,646 (1996–2022); 35,000 (1962–1995); 25,000 (1950–1961)
- Surface: FieldTurf (2006–2022); AstroTurf (1970–2005); Natural grass (1950–1969)

Construction
- Groundbreaking: April 26, 1950
- Opened: September 15, 1950; 76 years ago
- Renovated: 1996
- Expanded: 1962
- Closed: January 2022
- Demolished: March–August 2022
- Cost: $496,558 ($6.64 million in 2025)
- Structural engineers: Moffat, Nichol, & Taylor
- Main contractors: McInnis and Henry George & Sons

Tenants
- Washington State Cougars (1950–1983); Eastern Washington Eagles (1965–1966, 1983–1989); Spokane Shadow (PDL) (1996–2005); Spokane Spiders (PDL) (2010); Spokane Black Widows (WPSL) (2010); Spokane Shock (AFL) (2011); Spokane Shine (WPSL) (2011)

Joe Albi Stadium was an outdoor multi-purpose stadium in Spokane, Washington, United States. It was located in the northwest part of the city, just east of the Spokane River. The stadium was primarily used for high school football, as a secondary home field for the Washington State Cougars, and for minor league soccer.

The venue opened in 1950 on the site of a former U.S. Army hospital, and was originally known as Memorial Stadium. It was renamed in 1962 for local civic leader Joe Albi, who spearheaded efforts to build more sporting facilities in Spokane. After more than seventy years of service, it closed in early 2022 and was demolished; its successor is the new One Spokane Stadium in downtown Spokane, just northeast of the Spokane Arena.

== History ==
The stadium is located on part of the former site of the U.S. Army's Baxter General Hospital, which operated on the site during World War II between March 1943 and December 12, 1945. Built in less than four months in 1950, it opened as "Spokane Memorial Stadium" on September 15 with high school football. The name was selected through a newspaper contest and adopted by the city council in July. Its original grass field was taken from the lush sod of the parade grounds at historic Fort George Wright, south of the stadium. The lighted venue had a seating capacity of 25,000 but did not have a running track; city track and field continued at Hart Field (47.622°N 117.4044°W) in south Spokane. High school football was previously played at wooden Gonzaga Stadium, until it was deemed unsafe after the 1947 season. For the next two seasons, the high schools played at Ferris Field, a minor league ballpark just west of the Playfair horse track.

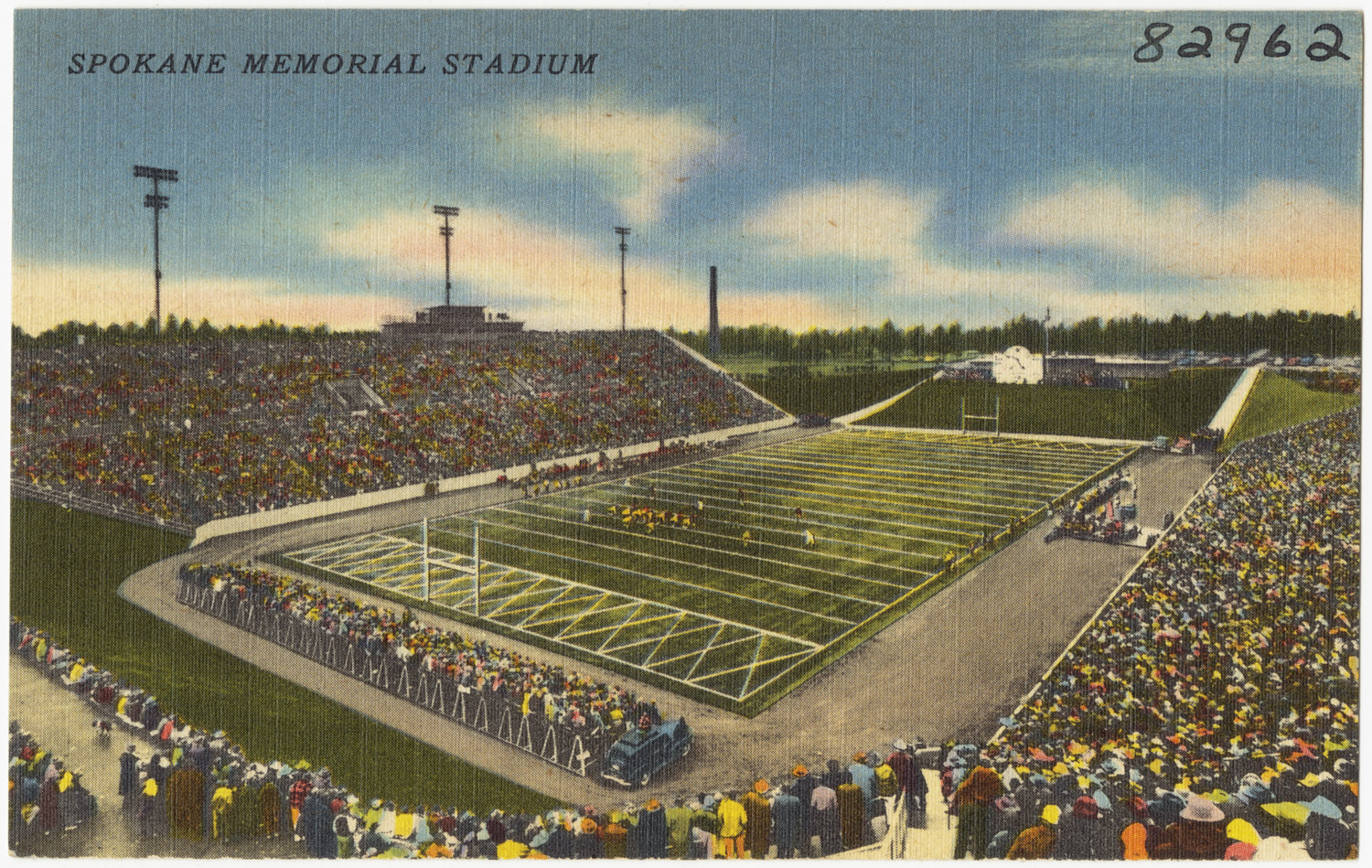
Spokane Memorial Stadium

On Saturday, November 25, 1950, Memorial Stadium was officially presented to the city by attorney Joseph A. Albi, leader of the Athletic Round Table (ART), and dedicated by Governor Arthur Langlie. The ceremonies were prior to the kickoff of the Washington–Washington State football game (now known as the Apple Cup). The rivalry game had been absent from the city for forty years, last played in Spokane in 1910.

The first manager of the stadium was Fred Bohler, the former coach and athletic director at Washington State College in Pullman. In 1954, it was considered as a potential minor league baseball venue; Indians Stadium (now Avista Stadium) opened in 1958.

Memorial Stadium was renamed in the spring of 1962 for Albi (1892–1962), a local sports booster who led the efforts to fund and construct it. A bronze statue of Albi was unveiled in 1997 at the stadium. Seated several rows above the field in the southwest corner bleachers, the 600-pound (270 kg) statue is often adorned in the school colors of competing teams.

In the summer of 1962, the field level was lowered by 11 feet (3.4 m) and 7,000 seats were added. AstroTurf was first installed in 1970, and was replaced with SuperTurf in 1979, and 1984. The playing surface was altered for professional soccer in 1996, essentially undoing the lowering project of 1962. The field level was raised 6 1/2 feet (2.0 m) and the width of the new artificial turf was extended to 250 feet (76 m), formerly at 191 feet (58 m), and seating was removed. The field was changed a decade later to infilled FieldTurf in 2006.

The stadium, in its final configuration, had a seating capacity of 28,646, and the playing field runs in the traditional north–south configuration at an elevation of 1,890 feet (575 m) above sea level. Located at the top of the west grandstand; the press box was rebuilt in 1978.

=== Modern use and replacement ===
The stadium was used extensively for high school football and marching band competitions. The former mayor of Spokane, the late Jim West, proposed to sell Joe Albi to a real estate developer interested in demolishing the stadium and turning it into a housing development. After a back and forth struggle, plans to raze the stadium were scrapped.

Amid the debate about what to do with the aging stadium, an issue about its artificial turf surfaced. As a result of the turf being beyond its useful life in early 2006 and deemed unsafe, the Spokane Shadow discontinued its usage of Joe Albi Stadium, citing that the playing surface was too dangerous for PDL soccer games. As a consequence, the PDL terminated the Shadow's membership. A short time later, the playing surface dilemma was solved when the Spokane and Mead school districts agreed to share the cost of replacing the tired AstroTurf with infilled FieldTurf, which was installed in August 2006 for under $700,000. The investment by the two school districts ensures that Joe Albi will endure for at least the life of the new FieldTurf, estimated to be about a decade.

In 2011, professional soccer returned to Spokane with the Spokane Shine calling the stadium home.

In 2017, Spokane Public Schools announced that it was exploring options to replace Joe Albi Stadium with a smaller, 5,000-seat facility in Downtown Spokane that would host a professional United Soccer League team. The Albi Stadium site would be used for new sports fields. An advisory vote in November 2018 approved development of the stadium project on the site of Joe Albi Stadium, which was funded as part of a $495 million capital bond for the school district approved in the same election. On May 5, 2021, the school district board voted 4–1 in favor of building the new stadium in downtown Spokane after reaching an agreement with the Spokane Public Facilities District; just south of the stadium site, a middle school (Pauline Flett) was built, which opened in September 2022.

A concert, proposed by Sammy Hagar, was scheduled for 2020 as a final event for the stadium; however, that plan was shelved due to the COVID-19 pandemic. The concert plan was brought up again in February 2021 with the idea of holding the concert in late August, but it was ultimately scuttled due to issues involving COVID-19 restrictions and limited scheduling time.

Demolition permits for the stadium were formally filed with the city in January 2022, with the stadium undergoing dust abatement before demolition commenced in March; the process was completed by the following August, with the stadium's concrete blocks pulverized (after undergoing asbestos abatement due to its presence in the caulk used to hold them together) and used as land levelling filler for the site. Some of the salvaged bleachers will be donated to the Cheney and Chewelah school districts, while the statue of Albi will be relocated to the new downtown stadium.

== Events and tenants ==
=== College football ===
==== Washington State Cougars ====
Prior to 1984, the WSU Cougars played several home games each season at Joe Albi Stadium, usually before classes began in Pullman in late September. During the stadium's first thirty years (1950–80), WSU hosted the Apple Cup at Joe Albi in the even-numbered years (except 1954), rather than on-campus in Pullman. The Cougars won only three of the fifteen (.200) Apple Cups played at the Spokane venue (1958, 1968, 1972). Since the rivalry game returned to Pullman in 1982, the Cougars have won seven of 21 (1982, 1988, 1992, 1994, 2004, 2008, 2012) at Martin Stadium through 2026, a winning percentage of .333.

In 1970 and 1971, the Cougars played their entire home schedule at Joe Albi, after the south grandstand at the wooden Rogers Field stadium on the Pullman campus was damaged by fire in April 1970. The neighboring Idaho Vandals played their home games at Rogers Field in 1969 & 1970 (after the fire), as its wooden Neale Stadium in Moscow had been condemned during the summer of 1969. On September 19, 1970, WSU and Idaho met up in their annual "Battle of the Palouse," which became known as the "Displaced Bowl" (since neither team was able to play on their home field); the Cougars dominated the second half (38–0) to win 44–16 at Joe Albi in their only victory of the season.

Washington State last played regular season football games at Joe Albi Stadium in 1983, when the Cougars defeated both Montana State and UNLV in September. Following the revision of the WSU academic calendar in 1984 (the fall semester starting a month earlier in late August), the Cougars have played all of their eastern Washington home games at Martin Stadium in Pullman.

==== Idaho Vandals ====
The Idaho Vandals of Moscow played a home game at the stadium in its second year in 1951, a conference loss to Oregon State. Another came twenty years later in 1971, a 10–0 shutout of Colorado State on September 25, led by running back Lawrence McCutcheon.

==== Eastern Washington Eagles ====
Until the 2004 upgrade of Woodward Field, Joe Albi Stadium was occasionally used by the Eastern Washington Eagles of the Big Sky Conference. Through the 2003 season, it was used for the higher-attended EWU home games, primarily against Idaho, Montana, and Montana State.

=== Professional football ===
On the professional level, the field has hosted several exhibition games. In 1953, the stadium hosted the first-ever NFL preseason game in the state of Washington when the Chicago Cardinals defeated the Green Bay Packers 13–7 on August 29, before about 17,000 spectators. It went on to host six more NFL preseason games, with the last one occurring in 1976. In 1971, the San Francisco 49ers defeated the Denver Broncos in an NFL pre-season game on August 28. In 1974, the Denver Broncos defeated the New England Patriots in an NFL pre-season game on August 31. The expansion Seattle Seahawks of the NFL played their second preseason game in franchise history at Joe Albi on August 7, 1976, a 27–16 loss to the Chicago Bears.

In 1961, the Calgary Stampeders defeated the Saskatchewan Roughriders 14–7 in a CFL pre-season game on Tuesday night, August 1. A few weeks later, the American Football League (AFL), embarking on its second year, held a pre-season game on August 19; the Denver Broncos defeated the Oakland Raiders 48–21.

In 2011, the stadium hosted an outdoor arena football game on July 9, when the visiting Utah Blaze took on the hometown Spokane Shock.

=== Other events ===
Over the years it has hosted various events: concerts (including Elvis Presley in 1957), rodeos, and auto races. In 1982, evangelist Billy Graham drew a total of 223,500 in eight nights in late August during his Inland Empire Crusade, which was at the time more people than the population of Spokane. The finale on August 29 had a record-breaking attendance for the stadium, estimated at 38,000.

One scene in the 1985 film “Vision Quest” was shot there.
