= Spokane Shine =

- Full name: Spokane Shine
- Nickname(s): The Shine
- Founded: 2010
- Ground: Joe Albi Stadium
- Capacity: 28,646
- Coach: (United States) Jason Quintero
- League: Women's Premier Soccer League
- 2011: 2nd, Northwest Division
Home colors	Away colors

Spokane Shine is an American women's soccer team, founded in 2010 in the city of Spokane, Washington. The team is a member of the Women's Premier Soccer League (WPSL), the second tier of women's soccer in the United States. The team plays in the Northwest Division of the league. The team was born after the Spokane Black Widows WPSL team ceased to exist.

The team plays its home games at Joe Albi Stadium in Spokane. The club's colors are yellow and cobalt blue.

== Players ==
=== 2012 roster ===
Note: Flags indicate national team as defined under FIFA eligibility rules; some limited exceptions apply. Players may hold more than one non-FIFA nationality.

No.	Pos.	Nation	Player
—	GK	(Canada) CAN	Shannon Delarosbil
—	GK	(United States) USA	Mariah Hebbe
—	GK	(United States) USA	Sarah Wood
—	MF	(United States) USA	Jael Hagerott
—	DF	(United States) USA	Chelsea Breen
—	FW	(United States) USA	Ashley Ames
—	DF	(United States) USA	Mya Anger
—	MF	(United States) USA	Jaime Balcom
—	FW	(United States) USA	Korynn Blanksma
—	MF	(United States) USA	Aubrey Bot
—	DF	(United States) USA	Nicole Fox
—	DF	(United States) USA	Erica Hart
—	FW	(United States) USA	Hannah Holm
—	MF	(United States) USA	Bri Kerley
—	DF	(United States) USA	Shannon Lindsay
—	FW	(United States) USA	Megan Lindsay
—	FW	(United States) USA	Kara Marbury

No.	Pos.	Nation	Player
—	MF	(United States) USA	Marissa Mykines
—	FW	(United States) USA	Heidi Nakaoka
—	DF	(United States) USA	Morgan O'Friel
—	MF	(United States) USA	Lauren Pendegraft
—	FW	(United States) USA	Tiara Pittman
—	FW	(United States) USA	Julisa Rodriguez
—	DF	(Canada) CAN	Morgan Roesler
—	MF	(United States) USA	Kasey Rubosky
—	FW	(United States) USA	Katie Spangenberg
—	DF	(United States) USA	Elle Sweeney
—	FW	(United States) USA	Kellie Zakrewski

== Year-by-year ==
Year	Division	League	Reg. season	Playoffs
2011	2	WPSL	2nd, Northwest Division	

== Coaches ==
- (United States) Jason Quintero 2011–present

== Stadia ==
- Stadium at Joe Albi Stadium; Spokane, Washington, 2011–present
