= Megan Lindsay =

French footballer (born 1991)

Personal information
- Full name: Megan Anne Lindsay
- Date of birth: April 7, 1991 (age 35)
- Height: 5 ft 8 in (1.73 m)
- Position: Forward

Youth career
- 2005–2007: NWN Allegra
- –2009: Gonzaga Prep Bullpups
- 2008: Washington Premier 90

College career
Years	Team	Apps	(Gls)
2009–2012	Seattle Pacific Falcons	75	(41)

Senior career*
Years	Team	Apps	(Gls)
2010	Spokane Shine		
2011–2013	Seattle Sounders		
2013	Stjarnan	8	(2)
2014	Kokkola F10	18	(11)
2014	→ Åland United (loan)	0	(0)
2014–2015	Metz	14	(7)
2015	Røa	11	(3)
- * Club domestic league appearances and goals

Megan Anne Lindsay (born April 7, 1991) is an American former professional soccer player who played as a forward. Lindsay played for the Seattle Pacific Falcons in college, and later played overseas at Stjarnan in Iceland, Kokkola F10 and Åland United in Finland, Metz in France, and Røa in Norway.

In 2017 she was a tryout invitee for the North Carolina Courage during the team's pre-season training camp, but did not make the team.
