= The Podium (sports facility) =

Multi-use indoor sport and entertainment venue in Spokane, Washington

The Podium Powered by STCU

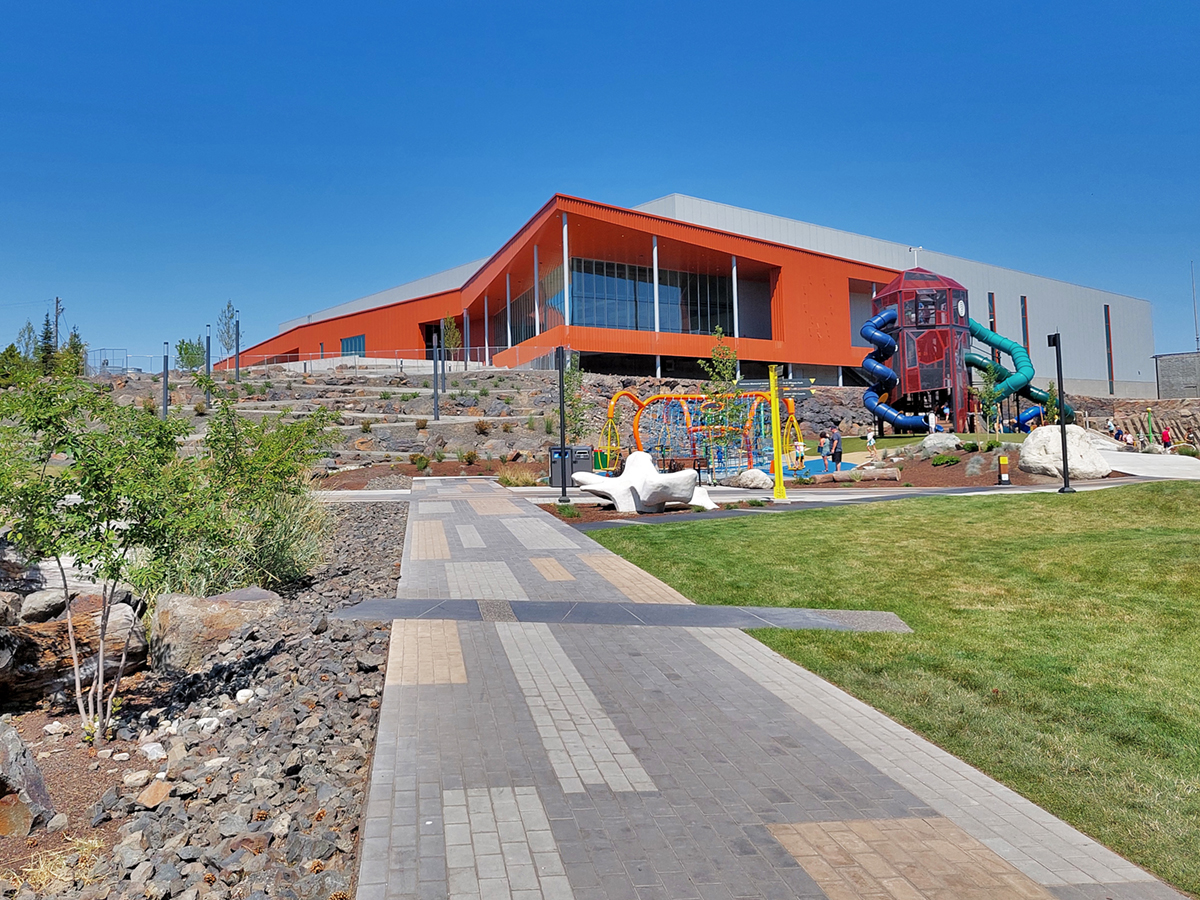
- View from the southwest in July 2021

- Location in the United States Location in Washington
- Address: 511 West Dean Avenue; Spokane, Washington
- Coordinates: 47.6656°N 117.4198°W
- Elevation: 1,907 ft (581 m)
- Owner: Spokane Public Facilities District
- Operator: Spokane Public Facilities District
- Capacity: 4,237
- Public transit: Spokane Transit Authority buses

Construction
- Groundbreaking: December 11, 2019
- Opened: December 2021
- Cost: $53 million
- Architects: Integrus Architecture; Davis Architects
- Builder: Lydig Construction

Tenants
- GNAC Indoor Track & Field Championships (2022–present)

Website
- https://www.thepodiumusa.com/

The Podium Powered by STCU is a 135,000-square-foot (12,500 m^{2}) indoor multi-use sports facility located in Spokane, Washington, United States.

It is located in the North Bank area adjacent to Spokane Veterans Memorial Arena and One Spokane Stadium. The arena is north of Downtown Spokane and Riverfront Park.

== History ==
=== Planning ===
In an effort to expand Spokane's footprint in the sports tourism industry, proposals to build a sportsplex in the city began in the early 2000s. A development plan was later formed in 2014 with the goal of building an indoor multi-sport complex. A report issued by Gonzaga University around this time estimated that a sportsplex could bring an additional $33 million of tourism spending into the region annually.

The Spokane Public Facilities District (SPFD), which was tentatively identified as the agency that would own and operate the sportsplex, then paid for a study to investigate the feasibility of such a venue in Spokane. A draft of the study, performed by Florida-based Sports Facility Advisory, was released in October 2015 and confirmed the economic viability of the project. The study projected the project to generate more than $101 million in economic impact in its first five years of operation.

In September 2015, three local construction companies submitted proposals to compete for the contract to construct the sportsplex, which was procured under a design–build contract method. The contract was not awarded until 2018, in part due to uncertainty in the project's program and funding.

=== Schedule and funding ===
In August 2018, the project's design and construction was awarded to the design-build team of Lydig Construction and Integrus Architecture.

A revised schedule was released, identifying construction to begin in 2019, with an anticipated completion date in 2021. Final funding for the project consisted of $25 million in bonds sold by Spokane County and subsequently loaned to the PFD, $5 million from the City of Spokane, and a land donation by the Spokane Parks and Recreation Department. The balance of the project's initial $42 million cost would be funded by an existing tax as well as funds from the PFD's reserves.

By late 2019, due to escalation in labor and construction material costs, the price of the project increased by about $10 million, up to $53 million. To address the shortfall, the Spokane County Board of Commissioners unanimously approved to sell an additional $10 million in bonds that would be repaid by the PFD by 2043.

=== Design and programming ===
Initial plans called for an NHL-size ice skating rink, however the rink was eventually removed from the final design as the economic viability of adding just a single rink to the facility was unclear; the facility would need multiple rinks to attract tournaments and other activities.

Although the project was not part of Riverfront Park's simultaneous redevelopment project, the architectural and site design of The Podium integrates with the park's newer features. A switchback trail from the building's entrance descends down the building's basalt outcropping, connecting directly with Riverfront Park's new Howard Street promenade and regional playground. The building's south terrace also overlooks the skyline of Downtown Spokane and the park's US Pavilion.

=== Construction ===
Demolition work to clear the site began in early 2019, and the official groundbreaking ceremony was held on December 11, 2019.

The construction of The Podium also had impacts on local streets. The large size of the building necessitated the permanent closure and modification of Cataldo Avenue and Dean Avenue. Cataldo was closed in fall 2019 to make room for the building, while Dean Avenue would be improved to better facilitate pedestrians, public transit, and drop-off zones accessing The Podium. Initial plans called for Cataldo to be closed in its entirety between Howard and Washington Streets, but a 166-foot segment of Cataldo Avenue was maintained and converted into a cul-de-sac for local business access.

Construction of The Podium continued in 2020 through the COVID-19 pandemic, with social distancing and other COVID safety measures in place. It was deemed an essential construction project and allowed to continue due to the facility's potential role in the community as a future mass care facility, as well as contractual commitments to booked events.

=== Naming ===
Throughout its planning and initial construction stages, the facility was referred to as the Spokane Regional Sportsplex, or simply the Spokane Sportsplex. In August 2020, an official name for the facility, still under construction, was announced as "The Podium," inspired by the medal ceremony at sporting events as well as the facility's positioning atop a 15-foot (4.6 m) basalt rock outcropping that overlooks Riverfront Park and downtown Spokane. In June 2022, Spokane Teachers Credit Union sponsored the venue with a ten-year naming contract, which renamed the venue to The Podium Powered by STCU.

=== Attention ===
In February 2021, SportsTravel magazine declared The Podium as one of sixteen "New Sports Venues to Watch in 2021".

In October 2022, SportsTravel announced The Podium as the 'Best New or Renovated Venue" of 2022 in the United States.

== Facilities ==
The Podium features 135,000 sq ft (12,500 m^{2}) of total floor area, of which 75,000 sq ft (7,000 m^{2}) is dedicated competition space. The main competition space includes a six-lane, 200-meter hydraulically banked indoor track, and can also accommodate 16 volleyball courts, 9 basketball courts, 21 wrestling mats, and other multi-sport layouts.

== Major events ==
- 2022 USA Track & Field (USATF) Indoor Championships, held February 25–26, 2022.
- 2022 USA Karate National Championships, held June 30 – July 3, 2022.
- 2023 USA Wrestling Women's National Championships, held April 14–16, 2023.
- 2023 USA Team Handball US Open and Junior National Championships, held May 11–14, 2023.
- 2023 USA Judo Senior National Championships, held May 20–21, 2023.
- 2023 USA Badminton Junior National Championships, held June 25 – July 2, 2023.
- 2023 Badminton World Federation World Junior Championships, held September 24 – October 8, 2023.
- 2024 USA Wrestling Women's National Championships, held April 12–14, 2024.
- 2024 USA Team Handball US Open and Junior National Championships, held May 9–12, 2024.
- 2025 USA Wrestling Women's National Championships, held April 11–13, 2025.

=== College athletics ===
- The Great Northwest Athletic Conference, which competes at the NCAA Division II intermediate level, held its annual Indoor Track and Field Championships at The Podium from 2022 onward, through at least 2024.
