= Numerica Veterans Arena =

Multi-use indoor arena in Spokane, Washington

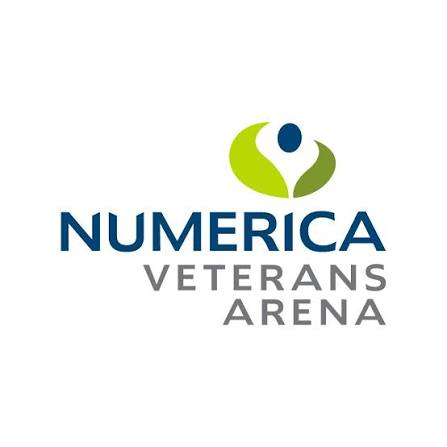

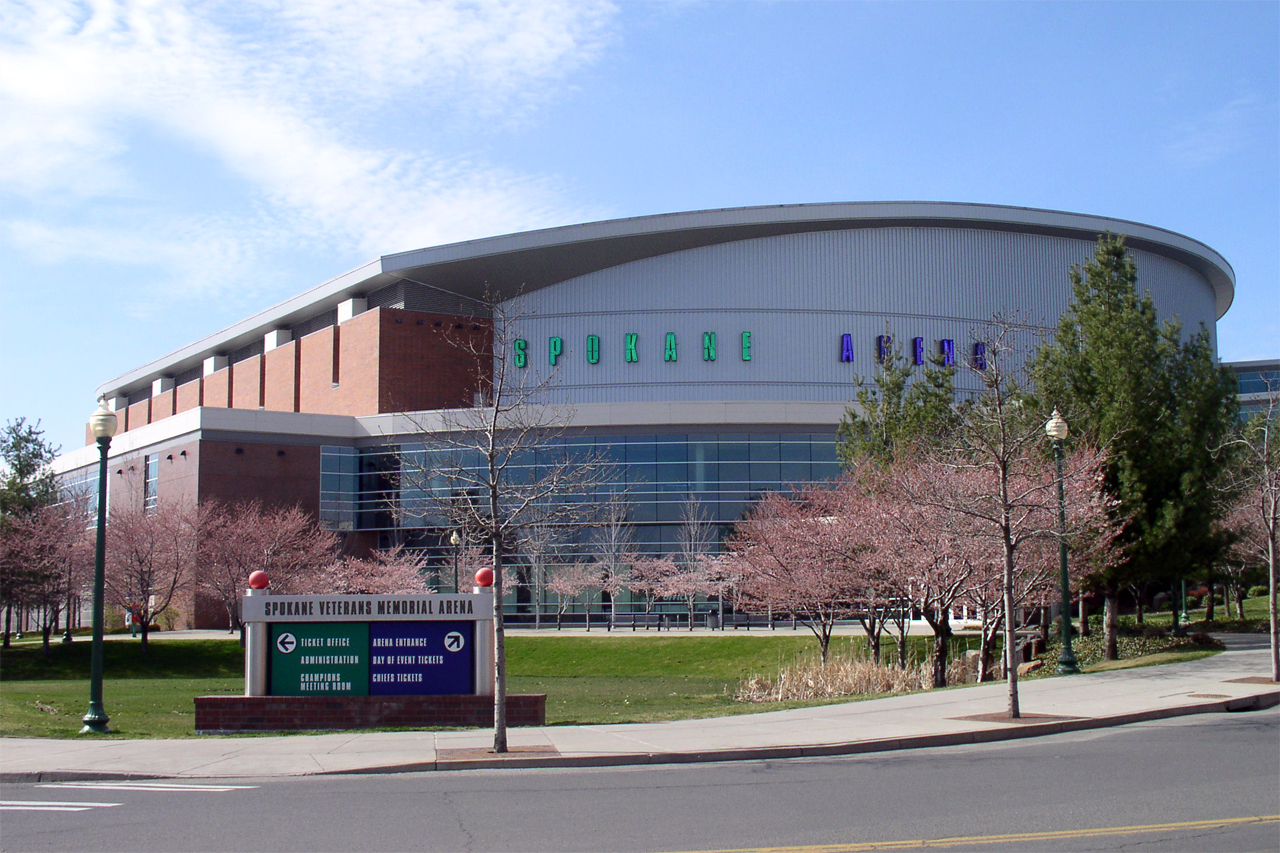
- View from southeast in 2007

- Location in the United States Location in Washington
- Interactive map of Numerica Veterans Arena
- Address: 720 W. Mallon Avenue
- Location: Spokane, Washington, U.S.
- Coordinates: 47°39′57.6″N 117°25′22.8″W
- Owner: Spokane Public Facilities District
- Operator: Spokane Public Facilities District
- Capacity: End Stage concert: 12,638; Basketball: 12,210; Hockey: 10,366; Indoor football: 10,771; Expansion possibilities: 14,000+
- Surface: Multi-surface
- Public transit: Spokane Transit Authority (STA); STA Shuttle 11

Construction
- Groundbreaking: March 5, 1993
- Opened: September 10, 1995; 31 years ago
- Cost: $62.6 million ($132 million in 2025)
- Architects: ALSC Architects; Ellerbe Becket
- General contractor: Garco Construction

Tenants
- Spokane Chiefs (WHL) (1995–present); Spokane Shock (AF2/AFL/IFL) (2006–2015, 2021); Lilac City Legends (USBL) (2026–)

Numerica Veterans Arena, formerly known as Spokane Arena and Spokane Veterans Memorial Arena, is a multi-purpose arena in the northwestern United States, located in downtown Spokane, Washington. Opened 31 years ago in 1995, it is home to the Spokane Chiefs of the Western Hockey League (WHL) and Lilac City Legends of the United States Basketball League (USBL).

== Facility ==
=== Construction ===
With an undersized and aging Spokane Coliseum (1954) needing replacement, the Spokane City Council and Board of Spokane County Commissioners formed the Spokane Public Facilities District (SPFD) to acquire, construct, own, and operate sports and entertainment facilities with contiguous parking facilities. In 1990, the SPFD board members unanimously agreed to the following recommendations from an economic feasibility/market study. The recommendations were:

- To build an arena, rather than a domed stadium,
- Have a seating capacity of 12,000 to 14,000, with expansion capabilities,
- On city-owned land located adjacent to the old coliseum with on-site parking for 2,000 automobiles.

Voters rejected the Spokane Arena four times in six years before agreeing to build it in 1991.

In the fall of that year, two ballot measures were put out to voters and passed:

- One, to publicly finance the construction of the arena through a property tax bond issue worth $38 million,

- Two, a measure to validate the SPFD; validation was vital because it allowed the district to implement a 2% hotel tax to fund construction further.

In the fall of 1991, another funding measure was put out to voters and was passed. It involved a 0.1% rise in the sales tax. The passage of all three measures completed the $44.8 million financing needed to build the arena.

Ground was broken on March 5, 1993, and it opened 2½ years later, in September 1995.

=== Seating ===
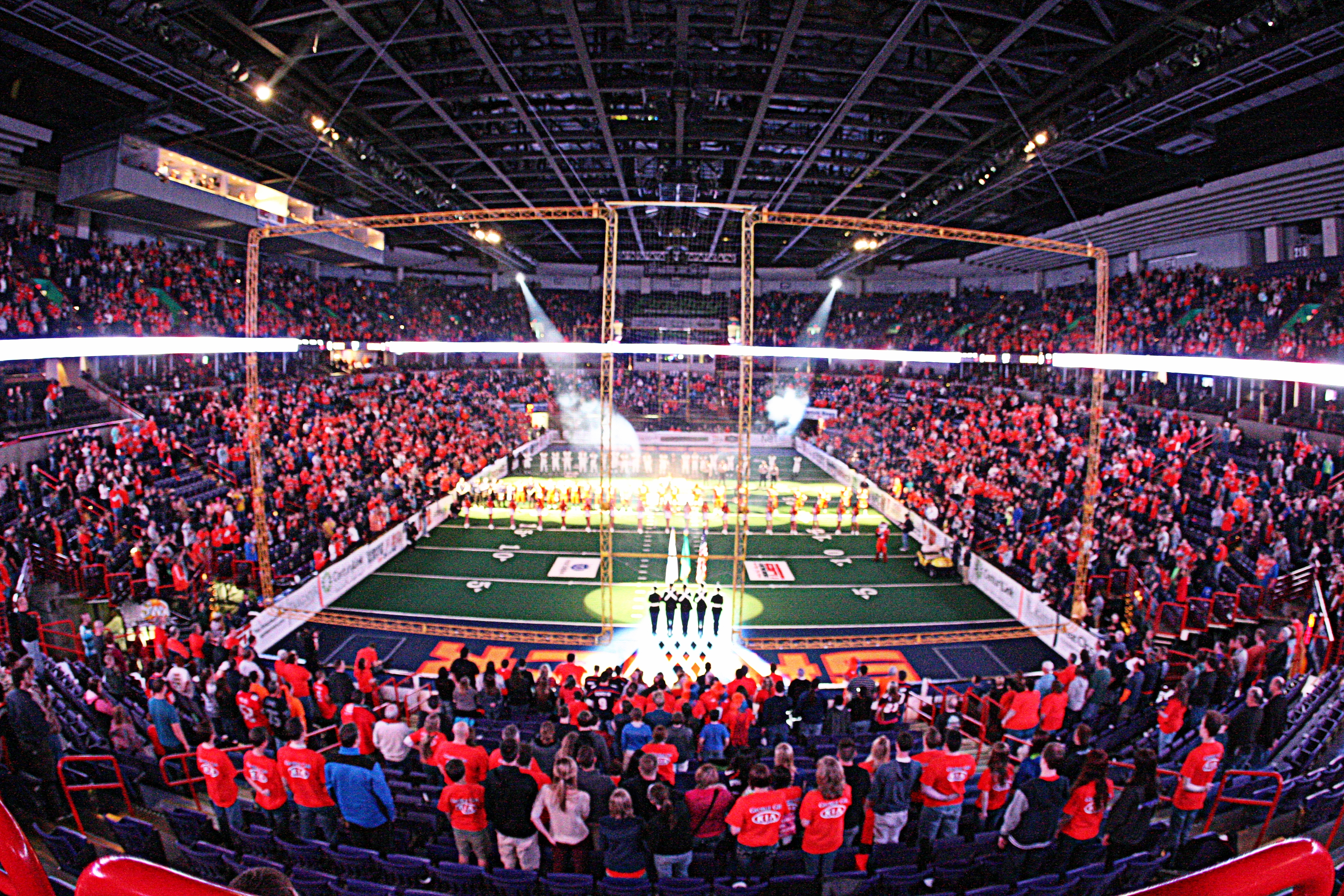
Arena football configuration in 2013

Numerica Veterans Arena has a capacity for:

- 12,638 for end-stage concerts
- 12,494 for center-stage shows
- 12,210 for basketball
- 10,771 for arena football
- 10,366 for ice hockey
- 6,951 for half-house shows

The arena has a state-of-the-art audio and video system. It consists of a 15-by-20-foot (4.6 by 6.1 m) Viacom Sports 12 mm LED display that can be used as two separate units. The video board has exceptional color reproduction and the best off-angle viewing available for any LED format. It can even be moved forward approximately 100 feet (30 m) and down to approximately 20 feet (6 m) off the arena floor. The arena also features a 350° color LED ribbon board mounted on the fascia of the Spokane Arena bowl. It can display text messages, animations, logos, scores, and statistics.

Powered by Crown Amplifiers, the audio system is driven by Community RS880 speakers in the arena bowl, Altec Lansing satellite speakers for the upper seating areas, and Bose speakers serve the concourse, dressing rooms, and backstage hallways.

Large public areas are among the key features of the Numerica Veterans Arena. The arena floor is 32,000 square feet (2,970 m^{2}), and the 14-foot (4.3 m) high concourse is a spacious 35,000 square feet (3,250 m^{2}). Sixteen luxury suites contain a total of 146 seats. In addition, there are six meeting rooms, totaling 10,050 square feet (930 m^{2}) of meeting space.

On the Events Level, there are five truck docks with 8-by-10-foot (2.4 by 3.0 m) loading doors, one 8-by-10-foot (2.4 by 3.0 m) drive-in door, and one 20-by-24-foot (6.1 by 7.3 m) drive-in loading door, allowing large shows to load and unload eight trucks simultaneously. Trucks can load and unload unobstructed, directly into the marshalling area at the arena floor's west end. Backstage are three star dressing rooms, two promoter offices (located in the marshalling area), even team dressing rooms, and a dressing room for officials.

The elevation at street level is approximately 1,900 feet (580 m) above sea level.

=== 2012 expansion/future ===
Incorporated into its original design was an area designated for future arena expansion. Expansion of the upper bowl would raise the seating capacity of the arena to over 15,000. In 2011, the Spokane Public Facilities District became concerned that the NCAA might tighten its criteria and require a true minimum of 12,000, with no allowance for seats lost due to tournament infrastructure. In early 2012, the Spokane Public Facilities District had "Measure 1" put on the April ballot, which was proposing to extend 0.1% sales tax and a 2% room tax to pay for a 91,000-square-foot addition to the Convention Center and other projects, including adding 750 seats to the arena.

Measure 1 passed, and all seats were replaced with additional seats, increasing total capacity to 12,000. In addition, a center-hung scoreboard was installed. Total cost was estimated at $3.547 million.

In 2023, the Arena underwent another renovation, including updates to retractable seating, upgrades to lighting, and improvements to locker room showers. The renovation closed the Arena for three months, and the total cost was estimated at $10 million.

== Events ==
=== Sports ===
==== Basketball ====
Numerica Veterans Arena, in addition to its duties as being the host of Chiefs and Shock games, also has served as a secondary home for the men's basketball programs of Gonzaga University and Washington State University for nearly every year since opened. Washington State has played 33 matchups in the Numerica Veterans Arena in 19 of the 22 years, with a record of 18–15 (1–7 vs. ranked opponents), while Gonzaga has hosted 18 games in 15 of the 22 years, with a record of 12–6 (1–2 vs. ranked opponents). In-state rivals Washington State and Gonzaga have met in the arena five times (1995, 1996, 1998, 1999, and 2014), with the Zags owning a 3–2 record against the Cougars. The Bulldogs' faced off against local rival Eastern Washington University at the arena in four consecutive years (2002, 2003, 2004, and 2005), each won by the Zags, but just like with the Cougars, the rivalry has gone dormant due to the rise of the Zags' program to major status since the late 1990s, while the Cougars and Eagles have not seen much national spotlight. Washington State has often hosted home games at the Numerica Veterans Arena as a part of its Pac-12 Conference men's basketball schedule, holding a 7–9 record against conference foes in the arena, facing UCLA (1996 and 2004), Oregon (1997 and 2011), Oregon State (1997, 2011, and 2017), Arizona (1998, 2001, and 2006), Washington (1999), USC (2000 and 2004), Stanford (2004), California (2005), and Colorado (2014). With Gonzaga's rise to prominence, the Zags were able to bring high major schools like Washington (1998), Georgia (2003), Memphis (2007, 2009, and 2011) and Oklahoma (2009) to the Spokane Arena, with Gonzaga holding a 2–3 record in those matchups, but with conference realignment and the West Coast Conference's additions of BYU (2011) and Pacific (2013), the Zags have been more selective and limited in their scheduling with four less matchups in their non-conference schedule, so they have only played in the Spokane Arena once since 2012.

It also hosted the WIAA Class B state high school basketball tournament annually until 2006. The tournament came back to the arena in 2007, but as the Class 2B tournament. The WIAA had split the B classification into 1B and 2B. The Yakima SunDome in Yakima hosts the 1B tournament. The Class 1B tournament returned in 2011 when the WIAA changed the state tournament format.

Notably, this was the reason why the West Coast Conference men's basketball tournament had never been in Spokane before 2006; the Class B and WCC tournaments clash every year, and Gonzaga's on-campus arena at that time, the 4,000-seat Charlotte Y. Martin Centre, was too small to host the WCC tournament. In 2004, Gonzaga opened its new on-campus arena, the McCarthey Athletic Center, which enabled it to enter the rotation; the WCC tournament moved to the neutral Orleans Arena in Las Vegas in 2009.

===== NCAA Division I tournaments =====
Spokane Arena has been the site of several NCAA Division I basketball tournament games (men and women), with Washington State University as the designated host school. For the men, the arena hosted in the opening rounds in 2003, 2007, 2010, 2014, 2016, and 2024, the latter two of which were hosted by the University of Idaho for the first time. Before the arena's opening, the NCAA tournament was held in the region on the WSU campus in Pullman at Beasley Coliseum (1975, 1982, 1984).

The arena was a women's regional site in 2008, 2011, 2015, 2018, 2022 and 2025. The 2011 regional was notable for Gonzaga becoming the lowest-seeded team ever to reach a regional final in the women's tournament.

==== Bull riding ====
In 1999, the Professional Bull Riders (PBR) made a stop in Spokane Arena for a Bud Light Cup Series event in mid-April; it was one of six wins for Cody Hart in 1999, the same year he became a PBR World Champion.

==== Figure skating ====
In January 2007, the Spokane Arena was one of two facilities to host the 2007 U.S. Figure Skating Championships (the other being the Group Health Exhibit Hall at the Spokane Center several blocks away.) The arena, as well as the city, received many rave reviews and shattered the event's previous attendance record, previously held by Los Angeles, California, by over 30,000 attendees.

On May 5, 2008, it was announced that Spokane would once again host the U.S. Figure Skating Championships leading up to the 2010 Winter Olympics. Spokane Arena was the sole venue for the 2010 U.S. Figure Skating Championships. Held January 15–24, it broke its own attendance record, selling 158,170 tickets during the ten-day event.

Also, the Spokane Arena hosted the very first 2016 Team Challenge Cup, where athletes from North America, Europe, and Asia competed in teams. Team North America won the event.

==== Football ====
The Spokane Shock of the af2 and the Arena Football League played at the arena from 2006 until 2015. The Shock hosted ArenaBowl XXIII in 2010. The Shock then attempted to join the Indoor Football League in 2015, but the AFL withheld the franchise rights from the ownership. The owners then created the Spokane Empire and played in the IFL in 2016 and 2017 before ceasing operations. New ownership relaunched the Shock in 2020, but had its lease terminated by the city in February 2022.

==== Ice hockey ====
The Spokane Chiefs of the WHL play their home games at the arena. The 1998 Memorial Cup, hosted by the Chiefs, was played at the arena.

The arena hosted a National Hockey League preseason game between the Seattle Kraken and Vancouver Canucks on September 26, 2021. This is not the first time an NHL game has been played at the arena. In fact, the first event in the arena's history was a preseason game between the San Jose Sharks and Vancouver Canucks in 1995.

=== Wrestling ===
The arena hosted All Elite Wrestling's Title Tuesday event on October 8, 2024.

=== Concerts at Star Theatre ===
The Star Theatre is a 5,900-seat theater configuration used for theater concerts, Broadway, family shows, and other events. The configuration's eating capacity positions the "venue" between the seating capacities of the nearby First Interstate Center for the Arts and the full-theater seating of the Spokane Arena.

=== Notable events hosted ===
- 1995 – San Jose Sharks vs. Vancouver Canucks (National Hockey League exhibition game – September 17)
- 1995 - Gonzaga and Washington State played the Arena's first collegiate basketball game; WSU won 72–67 in overtime – November 24.
- 1996 – Wrangler Pro Rodeo Classic
  - United States Olympic Wrestling Trials
- 1997 - Western Hockey League All-Star Game
  - NCAA Volleyball Final Four
- 1998 – Stars on Ice
  - Memorial Cup
- 2002 – Skate America figure skating competition
- 2003 – NCAA men's basketball tournament
  - WWE SmackDown!
- 2004 – Kid Rock Rock N' Roll Pain Train Tour
- 2005 – Destiny's Child Destiny Fulfilled... and Lovin' It
- 2007 – NCAA men's basketball tournament
  - Beyoncé The Beyoncé Experience
- 2009 – Taylor Swift Fearless Tour
- 2010 – U.S. Figure Skating Championships
  - NCAA Basketball Tournament
  - ArenaBowl XXIII
  - PBR Classic
  - NCAA Women's Basketball Regionals
- 2013 – NCAA women's basketball regionals
- 2014 – NCAA men's basketball tournament
- 2015 – NCAA women's basketball regionals
- 2016 – NCAA men's basketball tournament
  - Kellogg's Tour of Gymnastics Champions
- 2021 – Seattle Kraken vs. Vancouver Canucks (National Hockey League exhibition game – September 26)
- 2022 – Paul McCartney first concert of Got Back Tour
- 2022 – Korn with Evanescence played the arena during a summer tour
- 2023 – Shania Twain first concert of Queen of Me Tour
- 2024 – NCAA Men's Basketball Tournament
- 2025 – NCAA Women's Basketball Tournament Regionals

== Adjacent venues ==
- One Spokane Stadium (2023)
- The Podium (2021)

Events and tenants
Preceded by Spokane Coliseum	Home of the Spokane Chiefs; 1995 – present	Succeeded by Current
Preceded by New Orleans Arena	Host of the ArenaBowl; ArenaBowl XXIII	Succeeded by US Airways Center
