= Spokane Black Widows =

- Full name: Spokane Black Widows Soccer Club
- Founded: 2010
- Ground: Joe Albi Stadium; Spokane, Washington
- Capacity: 28,646
- Owner: Al Brown
- Head Coach: (United States) Jason Quintero
- League: Women's Premier Soccer League
Home colors	Away colors

Spokane Black Widows were an American soccer team based in Spokane, Washington, United States. Founded in 2010, the team played in the Women's Premier Soccer League (WPSL), the second tier of the American Soccer Pyramid, in the North Division of the Pacific Conference.

The team played its home games at Joe Albi Stadium. The team's colors were blue, black and white.

== Players ==
=== WPSL Honorable Mention for Player of the Week ===
- (United States) Tiara Pittman 6/21/10
- (United States) Kellie Zakrzewski 6/28/10

== Year-by-year ==
Year	Division	League	Regular season	Playoffs
2010	2	WPSL	3rd, Pacific-North	

=== Pacific Conference - North Division ===
Place	Team	P	W	L	T	GF	GA	GD	Points
1	California Storm	12	11	1	0	38	9	+29	33
2	North Bay FC Wave	12	9	3	0	28	9	+19	27
3	Spokane Black Widows	12	6	5	1	23	19	+4	19
4	BSC Portland Rain	12	6	6	0	25	16	+9	18
5	Clovis Sidekicks	12	6	6	0	37	32	+5	18
6	San Francisco Nighthawks	12	3	8	1	23	28	-5	10
7	FC Sacramento Pride	12	0	12	0	5	66	-61	0

== Head coaches ==
- (United States) Jason Quintero (2010)

== Stadia ==
- Joe Albi Stadium; Spokane, Washington (2010)

== Average attendance ==
Year	Attendance	Notes
2010		
All Time		
