= Spokane Public Facilities District =

Government body in Spokane, Washington

Aerial view of downtown Spokane that has a number of Spokane Public Facilities District structures in view, including the Spokane Arena, The Podium, ONE Spokane Stadium and in the distance the Spokane Convention Center.

The Spokane Public Facilities District (SPFD) is the government body in Spokane, Washington that manages the Spokane Arena, Spokane Convention Center, the First Interstate Center for the Arts, The Podium, and One Spokane Stadium. It was created in 1989 by the Washington State Legislature to create a plan to replace the old Spokane Coliseum. The Coliseum was eventually replaced by the Spokane Arena.

== District History ==
After several attempts to replace the Spokane Coliseum, the Spokane Public Facilities District was created in 1989 by the Washington State Legislature by virtue of RCW 36.100. The Legislature appropriated $500,000 to the District to commence operations.

The District is a municipal corporation. It is an independent taxing authority and a taxing district as defined in the state Constitution. The boundaries are coextensive with the boundaries of Spokane County. As defined by the Legislature, the SPFD was authorized to "acquire, construct, own and operate sports and entertainment facilities with contiguous parking facilities." It has a five person Board of Directors. Two directors are appointed by the City of Spokane, two are appointed by Spokane County, and one is appointed by the other directors.

== Facilities ==
The District manages and maintains the Spokane Arena, Spokane Convention Center, the First Interstate Center for the Arts, The Podium, and ONE Spokane Stadium.

=== Spokane Veterans Memorial Arena ===
In the spring of 1990, the District Board published a Request for Qualifications (RFQ) for an economic feasibility/market analysis. Laventhol & Horwath (now Price Waterhouse) was hired to help determine the type, size and location of a new facility to replace the Coliseum. David Petersen of L & H conducted over 40 interviews with local area elected officials, user groups, citizens and promoters as part of this study. Nine sites were evaluated for possible location of a new facility.

The Board subsequently voted unanimously to accept the recommendations of the Laventhol & Horwath study, as follows:

Type: An arena was chosen over a domed stadium.
Size: 12,000 to 14,000 with the capability for future expansion.
Location: On City-owned land east of the Coliseum, with on-site parking for 2,000 automobiles.

A ballot proposition was placed on the County general election ballot in November 1990 with two issues: (1) a property tax bond issue of $38 million to finance construction; and (2) a measure to validate the District, which would allow it to impose a two percent hotel/motel room tax on properties of 40 or more units. The second measure passed while the first failed to get the super majority needed for approval.

In December 1990 the City of Spokane and Spokane County each issued $15.4 million in bonds to preserve tax-exempt status. This was the basis of the first Interlocal Cooperation Agreement among the District, City and County. Over that winter the Board again met with local elected officials and community leaders to discuss the concept of a one-tenth of one percent sales tax measure. Local area legislators (primarily Senator Jim West and Representative Bill Day) worked to obtain legislative support of a bill to allow the District to seek voter approval of such a measure. The one-tenth of one percent sales tax measure was placed on the primary election ballot in September 1991 and received the approval of Spokane County voters, thus completing the financing needed to construct the Arena. The ballot proposition specified the cost of the facility at $44.8 million and stated that all funds would be used for the Arena project. Both taxes were imposed on January 1, 1992.

Ceremonial groundbreaking occurred on March 5, 1993.

The Arena opened in September 1995 and has been a remarkable success for the community. Since opening its doors, the Arena has sold millions of tickets and hosted a variety of events including 5 sold-out Garth Brooks concerts, Elton John, Nickelback, Brad Paisley, Carrie Underwood, numerous Men's and Women's NCAA Basketball Championship events, the record-breaking 2007 and 2010 US Figure Skating Championships, Walking with Dinosaurs, and Star Wars: In Concert, amongst others.

In April 2012, the District went back to voters with a ballot measure to extend the two percent hotel/motel room tax, providing the District with the financing to add additional space to the Spokane Convention Center, complete work on the Spokane Riverbank, and upgrade the seating structures in the Arena.

=== Spokane Convention Center ===
In August 2002, the Board revised the District's Mission Statement to include other projects, as the original PFD was created for the construction of the Spokane Veterans Memorial Arena only. Following a report issued by the Facilities 2000 Working Group they recommended that the PFD take on other projects due to the successful operation of the Arena. There are three main projects:

- The expansion of the existing convention center (CCX)
- The Fair and Expo Center Grandstand
- CenterPlace at Mirabeau Point

The 5-member Board began their due diligence to determine if it was fiscally feasible. On May 21, 2002, Spokane County voters overwhelmingly authorized the Regional Projects including a significant expansion of the Spokane Convention Center and the new projects at both the Fair and Expo Center and at Mirabeau Point.

The Board determined that the site for Convention Center Expansion (CCX) must be adjacent to and attached to the existing Convention Center and Ag Trade Center. Sites to both the east and to the south were evaluated. Geotechnical work on both sites was completed and both sites could accommodate a 100,000 sq.ft exhibit hall, new lobby and loading areas, covered connections between the facilities and on-site parking. The District completed the site selection process for the CCX project and in August 2003 approved the purchase of the property to the east of the existing facility and property on the block to the south. The 100,000 square-foot Exhibit Hall was located on the East site.

On September 2, 2003 the management of the Spokane Opera House, now the First Interstate Center for the Arts, and Convention Center was transferred to the Spokane Public Facilities District. There was a special "Passing of the Keys" ceremony involving representatives for the PFD and the City of Spokane. After consideration of every management alternative, the District hired a core group of employees to operate and manage all the facilities and will continue to rely heavily on contract services for many of the day-to-day operational tasks.

The official groundbreaking ceremony for the Convention Center Expansion took place on July 1, 2004. The expansion was completed ahead of schedule and a dedication ceremony occurred on July 19, 2006. A public open house was held the following day and well attended. The portion of the CC that was constructed for the 1974 Worlds Fair was completely remodeled and opened on time and on budget in May 2007. The CCX was awarded LEED Silver Certification in 2007 by the US Green Building Council, making it just the third convention center structure in the country to be awarded with such a distinction. As of 2010, the previously existing Convention Center facility was awarded LEED Silver Certification for existing buildings.

In April 2012, the District went back to voters with a ballot measure to extend the two percent hotel/motel room tax, providing the District with the financing to add additional space to the Spokane Convention Center, complete work on the Spokane Riverbank, and upgrade the seating structures in the Arena.

=== First Interstate Center for the Arts ===
Constructed for Expo '74, the First Interstate Center for the Arts is home to WestCoast Entertainment's Annual "Best of Broadway" Series and many iconic performances by legendary artists and family shows.

Immediately following completion of the CC expansion and remodel, the District began a series of project at the First Interstate Center for the Arts. Since 2003 the District has invested heavily in the INB in projects that include: new seats, a rigging system upgrade, a new sound system, new chillers, paint, carpet, new elevators, new marquee, and all new site work.

In 2010, the First Interstate Center for the Arts was awarded LEED Silver Certification for existing buildings by the US Green Building Council.

=== The Podium ===
Officially named, The Podium Powered by STCU, the venue is a 135,000-square-foot (12,500 m^{2}) indoor multi-use sports facility that opened in December 2021. The main competition space includes a 6-lane, 200-meter hydraulically banked indoor track, and can also accommodate 16 volleyball courts, 9 basketball courts, 21 wrestling mats, and other multi-sport layouts.

=== ONE Spokane Stadium ===
In partnership with the owner, Spokane Public Schools (SPS), the 5,000 seat stadium opened in September 2023 and is directly north of The Podium. The venue hosts SPS high school football and soccer. The stadium will also host three United Soccer League (USL) teams: a professional women's USL Super League team, a professional men's USL League One team, and a pre-professional USL W League team. All three teams are expected to start in 2024.
