= Spokane Convention Center =

- Location of the convention center within Downtown Spokane
- Former names: Spokane Convention Center and International Agricultural Trade Center (1989–2006); Spokane Convention Center (1974–1989); Washington State Pavilion (Expo 1974)
- Address: 334 West Spokane Falls Blvd.
- Location: Spokane, Washington, U.S.
- Coordinates: 47.661°N 117.413°W
- Owner: Spokane Public Facilities District
- Public transit: Spokane Transit Authority
- Parking: 700 spaces (on-site)

Convention use
- Total space: 500,000 sq ft (46,500 m^{2})
- Exhibit hall floor: 120,000 sq ft (11,100 m^{2})
- Breakout/meeting space: 33,080 sq ft (3,070 m^{2})
- Ballroom space: 50,750 sq ft (4,710 m^{2})

Construction
- Built: 1972–1974
- Opened: May 1974, 52 years ago
- Renovated: 2007
- Expanded: 1987–89, 2004–06, 2013–15
- Cost: $10.8 million (original) $8 million (1987 expansion) $77 million (2004 expansion) $41 million (2013 expansion)

Website
- spokanecenter.com

Spokane Convention Center is the primary convention center in Spokane, Washington, in the northwest United States, and consists of two interconnected buildings along the south bank of the Spokane River in downtown Spokane. The facility, owned and operated by the Spokane Public Facilities District, is part of a larger campus, historically referred to as Spokane Center, that also contains the adjacent First Interstate Center for the Arts which is connected to the Davenport Grand hotel across the street via a skywalk.

== History ==
=== Original use as Washington State Pavilion during Expo `74 ===
Designed by the Spokane-based architecture firm, Walker, McGough, Foltz & Lyerla, the original part of the convention center was constructed from 1972 to 1974 as a part of a single auditorium-convention center building that would serve as the Washington State Pavilion for Spokane's Expo '74. The 117,000-square-foot (10,900 m^{2}) pavilion consisted of two components: a 40,000-square-foot (3,700 m^{2}) exhibit hall on the east side of the building and a 2,700-seat opera house on the west side. These programmatic elements were strategically located in this fashion to allow for future expansion of the exhibit hall onto vacant land to the east and north of pavilion once it became a convention center.

=== Spokane Convention Center ===
The exhibit hall component was converted into a convention center after fair ended and the opera house portion of the facility became Spokane Opera House (now known as the First Interstate Center for the Arts). The architecture firm that originally designed the Washington State Pavilion was retained to design the $2 million conversion of the exhibit hall space into a convention center. Over the course of its history, the Spokane Convention Center has had two major expansions, with a third set to break ground in July 2013.

=== 1980s Ag Trade Center addition ===
The $9.8 million Washington State International Agricultural Trade Center addition broke ground in 1987 and was opened on January 17, 1989. The facility was constructed as a seamless addition to the north side of the existing convention center and featured a 270-seat conference theater, 13 meeting rooms on two levels, an additional exhibition/banquet hall, and a rooftop patio above the theater.

=== 2000s – present: continued growth ===
==== 2004 – 2006 expansion: a new exhibition hall ====
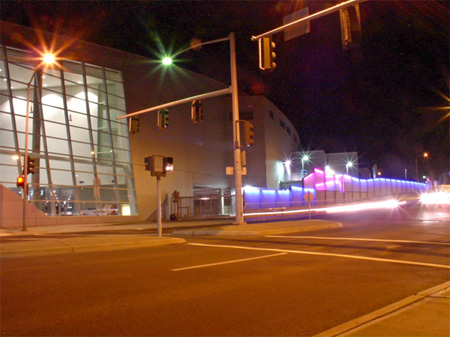
The Group Health Exhibit Hall opened in 2006.

In the early 2000s, the Spokane Public Facilities District, which had originally been created in the late 1980s to oversee the development of the nearby Spokane Veterans Memorial Arena (a building that was completed in 1995) was tasked to take on a major expansion of the Spokane Convention Center along with the development of other public venues around the Spokane area. In May 2002, Spokane County voters approved a ballot measure that enabled the design and construction of a 100,000 square feet (9,300 m^{2}) exhibition hall addition to the convention center. Because of land constraints, a hall of that size (which would more than double the square footage of the existing convention center) would have to be built non-contiguously with the existing building and connected with an interior walkway, unlike the seamless addition of the prior Ag Trade Center expansion. By August 2003, the east site was selected as the home for the new exhibit halls and on September 2, 2003, the ownership and management of the Spokane Convention Center (along with the opera house) was transferred from the City of Spokane to the Spokane Public Facilities District.

Construction on the new Group Health Exhibit Hall began in 2004 and was completed in the summer of 2006, several months ahead of the 2007 United States Figure Skating Championships, in which it was a venue, along with the Spokane Arena. The building was designed in part to host that event, which required a hall with a column-free layout for a temporary ice rink to be set up in. The exhibit hall is connected to the older portions of the convention center via an elevated walkway that runs along the banks of the Spokane River. After the completion of the new exhibit hall the Public Facilities District began a renovation project (that was completed the following spring) of the older portions of the convention center which included the conversion of the old exhibition spaces into ballrooms. The new exhibition hall has enabled Spokane to compete at a larger stage for convention business and has helped bring in events such as the USA Volleyball Pacific Northwest Qualifier on several occasions that wouldn't have been possible without the expansion.

==== 2013 – 2015 expansion ====
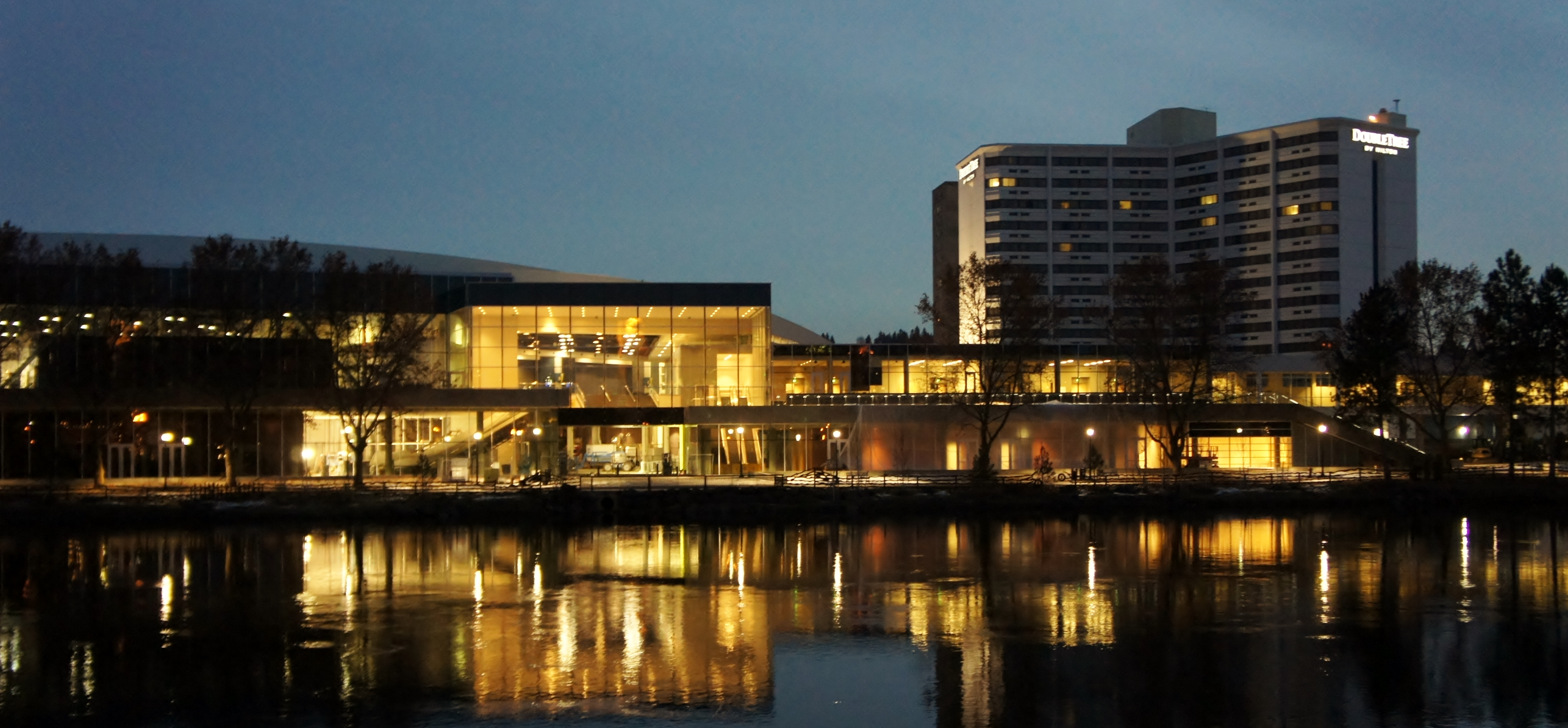
The exterior and interior of the exhibition hall

In 2012, voters approved another ballot measure to allow an additional expansion to the convention center. The $41 million expansion broke ground in July 2013 and provided a seamless addition to the north side of the Group Health Exhibit Hall and included expanding the exhibition space, adding more meeting rooms, and improving the Centennial Trail that runs adjacent to the convention center along the river. The 90,000 square feet (8,400 m^{2}) addition opened in February 2015.

==== 2026 use as wildfire evacuation center ====
The convention center was a shelter for people evacuated during the 2026 Old Trails Fire.

== Facilities ==
Exhibit Hall

The "Exhibit Halls" are the main facility at the convention center. The space consists of 120,000 square feet (11,000 m^{2}) and can be subdivided into six separate areas. The space is primarily used for trade shows, conventions, and sporting events.

Ballrooms

Spokane Convention Center has three ballroom facilities, totaling 50,700 square feet (4,710 m^{2}). The "Grand Ballroom" is the largest ballroom in Spokane and the convention center and holds 1,630 guests for catered events and up to 2,700 for general admission. The space was the original exhibit hall for the convention center, but was renovated into its present-day use as a ballroom following the opening of the new exhibit hall building 2006. The "Junior Ballroom" seats up to 1,475 guests in a reception format. A third ballroom, the "Centennial" was added as part of the convention center's expansion from 2013 to 2015, and can hold up to 1,500 guests in a reception seating format.

Meeting Rooms

The convention center has 33,080 square feet (3,073 m^{2}) of meeting room space consisting of 14 rooms, which can be further subdivided into 30 total spaces. It also has an 805 square feet (74.8 m^{2}) boardroom.

Outdoor Spaces

Despite being in a downtown urban area, the Spokane Convention Center has 27,600 square feet (2,560 m^{2}) of roof terraces and lawns as outdoor event space.

== Transportation ==
Spokane Convention Center is served by Spokane Transit Authority and can be accessed directly through STA route 25 and is within one block of stops for routes 1, 26, 27, 28, and 39.
