= Northwest, Spokane =

Northwest
- Spokane Neighborhood
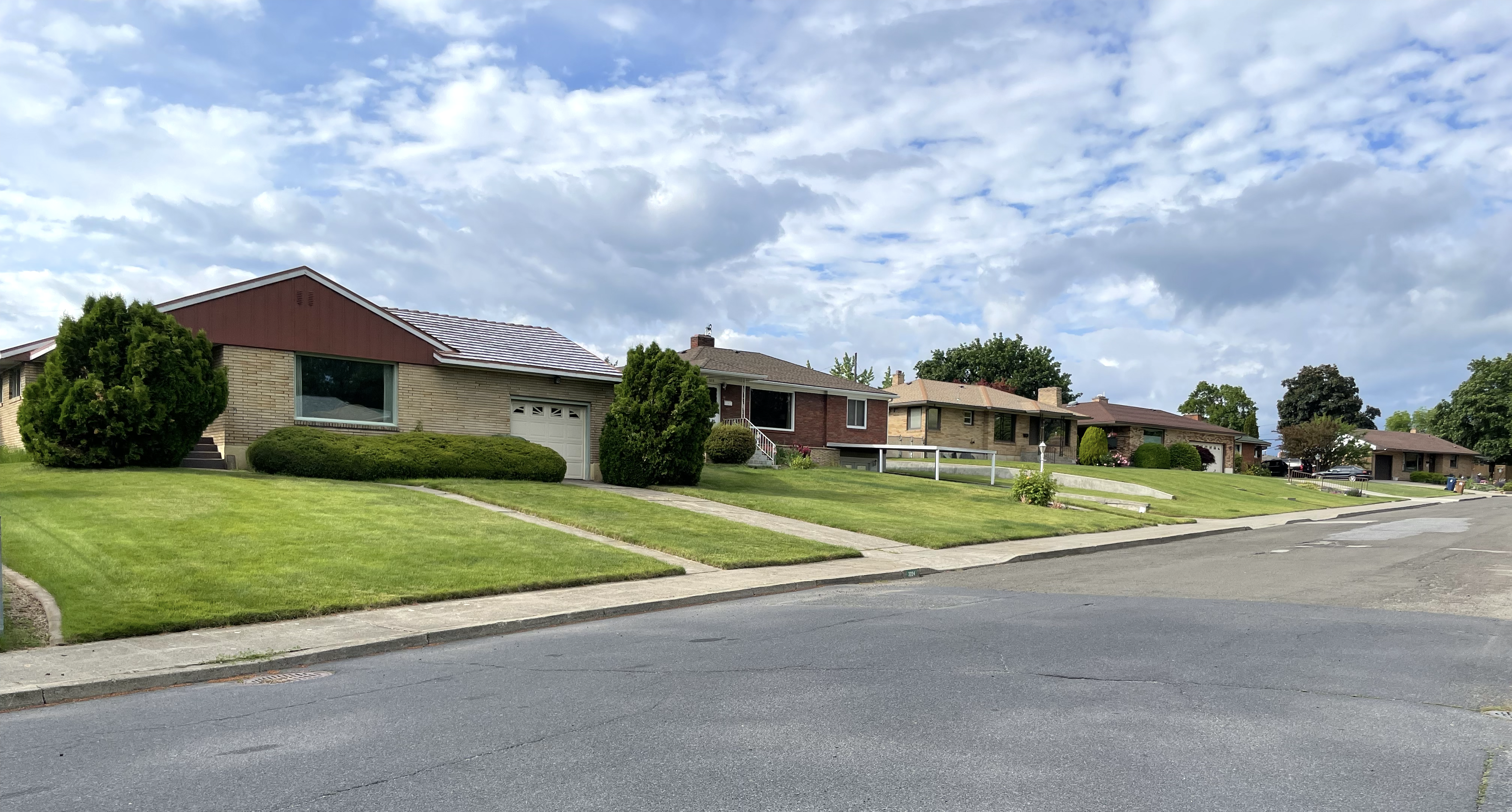
- Residential street scene in Northwest

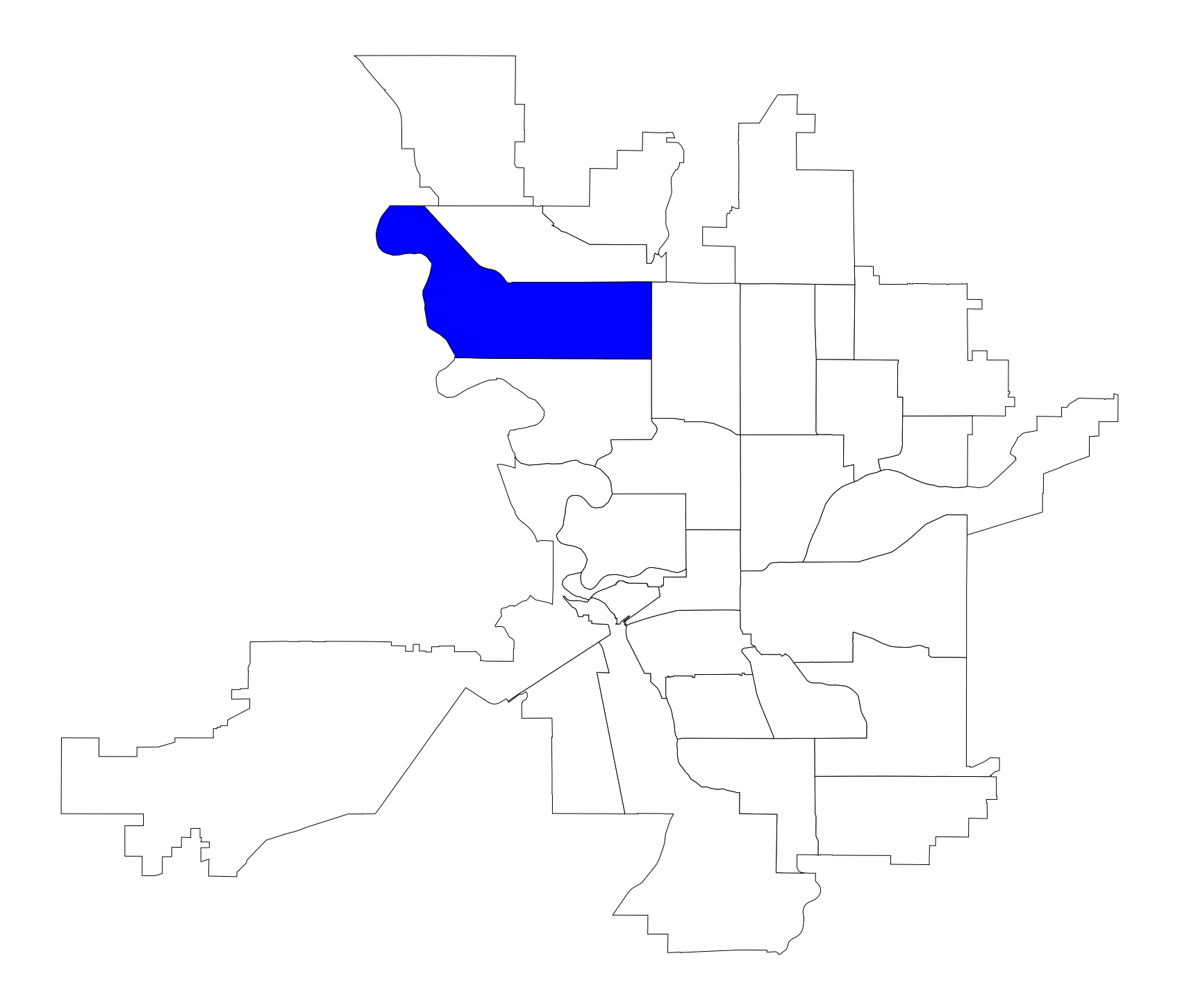
- Location of Northwest in Spokane
- Coordinates: 47°42′30″N 117°27′46″W
- Country: United States
- State: Washington
- County: Spokane
- City: Spokane

Population (2017)
  - Total: 13,367

Demographics 2017
  - White: 89.9%
  - Latinx: 4.6%
  - Asian/Native Hawaiian/Pacific Islander: 1.6%
  - American Indian/Alaska Native: 1.5%
  - Black: 1.4%
- Time zone: UTC-8 (PST)
  - Summer (DST): UTC-7 (PDT)
- ZIP Codes: 99205, 99208
- Area code: 509

Northwest is a neighborhood in Spokane, Washington, located in the northwestern portion of the city. Largely single-family residential, Northwest is also home to Spokane's VA Medical Center, the Dwight Merkel Sports complex, a large public sports facility, and portions of Riverside State Park along the Spokane River. The neighborhood contains developments that span from the post-World War II housing boom in the east to more contemporary, suburban-style developments in the west. It was also home to Joe Albi Stadium from 1950 until 2022, which served as the Spokane region's main high school sports stadium over its seven decades of use.

== History ==
The Spokane people have lived in what is now Northwest for hundreds of years. They camped and fished along the banks of the Spokane River and gathered edible plants, roots and berries which grew throughout the neighborhood. A trail which gave its name to the South Indian Trail and North Indian Trail neighborhoods to the north passed through the area, connecting the Spokane Falls to the southeast with the Little Spokane River to the north.

With the arrival of European settlers in the 1800s, the trail became an important arterial for the trappers and pioneers who came to the Spokane area. The trail was renamed Pioneer Road and was part of a route that connected the Columbia River to Spokane House, roughly 7.5 miles to the northwest of the current neighborhood. From Spokane House, the trail and subsequent Pioneer Road passed through what is now Northwest into the nascent city of Spokane.

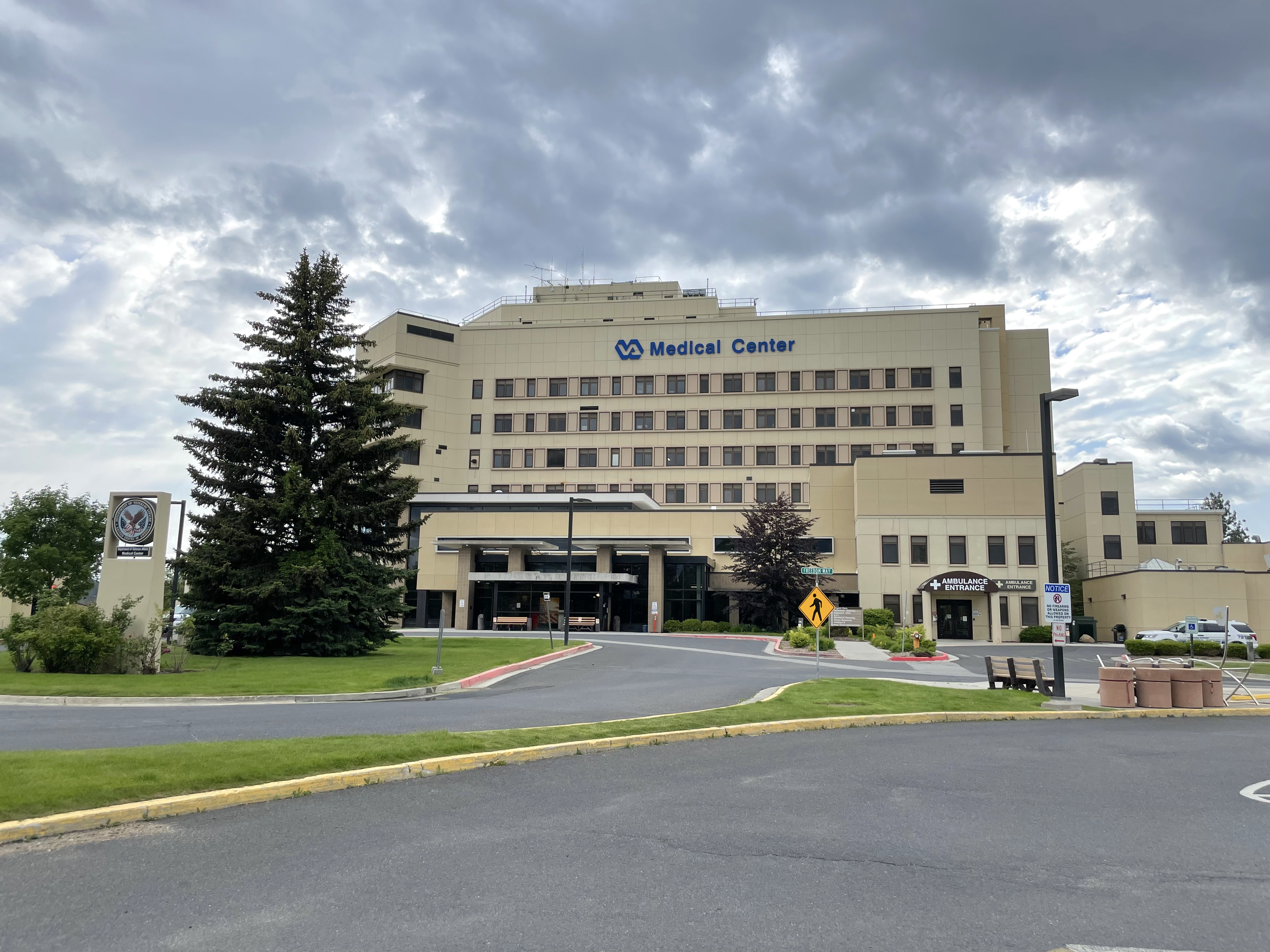
Spokane VA Medical Center in Northwest

The bulk of Northwest was annexed into the city of Spokane between 1907 and 1910. By 1923, towards the end of Spokane's streetcar era, a streetcar line stretched into Northwest along Driscoll Boulevard to near Rowan Avenue.

Growth in the neighborhood took off in the 1940s. During World War II the U.S. Army built Baxter General Hospital on the grounds of what is now the VA Medical Center. In the post-war housing boom that followed, residential development spread across the north side of Spokane, including in the Northwest neighborhood. Joe Albi Stadium, originally named Memorial Stadium, was opened to the west of the VA Medical Center in 1950. The stadium served as the city's municipal stadium for 70 years.

The neighborhood expanded in 1986 by annexing a tract of land to the northwest of the former border at Francis and again in 2006 by annexing the eastern banks of the Spokane River.

== Geography ==
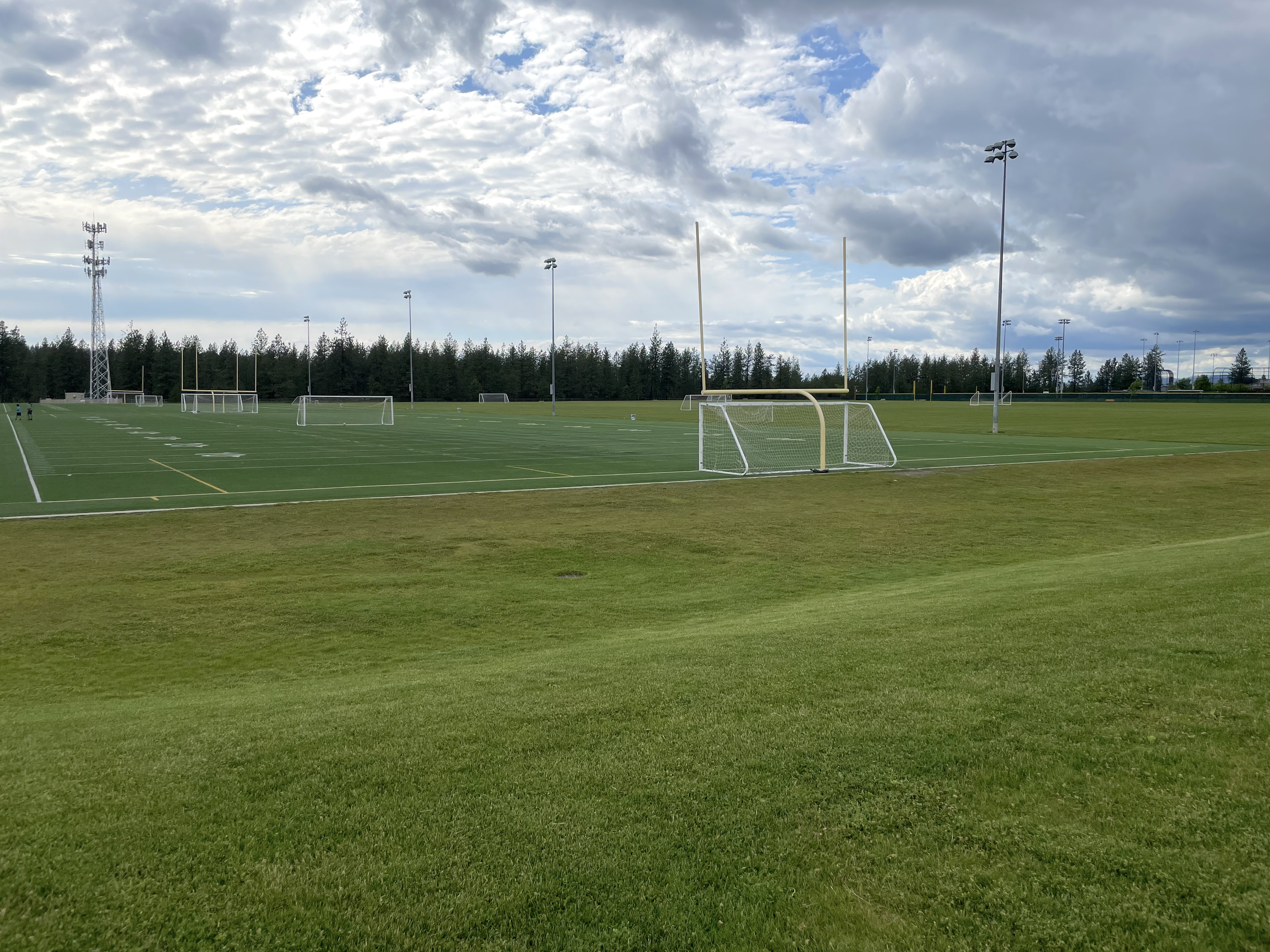
Dwight Merkel Sports Complex

As the name suggests, Northwest is located in the northwestern portion of Spokane. It is bounded by the Spokane River on the west, Wellesley Avenue on the South, Ash Street on the east and Francis Avenue and Nine Mile Road in the north. The Balboa/South Indian Trail lies to the north. North Hill is located to the east. Audubon/Downriver is located to the south. Unincorporated Spokane County sits to the west, beyond the Spokane River; The Spokane River and portions of Riverside State Park are located within the neighborhood, but extend north, south and west from the neighborhood.

The eastern half of Northwest is largely flat, especially west of A Street. There is a hillside that runs southeast–northwest along Driscoll Boulevard that climbs approximately 100 feet over two to three city blocks. Another, steeper bluff falls more than 100 feet just northwest of the intersection of Francis and Nine Mile Road, where the northwesternmost portion of the neighborhood lies closer to the elevation of the Spokane River. The western, flat portions of the neighborhood are around 2,000 feet above sea level while the river on the western edge is around 1,600 feet.

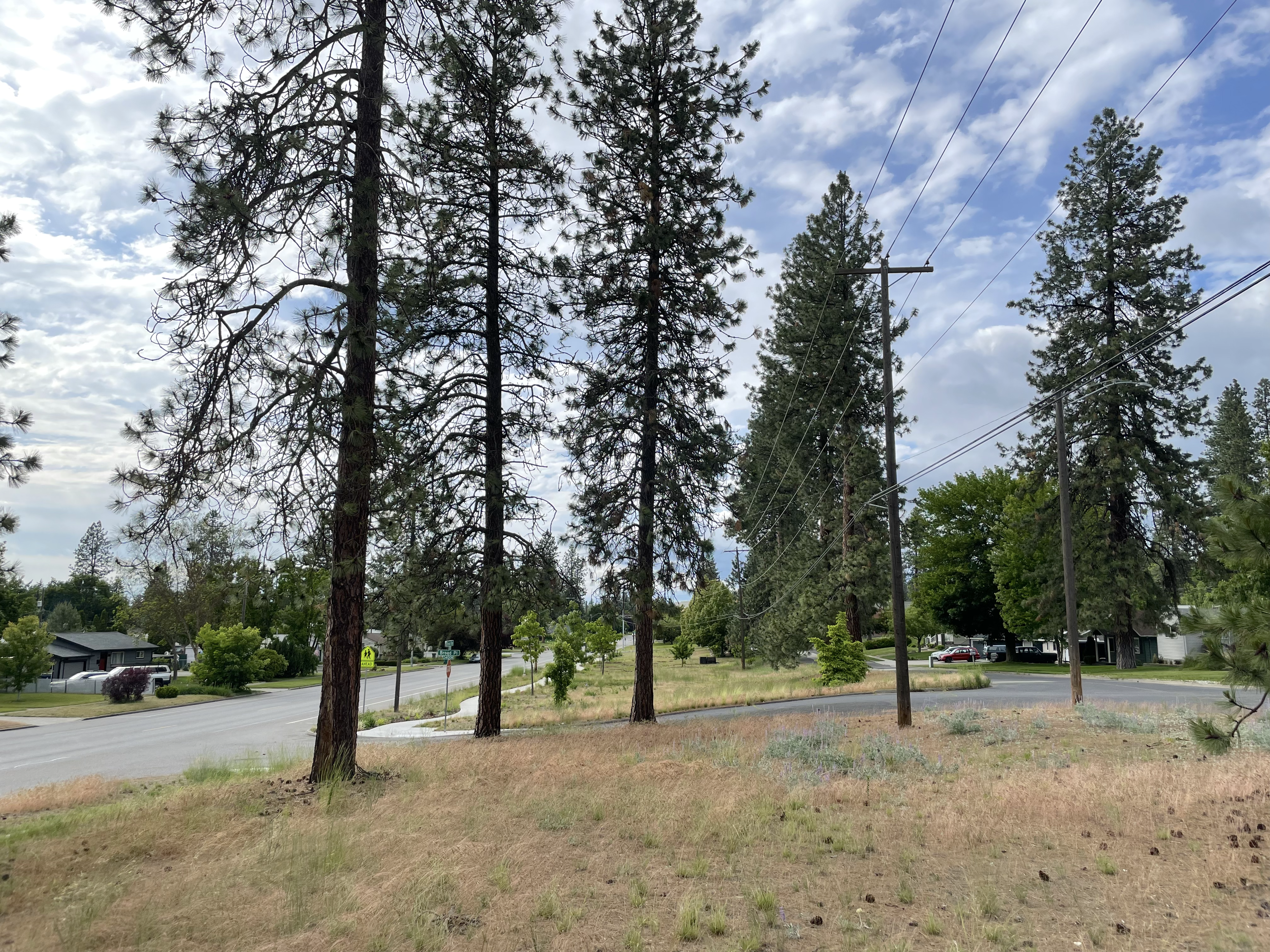
Driscoll Boulevard Parkway

Riverside State Park extends into Northwest along its western boundary on the Spokane River. The parkland here protects some of the last intact Okanagan dry forests ecoregion, part of the broader temperate coniferous forest biome. The Okanagan dry forests extend from just south of Spokane northwest through the Okanagan to the Thompson Plateau in British Columbia. Tall ponderosa pine trees in the neighborhood are remnants of the ecoregion's presence prior to human development.

Assembly Street runs north–south through the middle of the neighborhood. To the east are largely single-family residential zones with a few neighborhood retail areas. To the west of Assembly are the campuses of the VA Medical Center, Dwight Merkel Sports Complex, Pauline Flett Middle School and Fairmount Memorial Park, as well as the portions of Riverside State Park within the neighborhood. There is also an area of suburban development in the northwest of the neighborhood to the west of Nine Mile Road made up of multiple subdivision style developments.

== Demographics ==
As of 2017, there were 13,367 residents in the neighborhood across 5,513 households, of which 28.2% had children. 22.8% of households were rented, compared to 45.3% citywide. 24.6% of the residents were aged 19 or younger, compared to 21.9% citywide. Those over 65 made up 23.5% of the population, compared to 14.5% citywide. The median household income was $55,709, compared to $44,768 citywide. 23.2% of the population has a bachelor's degree or higher, while 27.5% have at most a high school diploma. The unemployment rate was 5.6% compared to 6.5% citywide. 51.8% of students qualify for free or reduced lunch, compared to 54.5% citywide. 96.4% of residents were born in the United States or one of its territories. Of those born elsewhere, 24.3% were from Germany, 15.1% from Ireland, with 20.8% from "other" and 20.3% from "unclassified."

== Education ==
Northwest is served by Spokane Public Schools, and is home to Westview Elementary and Browne Elementary Schools. Those two schools, as well as Indian Trail Elementary in neighboring Balboa/South Indian Trail and Ridgeview in neighboring North Hill, serve Northwest. Westview Elementary serves Northwest from Francis Avenue in the north to Rowan Avenue in the south, and Assembly Street in the west to Belt Street in the east. Browne Elementary serves the neighborhood south of Rowan Avenue and west of Belt Street. Indian Trail Elementary serves the northwestern portion of the neighborhood along Nine Mile Road and Ridgeview Elementary serves Northwest east of Belt Street. All four schools feed into Pauline Flett Middle School. located in the Northwest neighborhood. From Pauline Flett Middle School, all four elementary districts also feed into Shadle Park High School, located just south of Northwest in the adjacent Audubon/Downriver neighborhood.

== Transportation ==
=== Highway ===
- State Route 291 - to Tumtum (north) and Spokane (south)

State Route 291 passes east–west as the northern boundary of Northwest along Francis Avenue and then as Nine Mile Road; it connects to U.S. Route 2 and U.S. Route 395 at its southern terminus at Division Street in the neighboring North Hill neighborhood to the east.

=== Surface streets ===
The easternmost portions of Northwest are aligned to the city's street grid, though it breaks down as one moves west and the terrain becomes less flat. East of Assembly Street, even where the streets do not follow the grid pattern they do connect with one another. West of Assembly, however, streets take on more of a suburban pattern with winding roads, cul-de-sacs, and non-connecting roads common.

Ash, Assembly, Francis, Nine Mile and Wellesley are classified by the city as principal arterials, the city's top classification for a surface street. Alberta, Driscoll and Rowan are classified as minor arterials by the city. The Aubrey L. White Parkway, passing through Riverside State Park and paralleling the Spokane River, as well as A and Belt Streets, are classified as major collectors by the city. The rest of the streets in Northwest are classified as local-access roadways.

Dedicated bike lanes run along Assembly, Driscoll and Rowan, while shared-roadway bike routes run along A, Belt and Bismark Streets and Nine Mile Road. A non-motorized path connects Northwest to Riverside State Park to the Dwight Merkel Sports Complex in the northwest of the neighborhood.

=== Public transit ===
Northwest is served by the Spokane Transit Authority, like the rest of the Spokane metropolitan area, with three fixed-route bus lines passing through the neighborhood.

Route	Termini			Service operation and notes	Streets traveled
33; Wellesley	West Hills; Spokane Falls Community College	↔	Chief Garry Park; Spokane Community College	High-frequency route	Wellesley
22; Northwest Boulevard	Downtown Spokane; STA Plaza	↔	Balboa/South Indian Trail; Five Mile Park & Ride	Basic-frequency route	Wellesley, Assembly, Rowan, G, Francis
23; Maple/Ash	Downtown Spokane; STA Plaza	↔	North Indian Trail; Meadowglen Park	Basic-frequency route	Maple/Ash couplet, Rowan, Alberta, Francis,
