= First Interstate Center for the Arts =

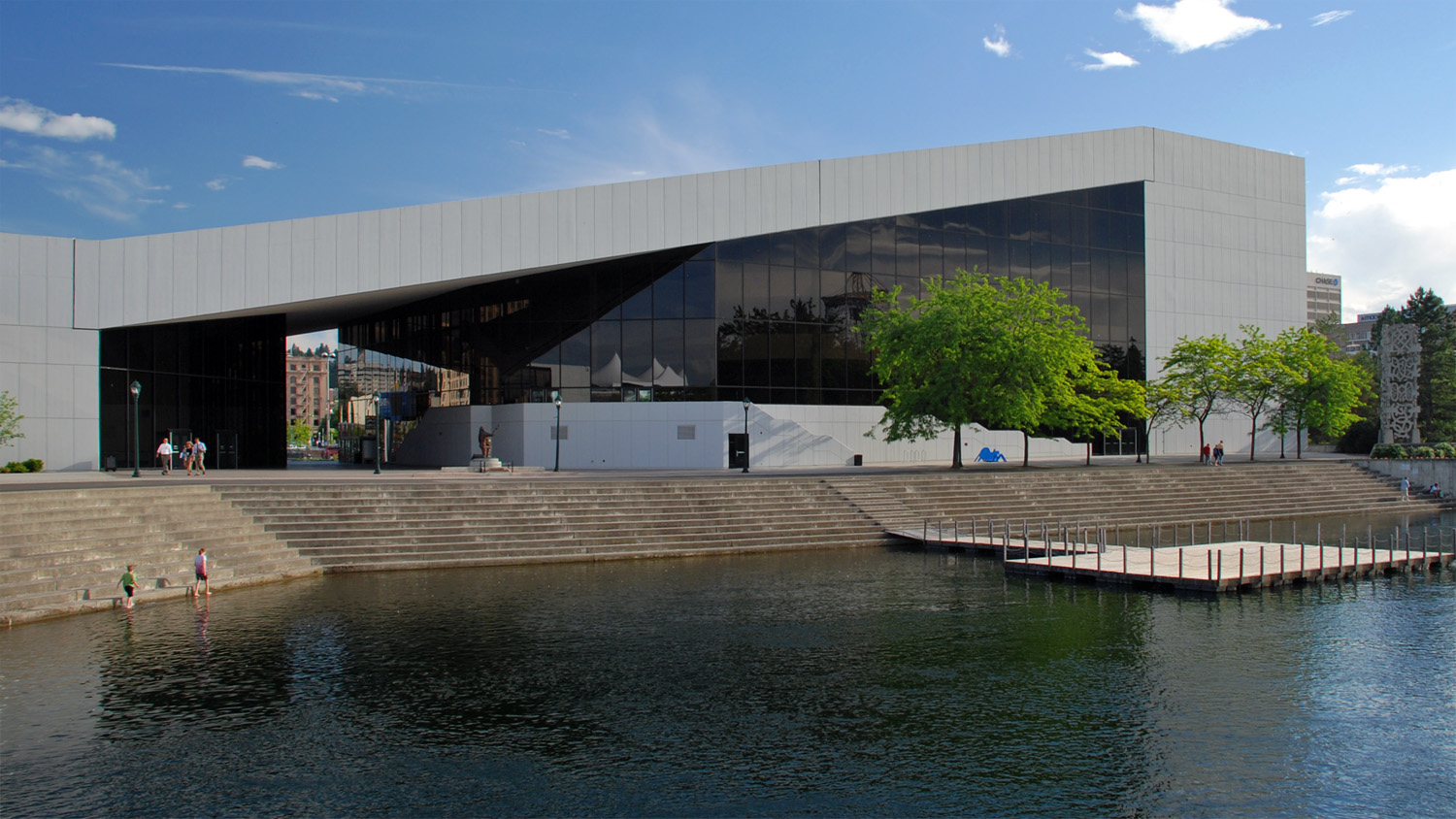
- Exterior view of the First Interstate Center for the Arts from Riverfront Park (c.2011)
- Interactive map of First Interstate Center for the Arts
- Former names: Washington State Pavilion Opera House (1974); Spokane Opera House (1974-2006); INB Performing Arts Center (2006-18)
- Address: 334 W Spokane Falls Blvd; Spokane, WA 99201-0212
- Location: Riverside
- Coordinates: 47.660600°N 117.417165°W
- Owner: Spokane Public Facilities District
- Capacity: 2,609

Construction
- Opened: May 1, 1974
- Renovated: Late 2000s - Early 2010s; 2018
- Cost: US$10.8 million ($83.1 million in 2025 dollars)

Website
- Venue Website

The First Interstate Center for the Arts is a 2,609-seat theater and entertainment venue in Spokane, Washington. It is located in Downtown Spokane along the south bank of the Spokane River adjacent to the Spokane Convention Center. The facility is owned and operated by the Spokane Public Facilities District.

== History ==
After two years of construction from 1972-1974 for the Expo '74 in Spokane, the venue officially opened as the Washington State Pavilion Opera House on May 1, 1974. A gala took place to celebrate the grand opening of the opera house which included performances by Roberta Peters of the Metropolitan Opera, New York City Ballet's Edward Villella, and Lucette Aldous.

=== Transfer of ownership to Spokane ===
After the world's fair ended, operations and management of the facility along with the Spokane Convention Center were transferred to the City of Spokane, with the plan that the city would eventually take ownership of the building from the State of Washington. The legislative bill to transfer the ownership to the city was signed on April 20, 1979 in a special ceremony in front of the Opera House with then-Washington State Governor Dixy Lee Ray, although the actual legal transfer of the property would not take place until 90 days after the current state legislative session ended.

=== Spokane Public Facilities District era ===
The facility was owned and operated by the City of Spokane until September 2, 2003 when it transferred both the ownership and operations of the Spokane Opera House along with the Spokane Convention Center to the Spokane Public Facilities District. In 2006, Spokane-based Inland Northwest Bank purchased the naming rights to the Spokane Opera House in a 10-year, $1.5 million deal and the facility was renamed to the INB Performing Arts Center. In December 2015, it was announced that INB's naming rights deal was renewed for an additional 10 year period. On September 19, 2018, the facility was renamed the First Interstate Center for the Arts after First Interstate BancSystem, which had completed its acquisition of Northwest Bancorporation, Inc., the parent company of Inland Northwest Bank, a month prior on August 16, 2018. At the time of closing, First Interstate announced plans to phase out the Inland Northwest Bank name in November 2018.
