= Spokane–Coeur d'Alene combined statistical area =

Coordinates: 47.6721°N 117.0120°W

Spokane–Coeur d'Alene Combined Statistical Area
- Combined Statistical Area
- Spokane–Spokane Valley–Coeur d'Alene, WA–ID
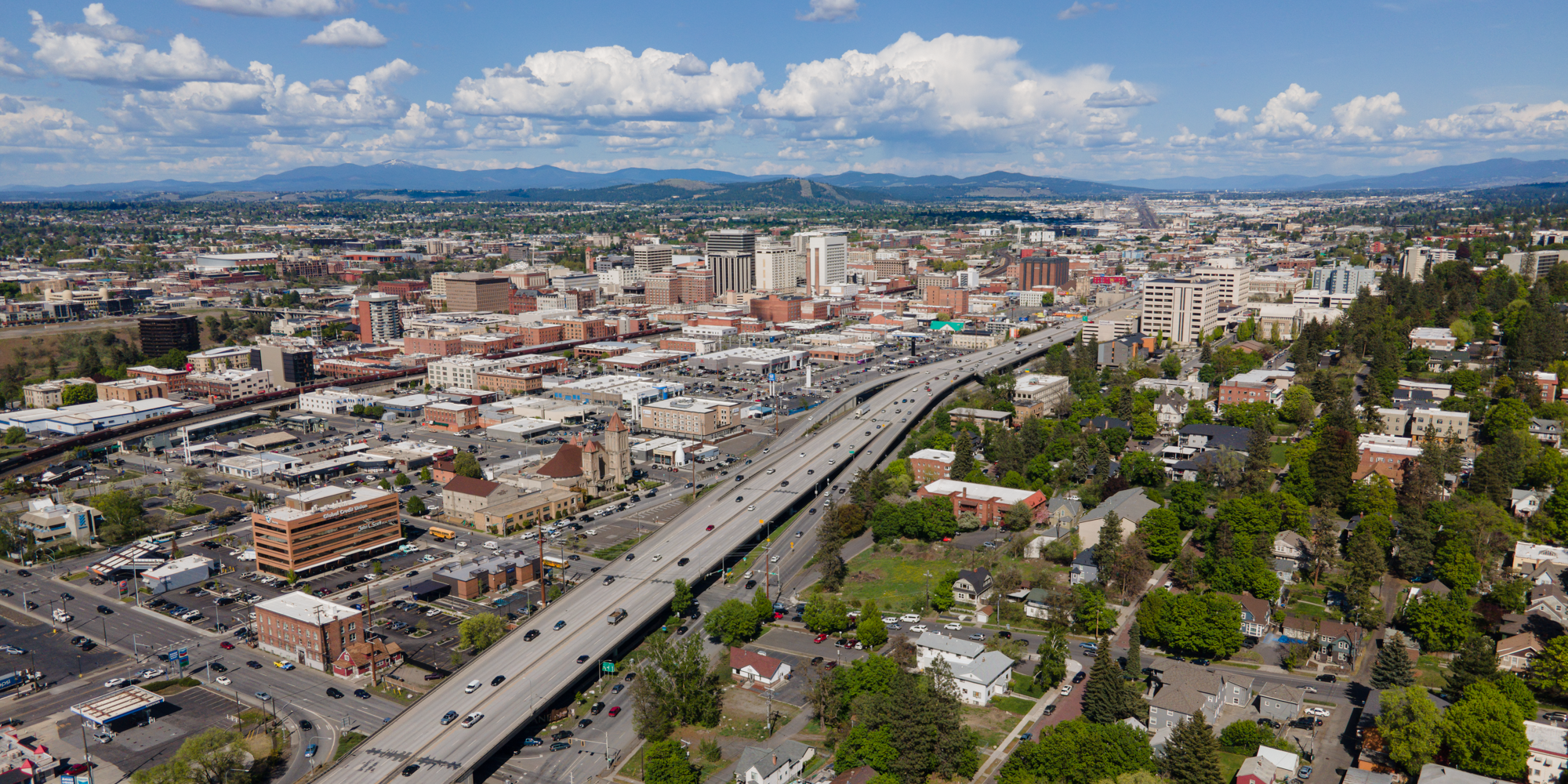
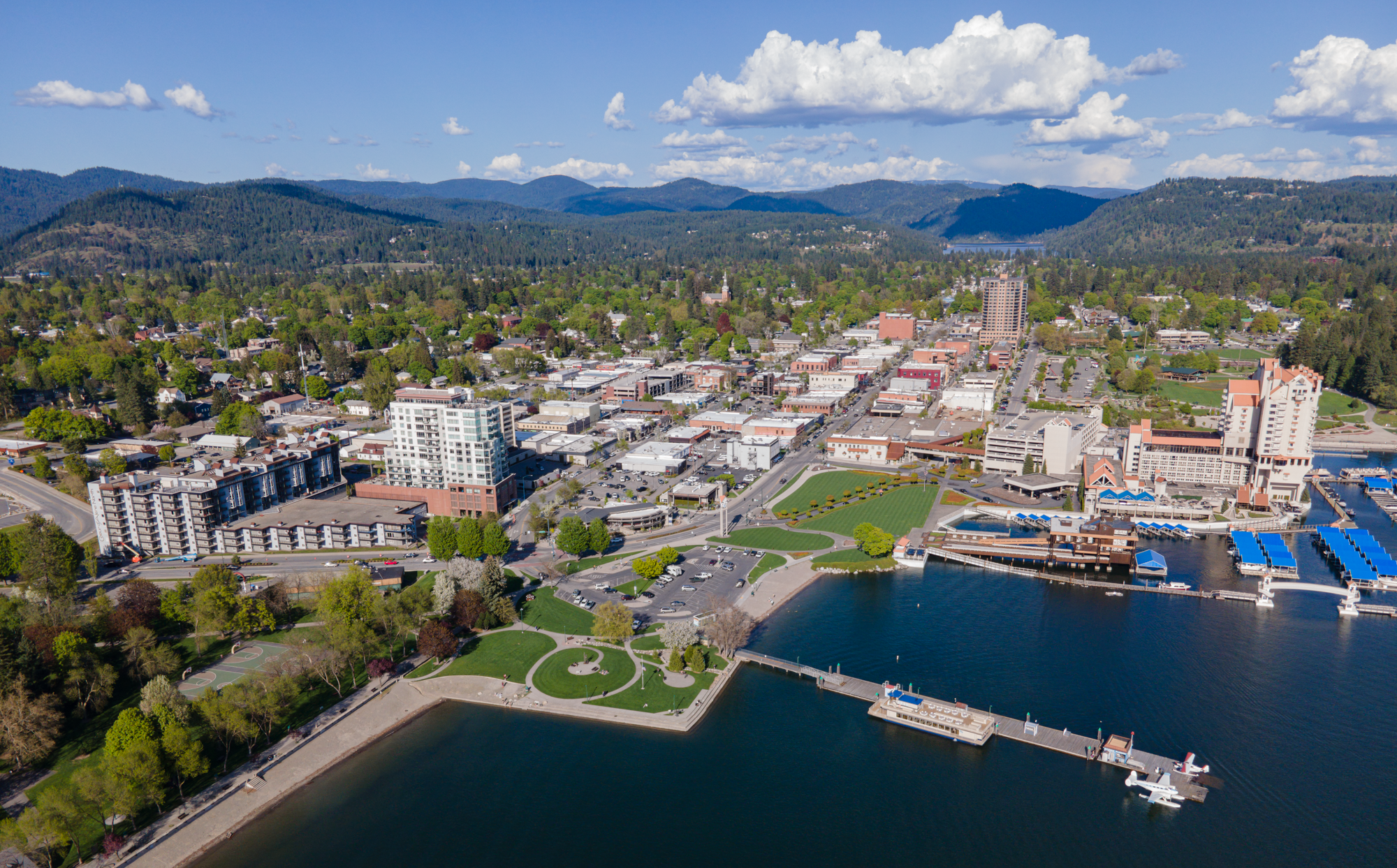
- From top: Skyline of Downtown Spokane with Spokane Valley in distant background to right, view of Coeur d'Alene, Idaho from above
Map of Spokane–Spokane Valley–
Coeur d'Alene, WA–ID CSA
City of Spokane, WA
Spokane–Spokane Valley, WA MSA
City of Coeur d'Alene, ID
Coeur d'Alene, ID MSA
- Country: United States
- State: Washington; Idaho
- Largest city: Spokane, WA (228,989)
- Other cities: Spokane Valley, WA (102,976); Coeur d'Alene, ID (54,628); Post Falls, ID (38,485); Hayden, ID (15,570); Cheney, WA (13,255); Liberty Lake, WA (12,003); Airway Heights, WA (10,757)

Area
  - Total: 6,885.7 sq mi (17,834 km^{2})
- Highest elevation: 7,320 ft (2,230 m)
- Lowest elevation: 1,109 ft (338 m)

Population (2024)
  - Total: 793,285
  - Density: 103/sq mi (39.9/km^{2})
- Time zone: UTC-8 (PST)
  - Summer (DST): UTC-7 (PDT)

Spokane–Coeur d'Alene combined statistical area, officially the Spokane–Spokane Valley–Coeur d'Alene, WA–ID CSA as defined by the United States Census Bureau, is a combined statistical area that comprises the Spokane metropolitan area and the Coeur d'Alene metropolitan area. The population was 793,285 as of 2024. It is the 70th largest Combined Statistical Area in the United States, and is the economic and cultural center of the Inland Northwest. The CSA is anchored by Spokane and its largest satellite, Coeur d'Alene, which are separated by suburbs that largely follow the path of the Spokane Valley and Rathdrum Prairie.

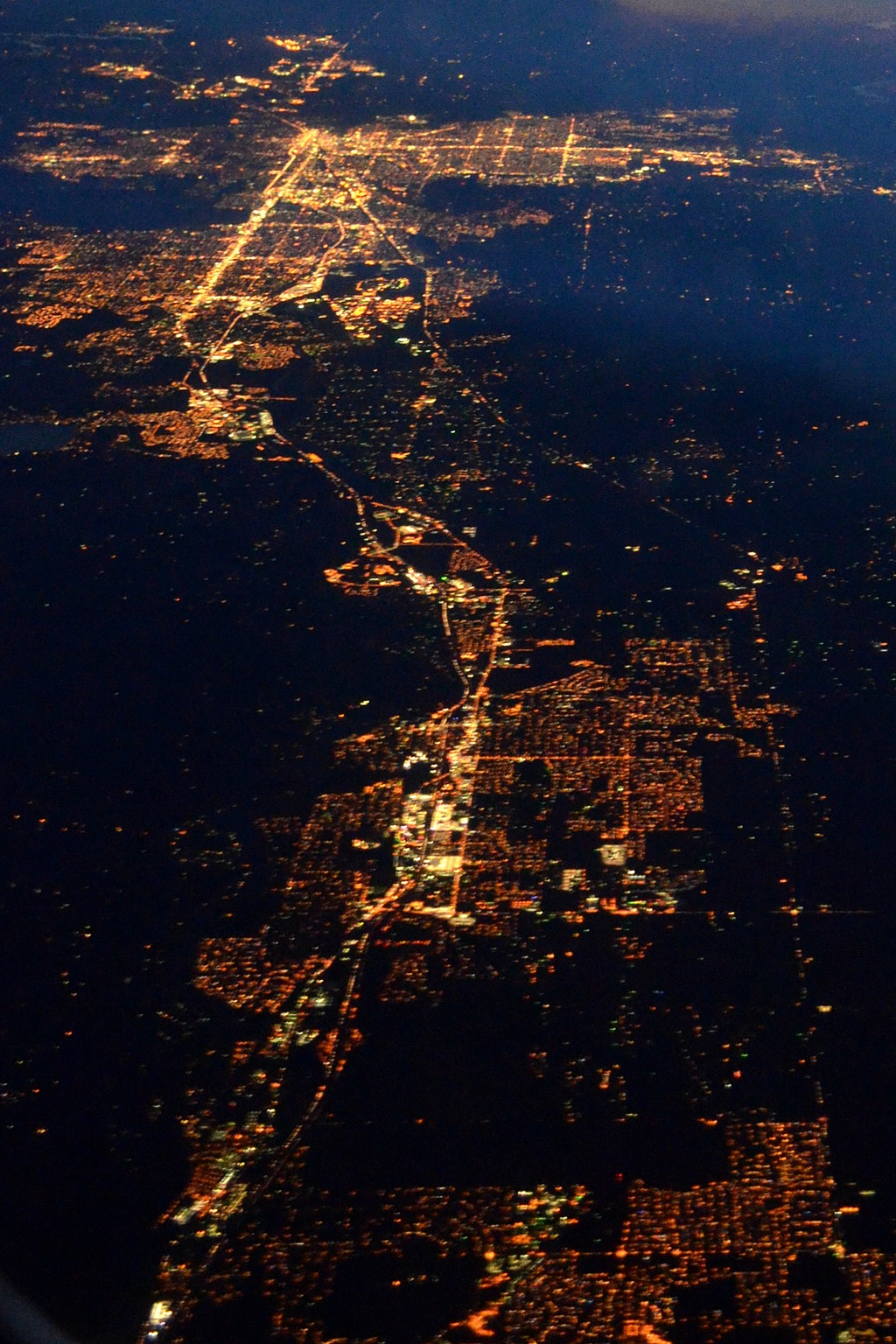
Night aerial view showing much of the primary urban area within the CSA

== Demographics ==
Statistical Area	2025 Estimate	2020 Census	Change	Area	Density
Spokane–Spokane Valley, WA Metropolitan Statistical Area	608,012	585,784	+3.79%	4,322 sq mi (11,190 km^{2})	141/sq mi (54/km^{2})
Coeur d'Alene, ID Metropolitan Statistical Area	191,864	171,362	+11.96%	1,316 sq mi (3,410 km^{2})	146/sq mi (56/km^{2})
Total	799,876	757,146	+5.64%	5,638 sq mi (14,600 km^{2})	142/sq mi (55/km^{2})

According to the American Community Survey 1-year estimates (ACS 2016), as of 2016, there were 710,575 people and 276,473 households residing within the CSA. The racial makeup of the MSA was 85.5% White, 1.4% African American, 1.5% Native American, 1.9% Asian, 0.4% Pacific Islander, 0.1% from other races, and 3.2% from two or more races. Hispanic or Latino of any race were 5% of the population.

The median income for a household in the MSA was $52,596, and about 13.7% of the population lived below the poverty line (including 17.3% of people under the age of 18 and 7.9% of people over the age of 65). The per capita income for the CSA was $27,860.

Historical population
Census	Pop.	Note	%±
1880	6,025		—
1890	45,936		662.4%
1900	78,301		70.5%
1910	187,448		139.4%
1920	187,135		−0.2%
1930	195,651		4.6%
1940	213,336		9.0%
1950	272,501		27.7%
1960	332,687		22.1%
1970	346,249		4.1%
1980	439,164		26.8%
1990	470,991		7.2%
2000	578,438		22.8%
2010	666,247		15.2%
2020	757,153		13.6%
2025 (est.)	799,876		5.6%

== Communities ==
=== Over 200,000 inhabitants ===
- Spokane

=== 100,000 to 200,000 inhabitants ===
- Spokane Valley

=== 50,000 to 99,999 inhabitants ===
- Coeur d'Alene

=== 10,000 to 49,999 inhabitants ===
- Airway Heights
- Cheney
- Fairwood
- Hayden
- Liberty Lake
- Post Falls
- Rathdrum

=== 5,000 to 9,999 inhabitants ===
- Country Homes
- Fairchild AFB
- Mead
- Medical Lake
- Otis Orchards-East Farms
- Suncrest
- Town and Country

=== 1,000 to 4,999 inhabitants ===
- Chewelah
- Colville
- Dalton Gardens
- Deer Park
- Kettle Falls
- Millwood
- Spirit Lake

=== Fewer than 1,000 inhabitants ===
- Addy
- Athol
- Clayton
- Conkling Park
- Fairfield
- Fernan Lake Village
- Four Lakes
- Green Bluff
- Hauser
- Harrison
- Hayden Lake
- Huetter
- Latah
- Loon Lake
- Marcus
- Northport
- Rockford
- Rockford Bay
- Spangle
- Springdale
- Stateline
- Waverly
- Worley
- Valley

=== Unincorporated places ===
- Amber
- Arden
- Bayview
- Bluecreek
- Cataldo
- Cedonia
- Chattaroy
- Clarksville
- Colbert
- Dartford
- Deep Creek
- Denison
- Echo
- Elk
- Espanola
- Evans
- Ford
- Four Lakes
- Freedom
- Freeman
- Fruitland
- Garwood
- Gifford
- Geiger Heights
- Glenrose
- Green Bluff
- Greenacres
- Hunters
- Lakeside
- Lane
- Marshall
- Mead
- Medimont
- Mica
- Milan
- Newman Lake
- Nine Mile Falls
- Onion Creek
- Orchard Prairie
- Peone
- Plaza
- Rice
- Ruby
- Spokane Bridge
- Tumtum (also known as Tum Tum)
- Tyler
- Valleyford
- Wellpinit
