= Cable Creek =

Stream in the state of Idaho

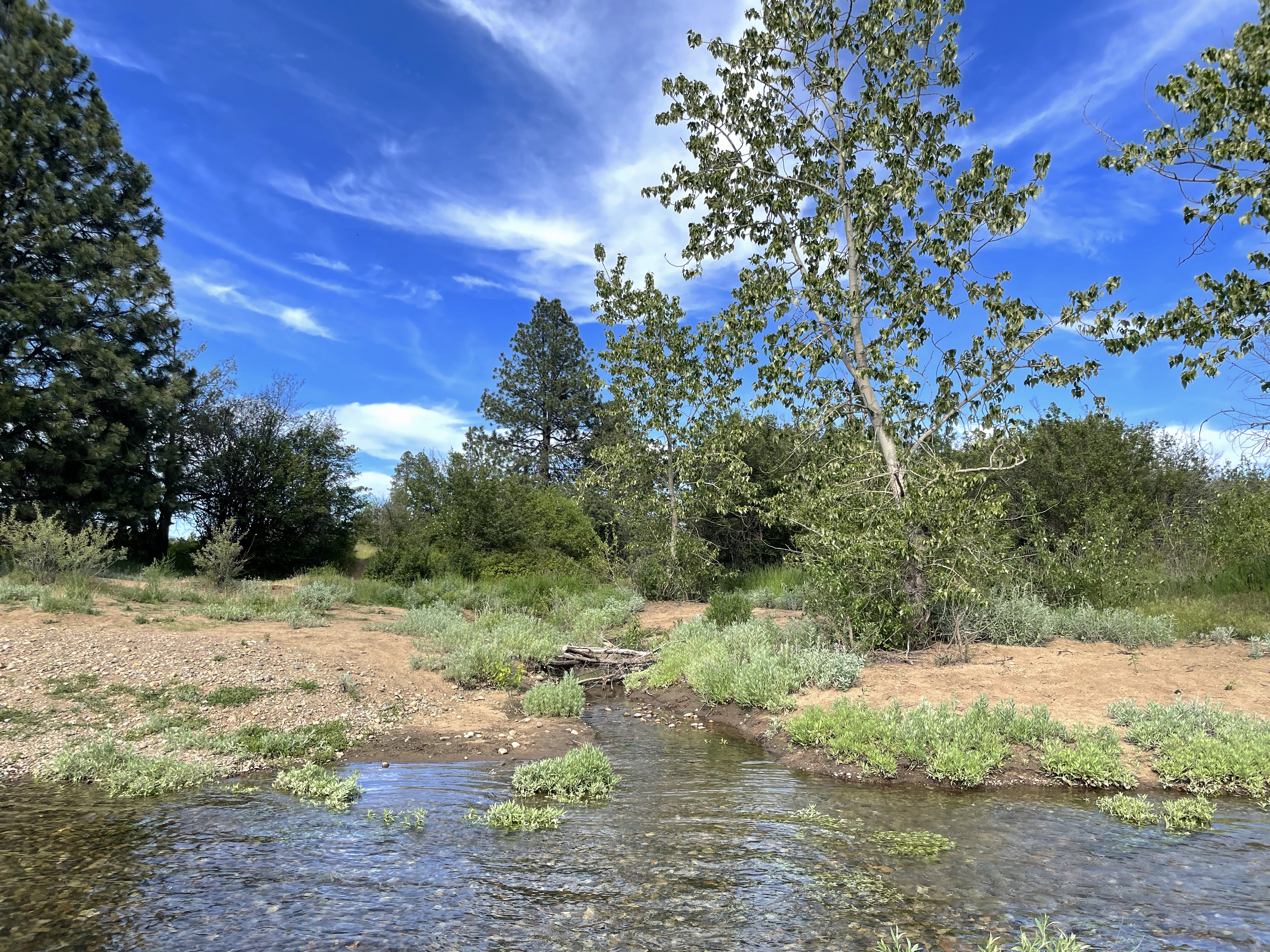
- Cable Creek mouth at the Spokane River

- Location of the mouth of Cable Creek in Washington Cable Creek (the United States)

Location
- Country: United States
- State: Washington, Idaho
- County: Kootenai, Spokane

Physical characteristics
- Source: Cable Peak
  - location: Kootenai County, Idaho
  - coordinates: 47°37′29″N 117°00′44″W
  - elevation: 4,557 ft (1,389 m)
- Mouth: Spokane River at
  - location: Liberty Lake, Washington
  - coordinates: 47°41′26″N 117°03′56″W
  - elevation: 2,024 ft (617 m)
- Length: 9.1 mi (14.6 km)

Basin features
- Progression: Spokane River → Columbia River → Pacific Ocean
- River system: Columbia River

Cable Creek is a stream of approximately 9 miles (14 km) which rises in the U.S. state of Idaho and has its mouth across the state line in Washington. A tributary of the Spokane River that flows from the forested slopes of Mica Peak into the suburban Spokane Valley just east of the city of Liberty Lake.

== Geography ==
Cable Creek flows roughly south to north from Cable Peak on the Mica Peak ridge at approximately 4,600 feet above sea level and enters the Spokane River at approximately 2,020 feet above sea level. The stream drops roughly 2,500 feet over the span of five miles. Most of that elevation change occurs in the first two miles, where the creek navigates down Mica Peak, the southernmost of the Selkirk Mountains.

The lower reaches of Cable Creek enter the Spokane Valley, with relatively flat terrain and a defined valley floor compared to the upper reaches. In this lower section Cable Creek transitions from a perennial stream into an intermittent stream, especially during the dry season. The stream flows under Interstate 90 and the Spokane River Centennial Trail just before meeting the Spokane River, immediately east of the city of Liberty Lake in the former community of Spokane Bridge. These very lower reaches of the creek are located in Gateway Regional Park and can be accessed via a trail network.

From its source in Idaho the stream crosses the state line three times, first into Washington, then back into Idaho, and ultimately into Washington once again. The source is located approximately one and a half miles east of the state line and the mouth is approximately one mile west of the state line. The upper portion is heavily forested and mountainous while the lower portion flows through farmland.

Most of the length of the stream flows through private property and is not open to public access. However, a portion of the creek where it transitions from the slopes of Mica Peak is accessible as it passes through an area owned by the Idaho Department of Lands. There is also public access along the lowest reaches of the creek between the state line and the mouth, where it passes under both the Liberty Lake–State Line Trail and the Spokane River Centennial Trail before joining the Spokane River at Gateway Regional Park.

== Gallery ==
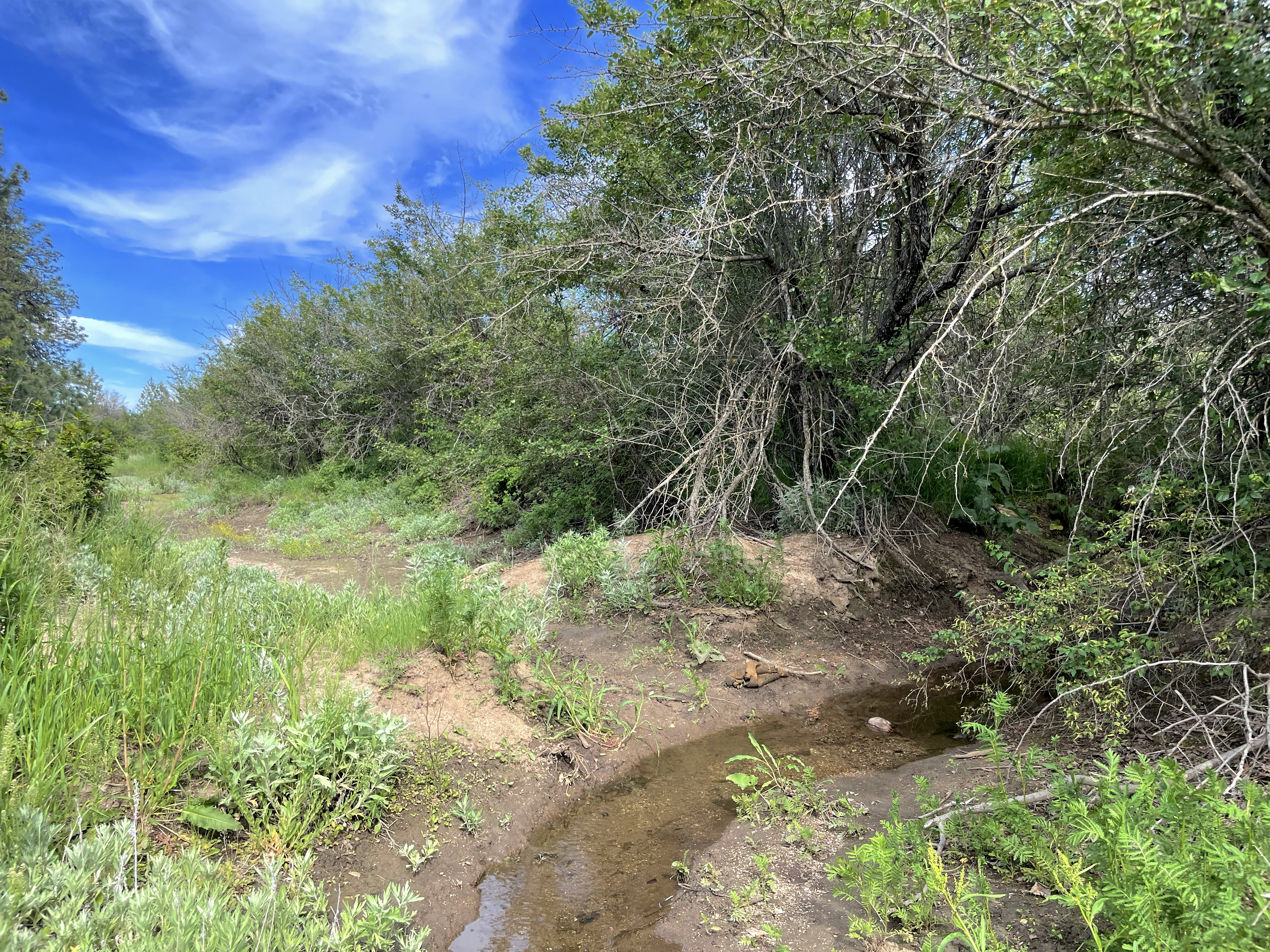
Cable Creek with an overflow channel to the right

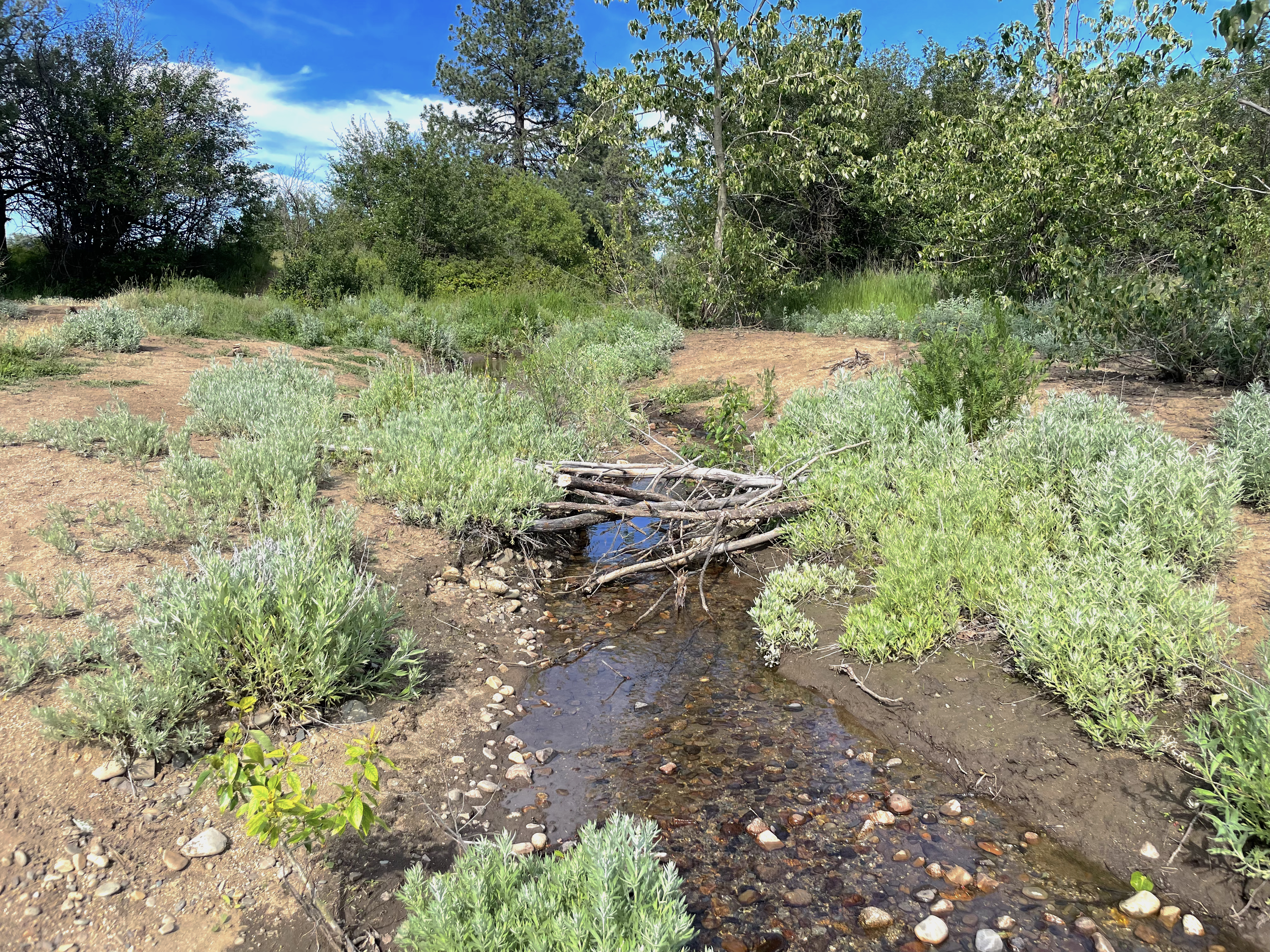
Looking upstream from the mouth of Cable Creek

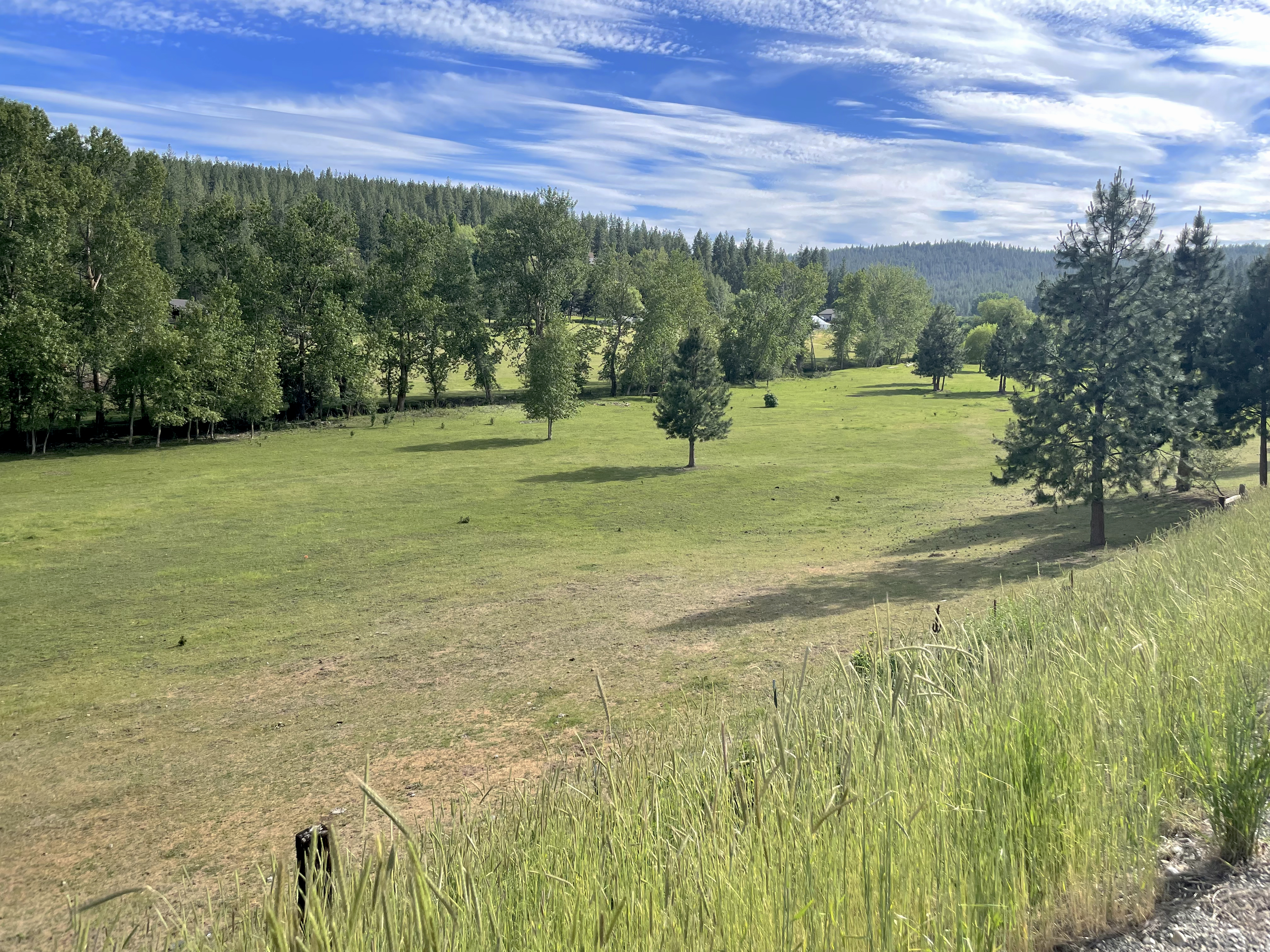
The valley of Cable Creek from Stateline Road at Hardison Road
