= Liberty Lake, Washington =

City in Washington, United States

- City
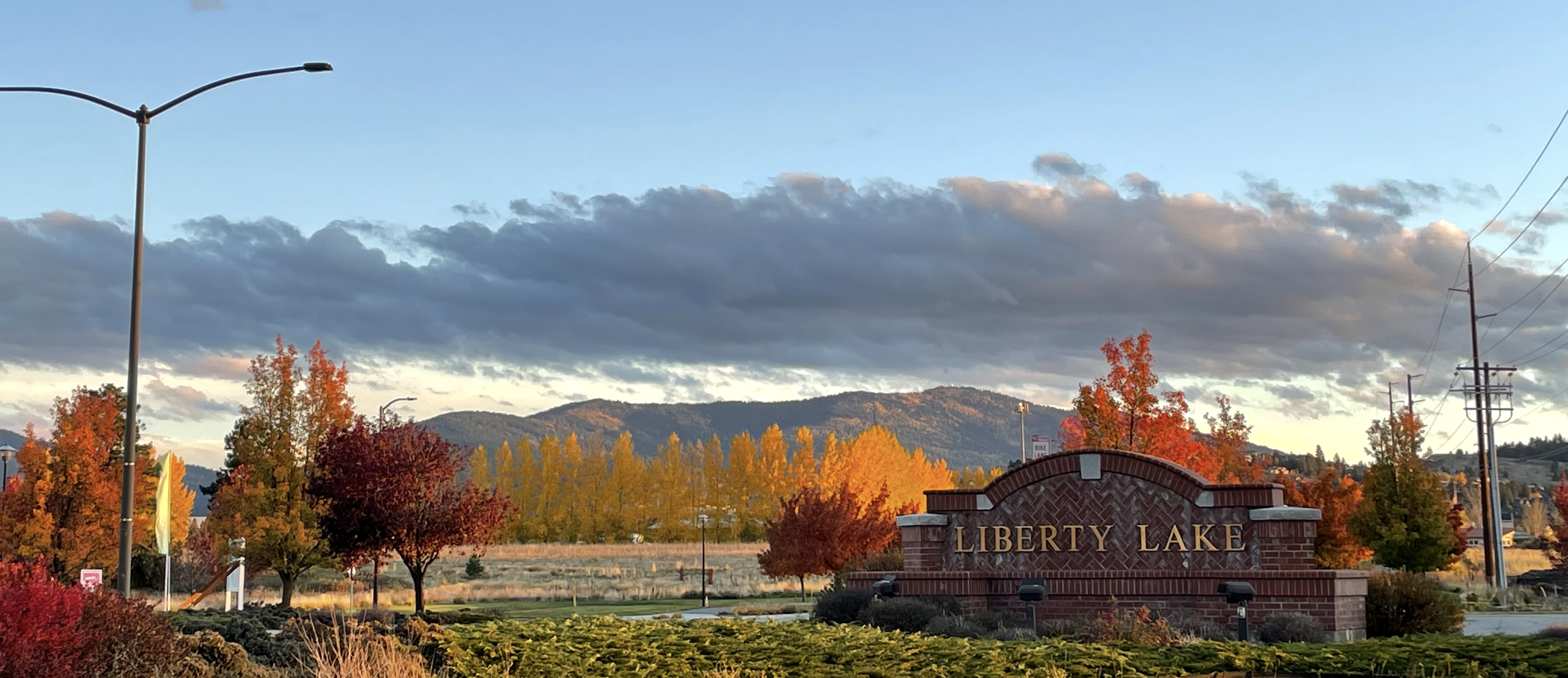
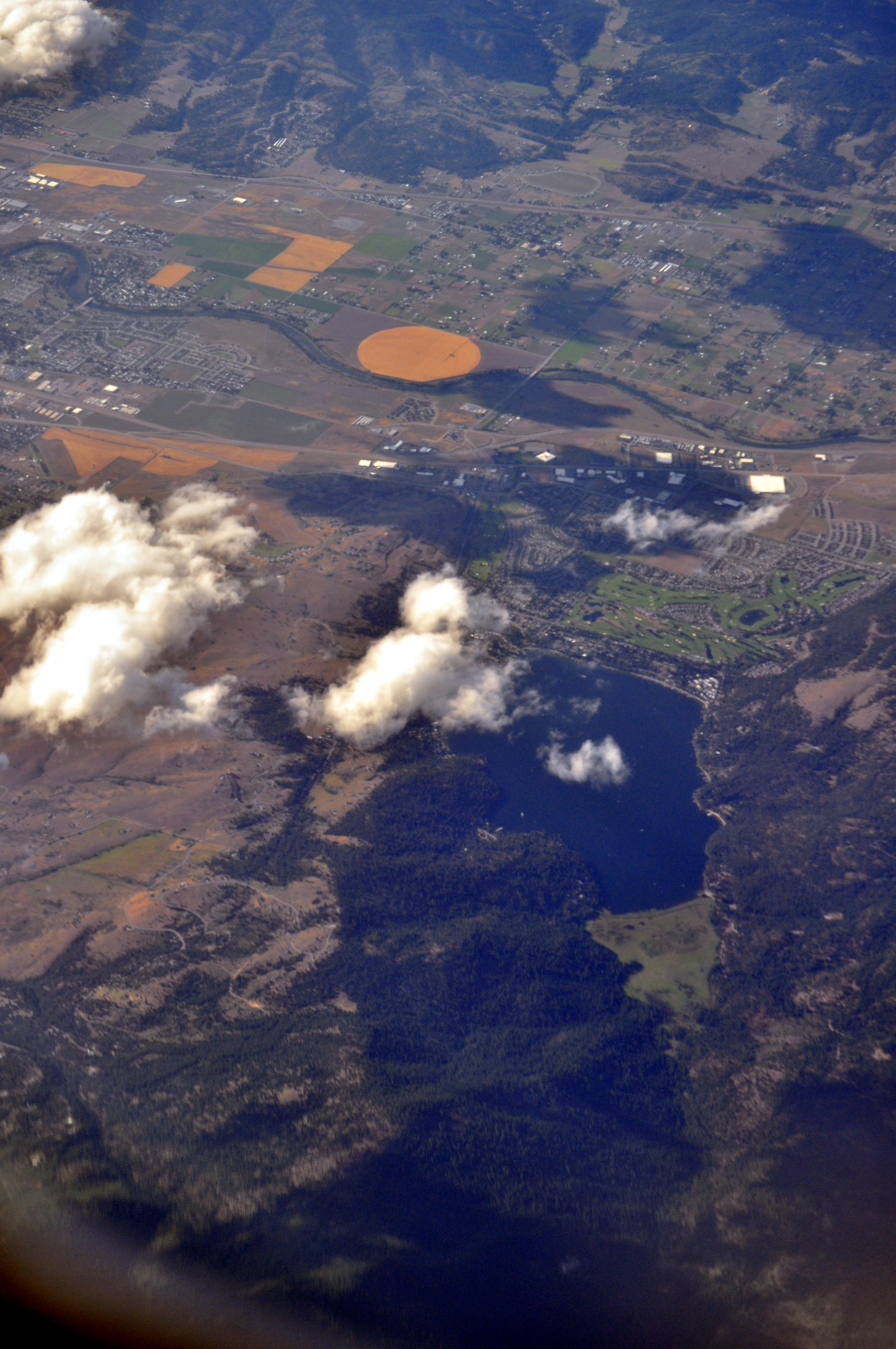
- Liberty Lake welcome sign on Harvard Road Aerial view of Liberty Lake (lake and city, 2013) from roughly south by southeast. The city is immediately north of the lake and runs somewhat further west than the lake. The Spokane River, near the top of the photo, forms the northern border of the city.
- Interactive map of Liberty Lake, Washington
- Coordinates: 47.668451°N 117.104201°W
- Country: United States
- State: Washington
- County: Spokane
- Incorporated: August 31, 2001
- Named for: Liberty Lake

Government
  - Type: Mayor–council
  - Mayor: Cris Kaminskas

Area
  - Total: 6.344 sq mi (16.432 km^{2})
  - Land: 6.344 sq mi (16.432 km^{2})
  - Water: 0 sq mi (0.000 km^{2}) 0.0%
- Elevation: 2,070 ft (630 m)

Population (2020)
  - Total: 12,003
  - Estimate (2024): 13,353
  - Density: 1,891.9/sq mi (730.46/km^{2})
- Time zone: UTC−8 (Pacific (PST))
  - Summer (DST): UTC−7 (PDT)
- ZIP Code: 99019
- Area code: 509
- FIPS code: 53-39335
- GNIS feature ID: 2410834
- Website: libertylakewa.gov

Liberty Lake is a city in Spokane County, Washington, United States, located adjacent to the eponymous lake. Located just over a mile (about 2 km) west of the Washington–Idaho border, Liberty Lake is both a suburb of Spokane, Washington, and a bedroom community to Coeur d'Alene, Idaho. The population was 12,003 at the 2020 census, and was estimated at 13,353 in 2024.

Liberty Lake was named after a pioneer who settled near the lake, Etienne Edward Laliberte (anglicized as Steve Liberty). The town was previously called Arturdee.

== History ==
The first homestead on modern-day Liberty Lake was established in 1871 by Etienne Eduard La Liberte, a Quebec-born mail carrier known locally as Stephen Liberty, for whom the lake is named. The area was also known as Arturdee. The lake later became a recreation destination for Spokane residents and a resort hotel was built on the north shore. A private club purchased 50 acres (20 ha) on the north side of the lake in 1945 for a nine-hole golf course and residential community. The land was sold to the county government in 1957 and became the Liberty Lake Golf Course, a public facility. Liberty Lake itself was noted for its trout fishing and had four lakeside resorts by 1959.

A sewer district around Liberty Lake was formed in 1973 to address water pollution issues within the lake that had been studied by Washington State University. A sewage system was built later in the decade and was followed by a wastewater treatment plant in 1982. A citizens' group proposed the incorporation of Liberty Lake into a city in the late 1990s to manage recent residential and commercial growth in the community. Liberty Lake was officially incorporated on August 31, 2001, but the lake remained outside of the city's boundaries. Within its first three years, the city government purchased a private golf course, expanded an existing community library, and established a police department with six officers.

== Geography ==
Liberty Lake is located in the Spokane Valley. According to the United States Census Bureau, the city has a total area of 6.344 square miles (16.43 km^{2}), all land.

The city is bounded by the Spokane River on the north from Hodges Road in the west to approximately Molter Road. At Molter the border shifts south to Interstate-90, which it follows to within a mile of the Idaho state line. Sprague Avenue marks the southern portion of the city limits in the east to Liberty Lake Road, from which it zig-zags west to Appleway Road at Hodges. The lake itself is located outside of the city limits about three blocks south of Sprague.

Liberty Lake is one of the fastest-growing communities in the State of Washington. Liberty Lake is south of the Spokane River from Otis Orchards-East Farms, Washington, east of Greenacres, Washington (now part of Spokane Valley, Washington), and west of Spokane Bridge, Washington, State Line, Idaho, and Post Falls, Idaho.

Areas east of Liberty Lake Road and areas north of Appleway Road lie on the relatively flat land along the floor of the Spokane Valley. Elevations there range from between 2,000 feet above sea level at the river to around 2,150 feet around Liberty Lake Elementary School. The areas west of Liberty Lake Road and south of Appleway Road show far more topographical relief, rising from around 2,100 feet to over 2,600 feet on Carlson Hill. Kramer Hill, which rises just beyond the eastern limit of the city, quickly rises to above 2,700 feet. While Mica Peak, which rises beyond the southern shore of the lake, climbs to nearly 5,200 feet.

== Demographics ==
Historical population
Census	Pop.	Note	%±
1980	1,599		—
1990	2,015		26.0%
2000	4,660		131.3%
2010	7,591		62.9%
2020	12,003		58.1%
2024 (est.)	13,353		11.2%
U.S. Decennial Census; 1970 1980 1990; 2000 2010 2020; 1980, 1990, and 2000 reflect the population of the Liberty Lake CDP

Prior to incorporation, Liberty Lake was the name of a census-designated place (CDP) first listed in the 1980 U.S. census. The city itself includes portions of the dissolved Liberty Lake CDP, Green Acres CDP, and other areas.

=== Racial and ethnic composition ===
Liberty Lake city, Washington – Racial and ethnic composition Note: the US Census treats Hispanic/Latino as an ethnic category. This table excludes Latinos from the racial categories and assigns them to a separate category. Hispanics/Latinos may be of any race.
Race / Ethnicity (NH = Non-Hispanic)	Pop 2000	Pop 2010	Pop 2020	% 2000	% 2010	% 2020
White alone (NH)	4,302	6,788	10,126	92.32%	89.42%	84.36%
Black or African American alone (NH)	32	50	84	0.69%	0.66%	0.70%
Native American or Alaska Native alone (NH)	8	36	89	0.17%	0.47%	0.74%
Asian alone (NH)	121	267	324	2.60%	3.52%	2.70%
Native Hawaiian or Pacific Islander alone (NH)	6	16	23	0.13%	0.21%	0.19%
Other race alone (NH)	7	8	44	0.15%	0.11%	0.37%
Mixed race or Multiracial (NH)	80	198	600	1.72%	2.61%	5.00%
Hispanic or Latino (any race)	104	228	713	2.23%	3.00%	5.94%
Total	4,660	7,591	12,003	100.00%	100.00%	100.00%

=== 2020 census ===
As of the 2020 census, Liberty Lake had a population of 12,003 and a median age of 39.1 years. 26.4% of residents were under the age of 18 and 16.7% were 65 years of age or older. For every 100 females there were 93.4 males, and for every 100 females age 18 and over there were 87.8 males.

The population density was 1,921.40 inhabitants per square mile (741.9/km^{2}), and there were 4,916 housing units at an average density of 786.94 per square mile (303.8/km^{2}).

100.0% of residents lived in urban areas, while 0.0% lived in rural areas.

There were 4,711 households, of which 34.6% had children under the age of 18 living in them. Of all households, 55.9% were married-couple households, 13.6% were households with a male householder and no spouse or partner present, and 24.8% were households with a female householder and no spouse or partner present. About 25.7% of all households were made up of individuals and 10.6% had someone living alone who was 65 years of age or older.

Of those housing units, 4.2% were vacant. The homeowner vacancy rate was 1.2% and the rental vacancy rate was 5.2%.

Racial composition as of the 2020 census
Race	Number	Percent
White	10,344	86.2%
Black or African American	87	0.7%
American Indian and Alaska Native	98	0.8%
Asian	341	2.8%
Native Hawaiian and Other Pacific Islander	28	0.2%
Some other race	181	1.5%
Two or more races	924	7.7%

=== 2010 census ===
As of the 2010 census, there were 7,591 people, 2,893 households, 2,019 families residing in the city. The population density was 1,236.3 inhabitants per square mile (477.3/km^{2}). There were 3,344 housing units at an average density of 544.6 per square mile (210.3/km^{2}). The racial makeup of the city was 91.29% White, 0.67% African American, 0.51% Native American, 3.54% Asian, 0.21% Pacific Islander, 0.76% from some other races and 3.00% from two or more races. Hispanic or Latino people of any race were 3.00% of the population.

There were 2,893 households 40.0% had children under the age of 18 living with them, 56.9% were married couples living together, 9.2% had a female householder with no husband present, 3.7% had a male householder with no wife present, and 30.2% were non-families. 24.6% of households were one person and 8% were one person aged 65 or older. The average household size was 2.62 and the average family size was 3.15.

The median age was 35.2 years. 30.4% of residents were under the age of 18; 5.8% were between the ages of 18 and 24; 29.3% were from 25 to 44; 23.8% were from 45 to 64; and 10.6% were 65 or older. The gender makeup of the city was 48.3% male and 51.7% female.

== Government ==
Liberty Lake was incorporated on August 31, 2001, and operates with a mayor–council government. There are seven members on the city council who are elected to four-year terms.

== Media ==
The Liberty Lake Splash, a free community-oriented weekly newspaper is distributed in the city and in the Spokane Valley; the paper has a circulation of about 6,000 copies per week.

== Education ==
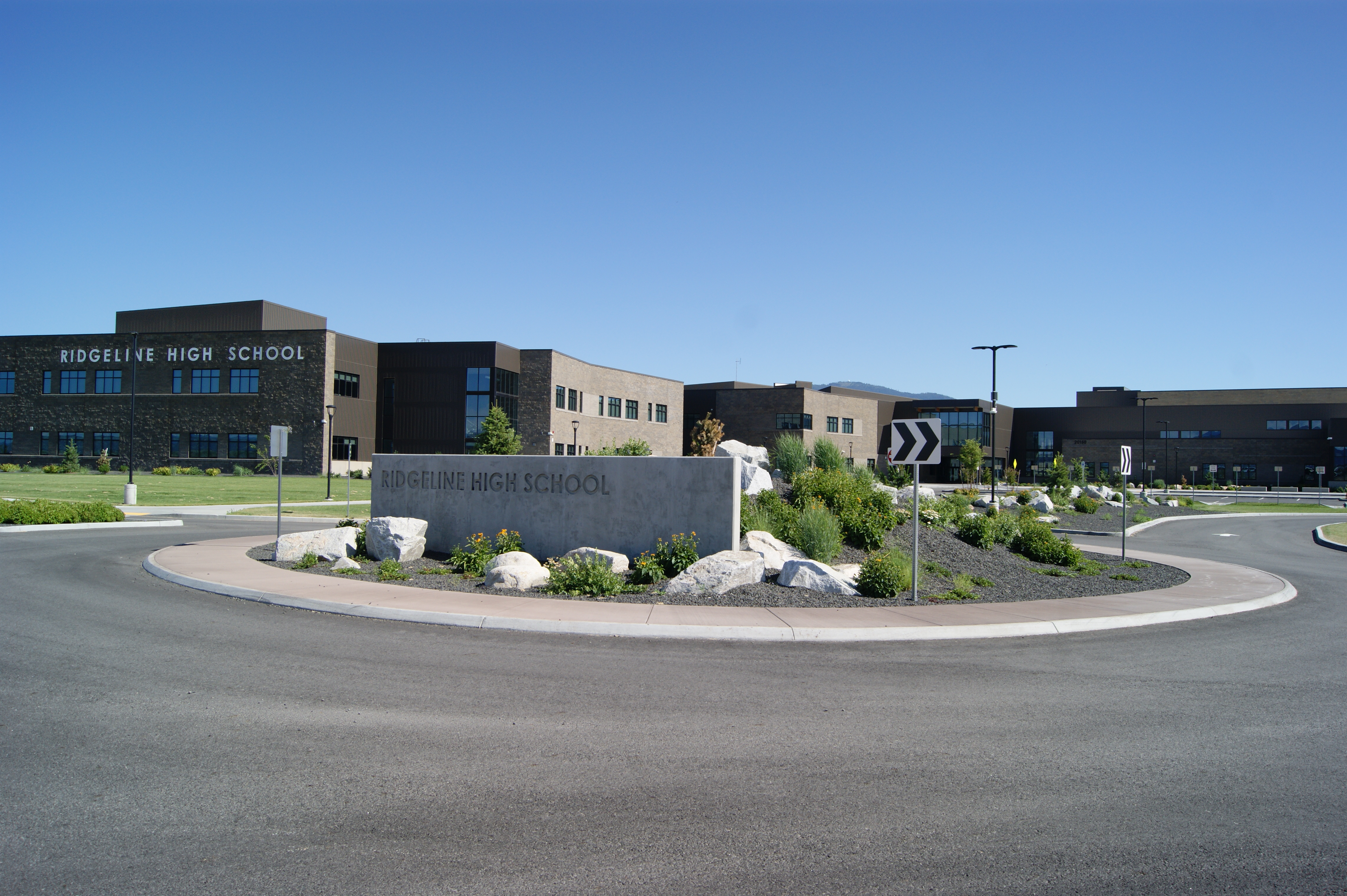
Ridgeline High School

Liberty Lake's public schools are operated by Central Valley School District 356, which has three elementary schools, a middle school, and a high school. Multiple private schools are located within Liberty Lake as well.

Liberty Lake has a municipal library that has 9,612 square feet (893.0 m^{2}). It is separate from the Spokane County Library District, but the systems have reciprocal agreements to allow members to obtain library cards from each.

== Notable people ==
- Lexie Hull, professional basketball player selected in the 1st round of the 2022 WNBA draft
- Tyler Johnson, Liberty Lake native and back-to-back Stanley Cup winner with the Tampa Bay Lightning
