= Spokane area =

The Spokane area may refer to:

- The Spokane–Coeur d'Alene combined statistical area
- The Spokane metropolitan area
- The Spokane, WA—ID urban area
