= HDG Architecture =

Architecture firm based in Washington, US

HDG Architecture is an American architectural firm based in Spokane, Washington founded in 2010. The firm works on commercial mixed-use projects, interior and hospitality design and on residential interior/exterior renovations and architecture. HDG is licensed in 10 states, including Idaho, Washington, Montana, Oregon, Hawaii, California, and New York.

In 2014, HDG Architecture received the AIA Merit Award for Nudo Ramen House. The firm earned this recognition again in 2017 for its own office building in downtown Spokane and in 2018 for the Canopy Credit Union building in Spokane Valley, WA.

== History ==
HDG Architecture (Hissong Design Group PLLC) was founded in 2010 by designer Joshua Hissong. He was later joined by Armando Hurtado. Initially focused on restaurant design, the company also engaged in residential projects. Hissong expanded his business by opening Wasabi Sushi in Spokane in that same year.

In 2013, HDG acquired Propaganda Creative, a graphic design and marketing agency, broadening its service offerings to include brand identity, marketing, and digital advertising. This acquisition was part of a collaboration with Jason Clerget and Kyle Hurley. The firm continued to expand its operations with the opening of NUDO Ramen House by Hissong in 2014.

In 2016, HDG acquired a 50% stake in a fabrication company Acadie Woodworks which was subsequently rebranded as Faber. This acquisition enabled HDG to take on more large-scale commercial projects. That same year, Hissong partnered with Matt Goodwin of Goodwin Group to open Remedy Kitchen, a restaurant concept.

In 2017, HDG purchased and developed its current office location in Spokane. The company continued to evolve, selling its stake in Faber to a Midwest-based company in 2019 and selling Propaganda Creative to its managing partners in 2020.

In 2018, HDG entered the high-end custom residential market with a highly successful mid-century modern remodel on Lake Coeur d’Alene, led by Robert Arndt, a recent hire from Seattle. Alongside Danny Torgerson, Steven Hewett, and Noah Rinaldi, Arndt contributed to the design and execution of numerous custom homes over the following years. Shortly thereafter, HDG expanded its team further by hiring architect Michael Mannhard to complete their roster.

In 2023, HDG launched a sister company in partnership with Aubrey Plaisance, Stroom Interiors – A Spokane-based furniture procurement firm.

== Awards and honors ==
The firm has been awarded 3 AIA awards for the design of the Canopy Credit Union along with the HDG Office Building in Downtown Spokane, WA.

HDG was awarded top architect 2022–2024 in Mountain Living Magazine.
