= Rathdrum =

Rathdrum may refer to:

- Rathdrum, Idaho, United States
  - Rathdrum Prairie, the prairie on which Rathdrum, Idaho is located
- Rathdrum, County Wicklow, Ireland
