= Holiday Hills (Washington) =

Loam hills in Spokane County, Washington

Highest point
- Peak: Carlson Hill
- Elevation: 2,664 ft (812 m)
- Coordinates: 47.65018°N 117.1205°W

Dimensions
- Length: 3.5 mi (5.6 km) NS
- Width: 1.5 mi (2.4 km) EW
- Area: 4.4 mi^{2} (11 km^{2})

Geography
- Country: United States
- State: Washington
- Parent range: Selkirk Mountains
- Borders on: The Saltese Flats, The Spokane Valley and Liberty Lake

Geology
- Rock type: Gneiss

The Holiday Hills are a series of mostly treeless, loam hills in Spokane County, Washington, in the foothills of the Selkirk Range. The portion of the hills immediately to the east of the adjacent Saltese Flats are known as the Saltese Uplands.

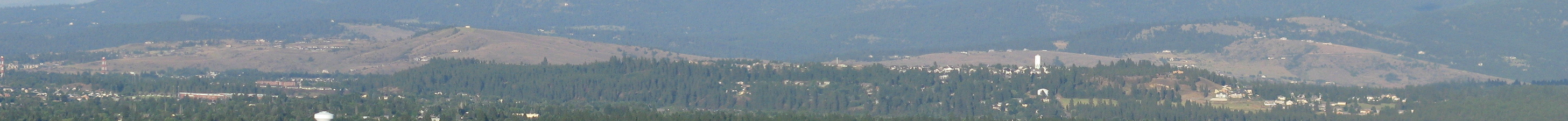
Panorama of the treeless Holiday Hills looking east from Eagle Peak.

== History ==
Originally the hills were unnamed, but a resort known as the "Holiday Hills Ski Resort" opened on Carlson Hill in the 1970's, and people began erroneously calling the hill "Holiday Hill". Eventually this name fell out of use, and the name "Holiday Hills" spread to refer to the surrounding hills as a whole. The name soon also spread to local businesses. Despite the resort and many other businesses eventually closing down, the hills retained their name. "Holiday Road" in Spokane Valley and "Holiday Hills Drive" in Liberty Lake are named after the hills.

== Carlson Hill ==
Carlson Hill
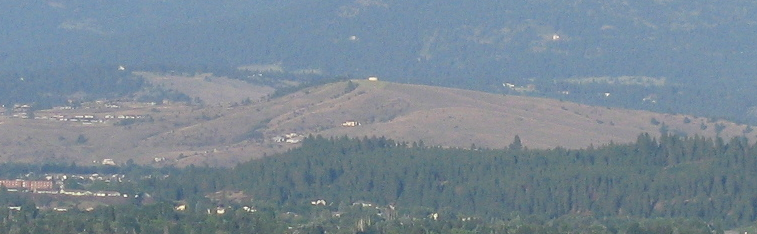

Highest point
- Elevation: 2,664 ft (812 m)
- Prominence: 623 ft (190 m)
- Coordinates: 47°39′01″N 117°06′59″W

Geography
- Location: Spokane County, Washington
- Parent range: Holiday Hills
- Topo map: USGS Liberty Lake

Carlson Hill is a summit in Spokane County in the U.S. state of Washington. Carlson Hill, is the highest peak of the Holiday Hills.
