= Leata =

Defunct American motor vehicle manufacturer

Stinebaugh Manufacturing Inc.
- Company type: Public company
- Industry: Automotive
- Founded: Post Falls, Idaho, United States (1975)
- Founder: Donald E. Stinebaugh
- Defunct: 1977; 49 years ago
- Headquarters: Post Falls, Idaho, United States
- Area served: United States
- Key people: Donald E. Stinebaugh, Leonard D. "Sonny" Stinebaugh (1946-2001)
- Products: Microcars, Luxury cars

The Leata was an automobile manufactured by Stinebaugh Manufacturing Inc, founded by Donald E. Stinebaugh (1916-1992) with his son Leonard D. "Sonny" Stinebaugh (1946-2001) in Post Falls, Idaho.

The first model produced in 1975 was a boxy 2-door sedan powered by a 4-cylinder Continental engine, producing 50 bhp and giving the car a top speed of 112 kilometres per hour (70 mph), as well as fuel economy of 39-55 miles per gallon. The car sold for $2895, and Stinebaugh claimed to have manufactured 23 of the cars & 4 flat bed truck by the end of March 1975. The company employed 15 workers, and Stinebaugh claimed that he was looking to produce between 1,000 and 1,500 cars a year.

In 1977, a more modern-looking vehicle was launched, called the Cabalero. Stinebaugh named the car after his wife Hilda (Erickson) Stinebaugh, giving the car her nickname, Leata — a misunderstanding of litt, Norwegian for "little."

The Cabalero was powered by a 4-cylinder General Motors LY-5 engine, and featured power windows, power seat and cruise control — as well as baroque styling with custom fibreglass body panels, round headlights in square bezels, a rectangular "classic" grille, and heavily styled mudguards; Two models were made - a pickup or hatchback.

Just 97 Leatas were made before the company closed down in late 1977.
