= Holiday Hills =

Holiday Hills may refer to:

- The Holiday Hills in the U.S. state of Washington
- Holiday Hills, Illinois
- Holiday Hills, Delaware
- Holiday Hills, a 2021 EP by Canadian DJ duo Loud Luxury
