= Saltese Uplands Conservation Area =

Coordinates: 47.641°N 117.118°W

The Saltese Uplands Conservation Area is a 522 acre conservation area in Spokane County in the U.S. state of Washington. The conservation area covers the Saltese Uplands, which are situated on the western slope of the Holiday Hills, immediately to the east of the adjacent Saltese Flats. The area is open to the public and contains 7 miles (11 km) of trails.

== Climate ==
The western slope of the Saltese Uplands are the driest part of the Spokane Valley and experience a Mediterranean climate (Köppen Csa), closely bordering on a semi-arid climate (Köppen Bsk). The Uplands are a shrub-steppe, and one of the only shrub-lands left in the Spokane area.

== See also ==
- Saltese Flats
- Spokane Valley
- Spokane County, Washington
- Conservation area
- Shrub-steppe
- Mediterranean climate
- Semi-arid climate
- Köppen climate classification
