= Mica Peak =

Mountains in Idaho and Washington, United States

Mica Peak, Idaho & Mica Peak, Washington
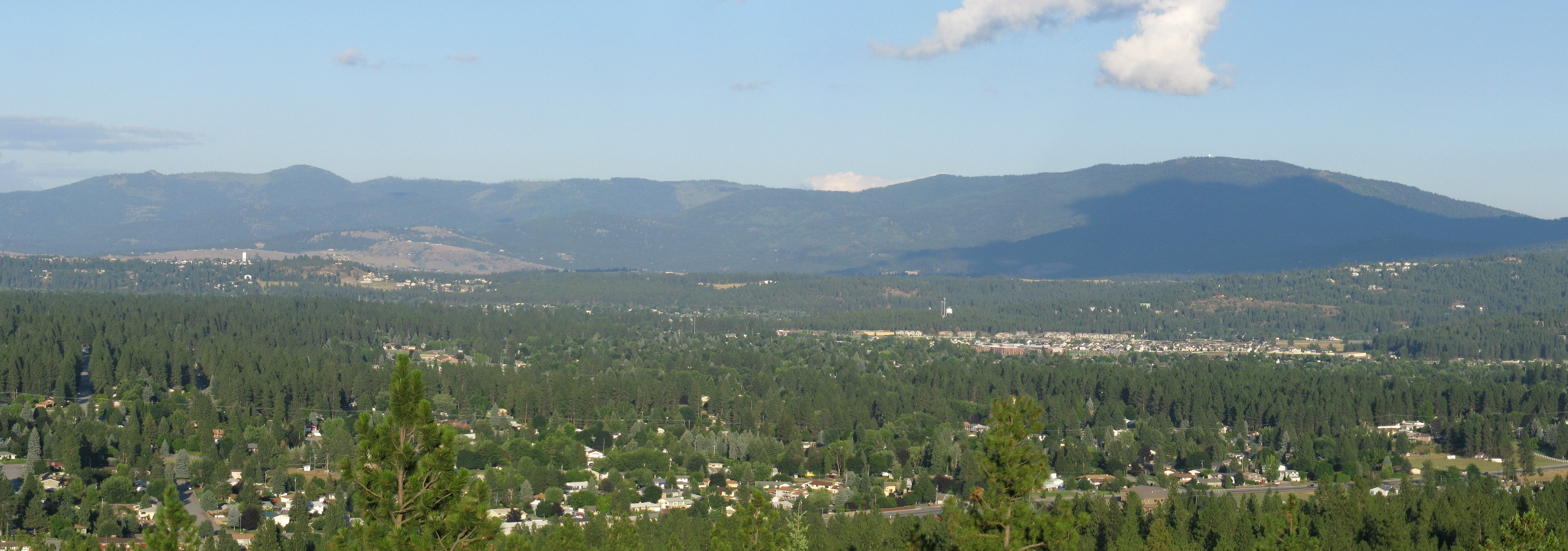
- Mica Peak, Idaho (left) and Mica Peak, Washighton (right) as viewed from Eagle Peak in Spokane County.

Highest point
- Elevation: Mica Peak (ID) 5,241 ft (1,597 m); Mica Peak (WA) 5,209 ft (1,588 m)
- Prominence: 2,661 ft (811 m)
- Coordinates: 47°37′20″N 116°59′18″W (ID); 47°34′24″N 117°04′52″W (WA)

Geography
- Location: Spokane County, Washington; Kootenai County, Idaho
- Parent range: Selkirk Mountains
- Topo map: USGS Rockford Bay

Mica Peak is the name of two separate mountain summits in the United States located approximately 5.49 miles (9 km) apart; one in Spokane County, Washington and the other in Kootenai County, Idaho. The two peaks are located along the same ridge, which separates the Spokane Valley and Rathdrum Prairie from the Palouse. The mountains have an elevation difference of only 31 ft (9.4 m) and are the southernmost peaks of the Selkirk Mountains.

Other summits located along the same ridge include the 4,045 ft (1,233 m) Round Mountain, the 4,924 ft (1,501 m) Cable Peak, the 4,852 ft (1,479 m) Shasta Butte, and the 4,377 ft (1,334 m) Blossom Mountain.

During the Prohibition Era Mica Peak was the site of numerous bootlegging operations. The mountainous and thickly forested terrain provided cover that allowed the bootleggers to hide their stills. Most were small, individual operations but some larger commercial endeavors existed as well. The mountain's location on the state line, which inconsistently demarcated in the area, made the location even more ideal for the illegal ventures as Idaho and Washington authorities could be easily tricked into believing the stills were located just outside of their jurisdiction.

== Mica Peak (Idaho) ==
Mica Peak or Signal Point—located in Kootenai County—is the higher of the two peaks with an elevation of 5,243 feet (1,598 m). State Line is the closest city at seven miles (11 km) away.

The name Signal Point is derived from a ski lodge of the same name that operated on the northeast face of the mountain in the 1950s–1960s. The ski lodge utilized a rope tow and the lodge building (47.6275°N 116.9813°W) can be seen as a dot on topographic maps from the time period but is no longer standing.

== Mica Peak (Washington) ==
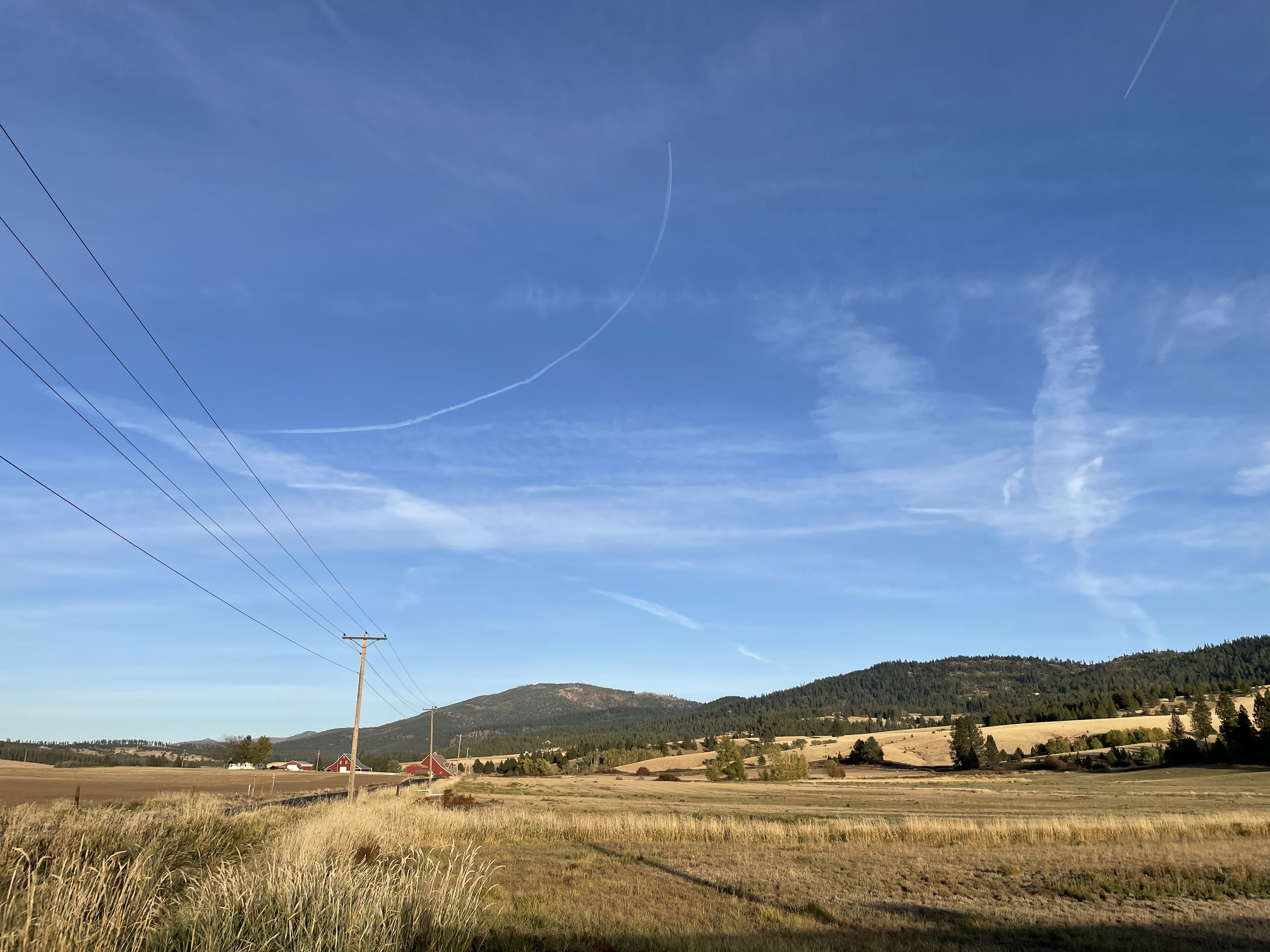
Mica Peak (Washington) viewed from the community of Mica, Washington; the Mica Peak Radar Station is visible at the summit.

Mica Peak (Washington)—located in Spokane County—is the lower of the two peaks with an elevation of 5,209 feet (1,588 m). The mountain is the southernmost peak in the Selkirk range. The peak is home to the now-decommissioned Mica Peak Air Force Station. The northern slopes are drained by Saltese Creek. The mountain dominates the view to the east and southeast from the city of Spokane Valley.

== See also ==
- Mica Peak Air Force Station
