= Rathdrum Prairie =

Flat region of Idaho, United States

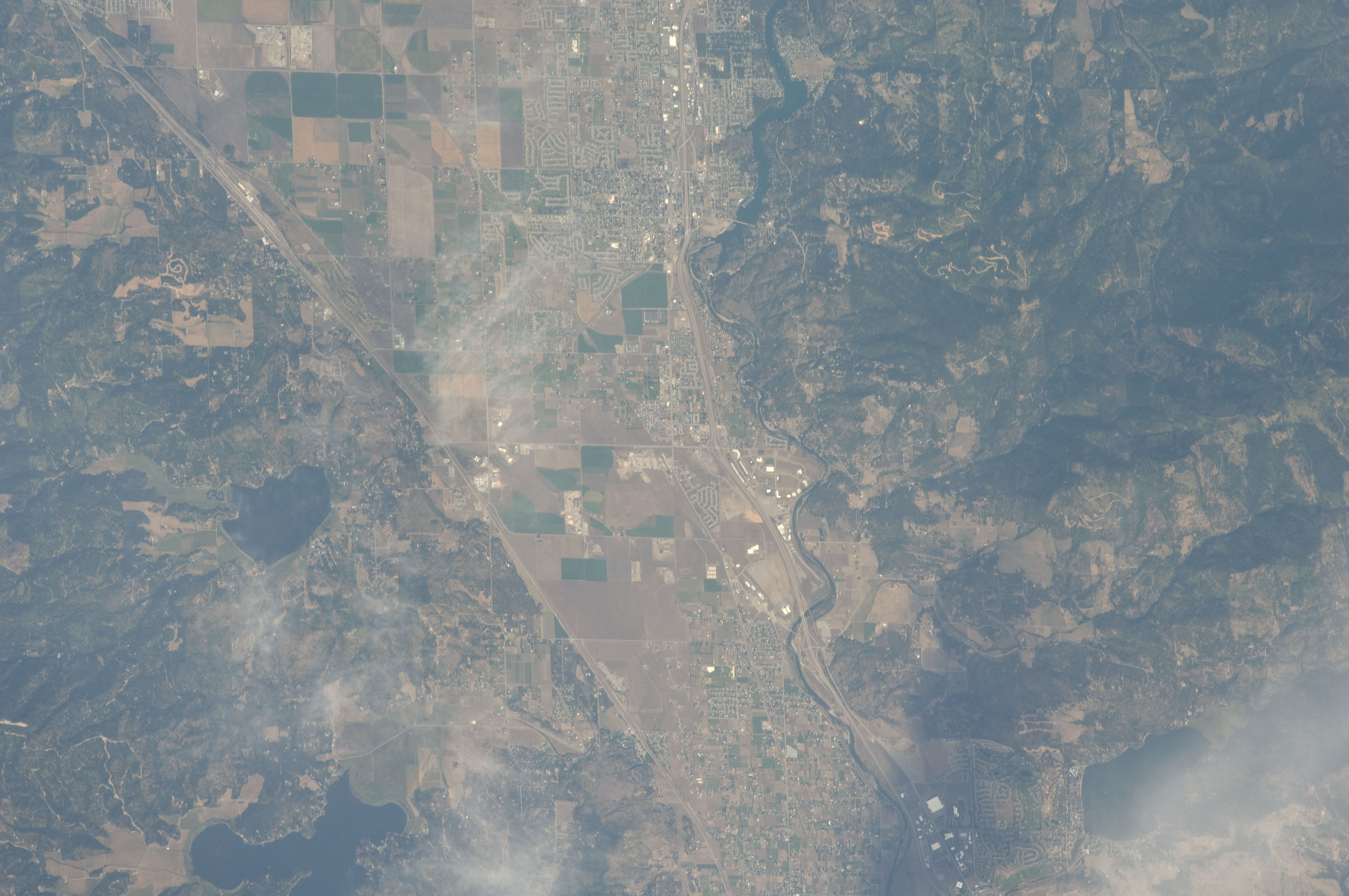
- Rathdrum Prairie from space
- Floor elevation: 2,274 ft (693 m)

Geography
- Location: Kootenai County, ID, United States
- Population centers: Coeur d'Alene, Post Falls, Hayden, Rathdrum, State Line, Huetter
- Borders on: Eightmile Prairie (North), Selkirk Range (Northwest and South), Lake Coeur d'Alene (Southeast), the Spokane Valley (west), Coeur d'Alene Mountains (Rocky Mountains); Hayden Lake (East)
- Coordinates: 47°44′13″N 116°52′40″W
- Traversed by: Interstate 90
- Rivers: Spokane River, Rathdrum Creek
- Interactive map of Rathdrum Prairie

The Rathdrum Prairie is a flat in the U.S. state of Idaho. The prairie contains the cities of Coeur d'Alene, Post Falls, Hayden, Rathdrum, State Line, and Huetter. The prairie also contains part of the Spokane Valley–Rathdrum Prairie Aquifer.

== See also ==
- Spokane Valley
