= Otis Orchards-East Farms, Washington =

- CDP
- Location of Otis Orchards-East Farms, Washington
- Coordinates: 47°41′57″N 117°06′25″W
- Country: United States
- State: Washington
- County: Spokane

Area
  - Land: 8.03 sq mi (20.8 km^{2})
- Elevation: 2,070 ft (630 m)

Population (2020)
  - Total: 6,299
  - Density: 784.3/sq mi (302.8/km^{2})
- Time zone: UTC-8 (Pacific (PST))
  - Summer (DST): UTC-7 (PDT)
- ZIP Code: 99027
- Area code: Area code 509
- FIPS code: 53-52267
- GNIS feature ID: 2409004

Otis Orchards-East Farms is a census-designated place (CDP) in Spokane County, Washington, United States, near the county's border with Idaho. The population was 6,299 at the 2020 census. The CDP includes the unincorporated communities of Otis Orchards and East Farms. Otis Orchards contains the bulk of the businesses of the community.

Otis Orchards-East Farms is north of the Spokane River from Liberty Lake, Washington and west of Rathdrum, Idaho and Stateline, Idaho. Part of Otis Orchards was recently incorporated into the new city of Spokane Valley. Otis Orchards is in the eastern part of the Spokane River valley, and is in the Spokane, Washington metro area.

== Geography ==
According to the United States Census Bureau, the CDP has a total area of 8.1 square miles (21 km^{2}), of which, 8 square miles (21 km^{2}) of it is land and 0.1 square miles (0.26 km^{2}) of it (1.23%) is water.

== Demographics ==
Historical population
Census	Pop.	Note	%±
1980	4,597		—
1990	5,811		26.4%
2000	6,318		8.7%
U.S. Decennial Census; 1970 1980 1990; 2000 2010

Otis Orchards-East Farms first appeared as a census designated place in the 1980 U.S. census.

=== 2000 census ===
As of the census of 2000, there were 6,318 people, 2,110 households, and 1,742 families residing in the CDP. The population density was 784.8 per square mile (303.0/km^{2}). There were 2,187 housing units at an average density of 271.7 per square mile (104.9/km^{2}). The racial makeup of the CDP was 95.11% White, 1.22% Native American, 1.16% Asian, 0.17% African American, 0.05% Pacific Islander, 0.51% from other races, and 1.79% from two or more races. Hispanic or Latino of any race were 1.95% of the population.

There were 2,110 households, out of which 43.6% had children under the age of 18 living with them, 67.4% were married couples living together, 10.0% had a female householder with no husband present, and 17.4% were non-families. 13.5% of all households were made up of individuals, and 3.0% had someone living alone who was 65 years of age or older. The average household size was 2.99 and the average family size was 3.27.

In the CDP, the age distribution of the population shows 31.7% under the age of 18, 6.6% from 18 to 24, 31.8% from 25 to 44, 23.5% from 45 to 64, and 6.4% who were 65 years of age or older. The median age was 35 years. For every 100 females, there were 100.6 males. For every 100 females age 18 and over, there were 99.4 males.

The median income for a household in the CDP was $46,946, and the median income for a family was $50,457. Males had a median income of $35,926 versus $24,430 for females. The per capita income for the CDP was $17,439. About 2.6% of families and 4.2% of the population were below the poverty line, including 3.0% of those under age 18 and 14.1% of those age 65 or over.

== Education ==
The community is served by the East Valley School District.
