= Post Falls, Idaho =

Post Falls
- City
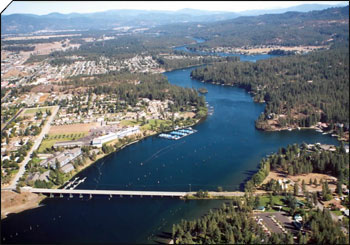
- Downtown Post Falls along the Spokane River

- Location of Post Falls in Kootenai County, Idaho
- Coordinates: 47°43′15″N 116°56′22″W
- Country: United States
- State: Idaho
- County: Kootenai
- Founded: June 1, 1871
- Incorporated: 1891

Government
  - Type: City Council (6) & Mayor elected to four-year terms

Area
  - City: 15.17 sq mi (39.29 km^{2})
  - Land: 15.14 sq mi (39.22 km^{2})
  - Water: 0.027 sq mi (0.07 km^{2})
- Elevation: 2,202 ft (671 m)

Population (2020)
  - City: 38,485
  - Estimate (2022): 44,194
  - Rank: US: 740th ID: 9th
  - Density: 2,730/sq mi (1,055/km^{2})
  - Urban: 121,831 (US: 272nd)
  - Metro: 183,578 (US: 240th)
  - Combined: 781,497 (US: 70th)
- Time zone: UTC–8 (Pacific (PST))
  - Summer (DST): UTC–7 (PDT)
- ZIP Codes: 83854, 83877
- Area codes: 208 and 986
- FIPS code: 16-64810
- GNIS feature ID: 2411475
- Website: postfalls.gov

Post Falls is a city in Kootenai County, Idaho, United States. It is the gateway city to Northern Idaho off Interstate 90, just west of Coeur d'Alene, and east of Spokane, Washington. The population is an estimated 44,194 in 2022 according to the U.S. Census Bureau estimate, making it Idaho's ninth-largest city and the second largest city in North Idaho behind Coeur d’Alene.

== History ==
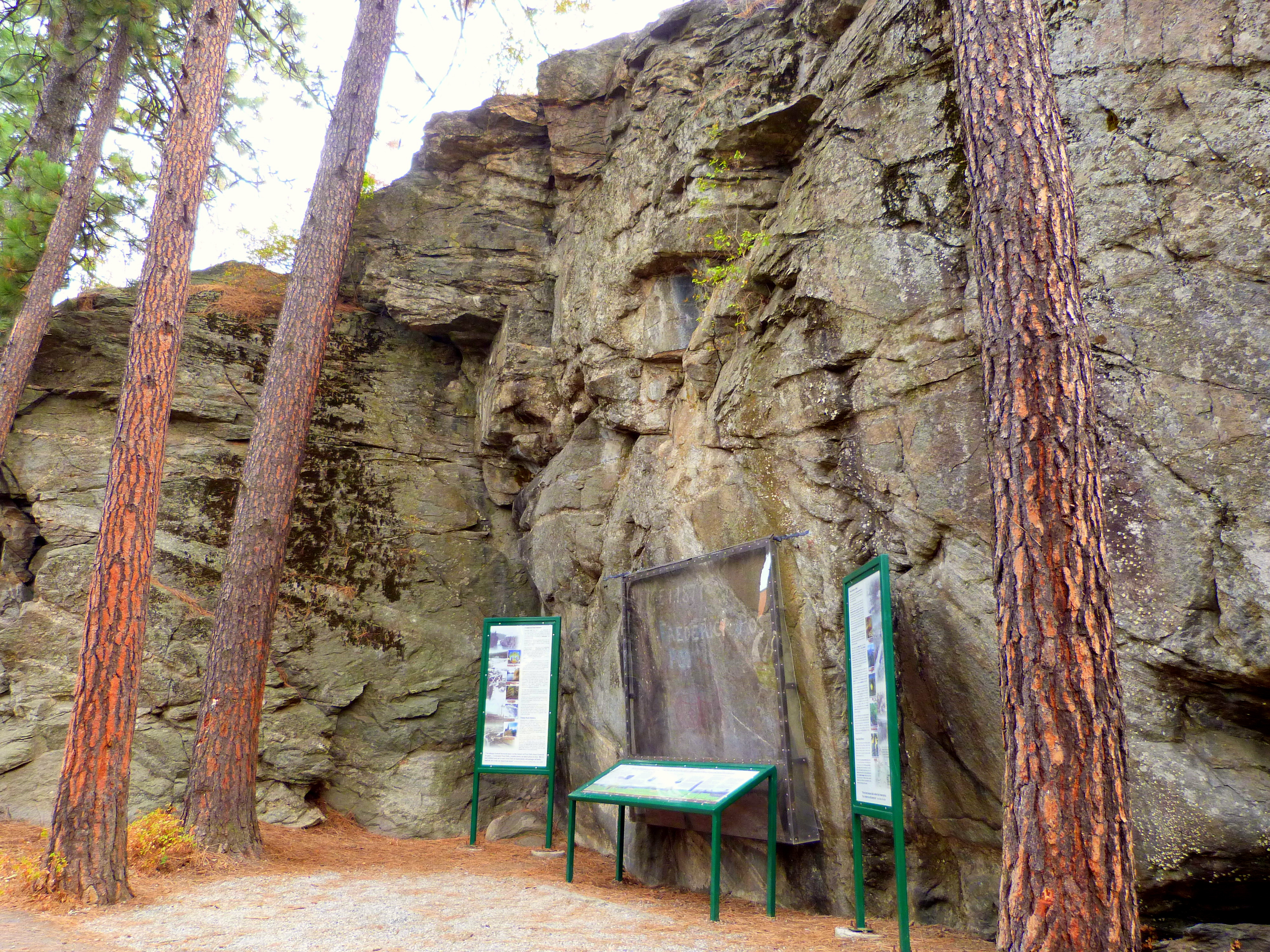
Treaty Rock

Post Falls is named after Frederick Post, a German immigrant who constructed a lumber mill along the Spokane River in 1871 on land he purchased from Andrew Seltice, Chief of the Coeur d'Alene Tribe. The purchase of the land is preserved in a pictograph on a granite cliff in Treaty Rock Park.

== Geography ==
The coordinates of Post Falls are 47.712°N 116.948°W.

According to the United States Census Bureau, the city has a total area of 14.11 square miles (36.54 km^{2}), of which 14.07 square miles (36.44 km^{2}) is land and 0.04 square miles (0.10 km^{2}) is water.

Post Falls is located on the Rathdrum Prairie, along the Washington–Idaho border. It is bounded by Coeur d’Alene to the east, Stateline and the state of Washington to the west, and the Spokane River to the south. Post Falls is 20 miles (32 km) east of Spokane and approximately 100 miles (160 km) south of the Canada–United States border. The elevation of the city is 2,182 feet (665 m) above sea level.

== Climate ==
Post Falls has a Warm-summer Mediterranean climate (Csb), with four very distinct seasons.

Climate data for Post Falls, Idaho
| Month | Jan | Feb | Mar | Apr | May | Jun | Jul | Aug | Sep | Oct | Nov | Dec | Year |
|---|---|---|---|---|---|---|---|---|---|---|---|---|---|
| Record high °F (°C) | 60 (16) | 62 (17) | 73 (23) | 94 (34) | 98 (37) | 102 (39) | 108 (42) | 109 (43) | 102 (39) | 87 (31) | 71 (22) | 60 (16) | 109 (43) |
| Mean daily maximum °F (°C) | 36 (2) | 40 (4) | 49 (9) | 56 (13) | 65 (18) | 72 (22) | 82 (28) | 82 (28) | 73 (23) | 58 (14) | 44 (7) | 34 (1) | 58 (14) |
| Mean daily minimum °F (°C) | 26 (−3) | 27 (−3) | 31 (−1) | 37 (3) | 44 (7) | 51 (11) | 56 (13) | 56 (13) | 48 (9) | 38 (3) | 32 (0) | 25 (−4) | 39 (4) |
| Record low °F (°C) | −30 (−34) | −29 (−34) | −13 (−25) | 5 (−15) | 21 (−6) | 28 (−2) | 36 (2) | 32 (0) | 17 (−8) | 2 (−17) | −13 (−25) | −26 (−32) | −30 (−34) |
| Average precipitation inches (mm) | 3.18 (81) | 2.20 (56) | 2.32 (59) | 1.88 (48) | 2.16 (55) | 1.98 (50) | 0.94 (24) | 0.87 (22) | 1.01 (26) | 1.95 (50) | 3.72 (94) | 3.52 (89) | 25.73 (654) |
| Average snowfall inches (cm) | 17.1 (43) | 8.8 (22) | 5.6 (14) | 1.0 (2.5) | 0.4 (1.0) | 0.1 (0.25) | 0.0 (0.0) | 0.0 (0.0) | 0.0 (0.0) | 0.7 (1.8) | 7.0 (18) | 18.6 (47) | 59.3 (151) |

== Education ==
The public schools are run by the Post Falls School District #273. Other schools within Post Falls include:

- Classical Christian Academy
- Frederick Post Kindergarten
- Greensferry Elementary
- Genesis Prep Academy
- Mullan Trail Elementary
- Ponderosa Elementary
- Prairie View Elementary
- Seltice Elementary
- Treaty Rock Elementary
- West Ridge Elementary
- Post Falls Middle School
- Immaculate Conception Academy
- River City Middle School
- Post Falls High School
- New Vision Alternative High School
- North Idaho College Workforce Training Center
- St. Dominic School
- Pinegrove Academy (Private)
- Elevate Academy North (Charter)

== Demographics ==
Historical population
| Census | Pop. | Note | %± |
|---|---|---|---|
| 1900 | 287 | | — |
| 1910 | 658 | | 129.3% |
| 1920 | 576 | | −12.5% |
| 1930 | 509 | | −11.6% |
| 1940 | 843 | | 65.6% |
| 1950 | 1,069 | | 26.8% |
| 1960 | 1,983 | | 85.5% |
| 1970 | 2,371 | | 19.6% |
| 1980 | 5,736 | | 141.9% |
| 1990 | 7,349 | | 28.1% |
| 2000 | 17,247 | | 134.7% |
| 2010 | 27,574 | | 59.9% |
| 2020 | 38,485 | | 39.6% |
| 2022 (est.) | 44,194 | | 14.8% |
U.S. Decennial Census; 2020 Census

=== 2020 census ===
As of the 2020 census, Post Falls had a population of 38,485.

The median age was 35.8 years. 26.2% of residents were under the age of 18 and 16.0% of residents were 65 years of age or older. For every 100 females there were 95.7 males, and for every 100 females age 18 and over there were 92.7 males age 18 and over.

99.6% of residents lived in urban areas, while 0.4% lived in rural areas.

There were 14,650 households in Post Falls, of which 35.2% had children under the age of 18 living in them. Of all households, 51.7% were married-couple households, 16.0% were households with a male householder and no spouse or partner present, and 24.4% were households with a female householder and no spouse or partner present. About 23.4% of all households were made up of individuals and 10.2% had someone living alone who was 65 years of age or older.

There were 15,355 housing units, of which 4.6% were vacant. The homeowner vacancy rate was 0.7% and the rental vacancy rate was 5.1%.

Racial composition as of the 2020 census
| Race | Number | Percent |
|---|---|---|
| White | 33,997 | 88.3% |
| Black or African American | 155 | 0.4% |
| American Indian and Alaska Native | 373 | 1.0% |
| Asian | 297 | 0.8% |
| Native Hawaiian and Other Pacific Islander | 71 | 0.2% |
| Some other race | 563 | 1.5% |
| Two or more races | 3,029 | 7.9% |
| Hispanic or Latino (of any race) | 2,358 | 6.1% |

=== 2010 census ===
As of the 2010 census, there were 27,574 people, 10,263 households, and 7,396 families living in the city. The population density was 1,959.8 inhabitants per square mile (756.7/km^{2}). There were 11,150 housing units at an average density of 792.5 per square mile (306.0/km^{2}). The racial makeup of the city was 94.0% White, 0.4% African American, 0.9% Native American, 0.7% Asian, 0.1% Pacific Islander, 1.0% from other races, and 2.8% from two or more races. Hispanic or Latino of any race were 4.6% of the population.

There were 10,263 households, of which 40.2% had children under the age of 18 living with them, 53.7% were married couples living together, 12.7% had a female householder with no husband present, 5.7% had a male householder with no wife present, and 27.9% were non-families. 21.9% of all households were made up of individuals, and 7.9% had someone living alone who was 65 years of age or older. The average household size was 2.68 and the average family size was 3.10.

The median age in the city was 33 years. 29% of residents were under the age of 18; 8.7% were between the ages of 18 and 24; 28.6% were from 25 to 44; 22.4% were from 45 to 64; and 11.3% were 65 years of age or older. The gender makeup of the city was 48.8% male and 51.2% female.

=== 2000 census ===
As of the census of 2000, there were 17,247 people, 6,369 households, and 4,668 families living in the city. The population density was 1,786.1 inhabitants per square mile (689.6/km^{2}). There were 6,697 housing units at an average density of 693.5 per square mile (267.8/km^{2}). The racial makeup of the city was 96.13% White, 0.18% African American, 0.87% Native American, 0.56% Asian, 0.06% Pacific Islander, 0.60% from other races, and 1.61% from two or more races. Hispanic or Latino of any race were 2.55% of the population.

There were 6,369 households, out of which 40.2% had children under the age of 18 living with them, 58.7% were married couples living together, 10.1% had a female householder with no husband present, and 26.7% were non-families. 20.5% of all households were made up of individuals, and 8.2% had someone living alone who was 65 years of age or older. The average household size was 2.71 and the average family size was 3.13.

In the city, the population was spread out, with 30.6% under the age of 18, 8.9% from 18 to 24, 31.8% from 25 to 44, 18.9% from 45 to 64, and 9.8% who were 65 years of age or older. The median age was 31 years. For every 100 females, there were 95.8 males. For every 100 females age 18 and over, there were 92.4 males.

The median income for a household in the city was $39,061, and the median income for a family was $42,758. Males had a median income of $32,284 versus $22,798 for females. The per capita income for the city was $18,692. About 7.1% of families and 9.4% of the population were below the poverty line, including 13.4% of those under age 18 and 7.5% of those age 65 or over.

=== American Community Survey estimates ===
As of 2023 the median household income for the city was $73,313.

| Median households income (in 2023 dollars), 2019-2023 | $73,313 |
| Per capita income in past 12 months (in 2023 dollars), 2019-2023 | $32,045 |
| Persons in poverty, percent | 13.0% |

== Economy ==
Due to the proximity of numerous lakes, rivers and mountains, Post Falls has developed tourism and retirement communities.

Kootenai County traditionally has had a timber-based economy. That is changing gradually, as the manufacturing base has become more diverse. Jobs Plus, Inc., the local economic development organization has recruited several small to medium-sized firms to the county. Manufacturing jobs are found primarily in electronics, lumber and furniture at the present. Post Falls was the chosen location for Flexcel, Inc., a major furniture manufacturer that relocated to North Idaho nearly fifteen years ago and employs a workforce of 350. This was done with the help of Jobs Plus, Inc. and by creating an Urban Renewal District to help build infrastructure. This District closed out at the end of December 2001. Jobs Plus, Inc. has also just recently helped bring Center Partners, a call center business (employing a workforce of 300), and Buck Knives brought their manufacturing headquarters (workforce of 250) to the City.

=== Top employers ===
According to the City's 2022 Comprehensive Annual Financial Report, the largest employers in the city are:

| # | Employer | Type of Business | # of Employees | Percentage |
|---|---|---|---|---|
| 1 | Post Falls School District | Public Education | 700–799 | 3.9%–4.5% |
| 2 | Pleasant View Surgery Center | Healthcare | 200–299 | 1.7%–2.2% |
| 3 | Rehabilitation Hospital of the Northwest | Healthcare | 200–299 | 1.1%–1.7% |
| 4 | North Idaho Day Surgery | Healthcare | 200–299 | 1.1%–1.7% |
| 5 | Buck Knives | Manufacturing | 200–299 | 1.1%–1.7% |
| 6 | City of Post Falls | Government | 200–299 | 1.1%–1.7% |
| 7 | Walmart | Retail | 200–299 | 1.1%–1.7% |
| 8 | Tedder Industries | Manufacturing | 150–199 | 0.8%–1.1% |
| 9 | Red Lion Hotels | Hotel | 100–149 | 0.6%–0.8% |
| 10 | All Wall Contracting | Construction | 100–199 | 0.6%–0.8% |
| — | Total employers | — | 17,884 | 13.1%–17.9% |

== Transportation ==
- - Interstate 90 - Spokane (west), Coeur d'Alene (east)

The city is served by Interstate 90, the primary east–west highway of the northern United States, which crosses the Idaho panhandle through Post Falls. Two miles (3.2 km) east is its junction with State Highway 41, which extends 8 miles (13 km) north to Rathdrum. Post Falls is approximately 7 miles (11 km) west of U.S. Route 95, the state's primary north–south highway, which extends into Canada.

Air passenger service is available at Spokane International Airport, west of Spokane. Amtrak passenger rail service is available in Spokane and Sandpoint. Bus service and taxi service are available in the immediate area.
