= Spokane Valley =

Valley in Washington, United States

- The Valley
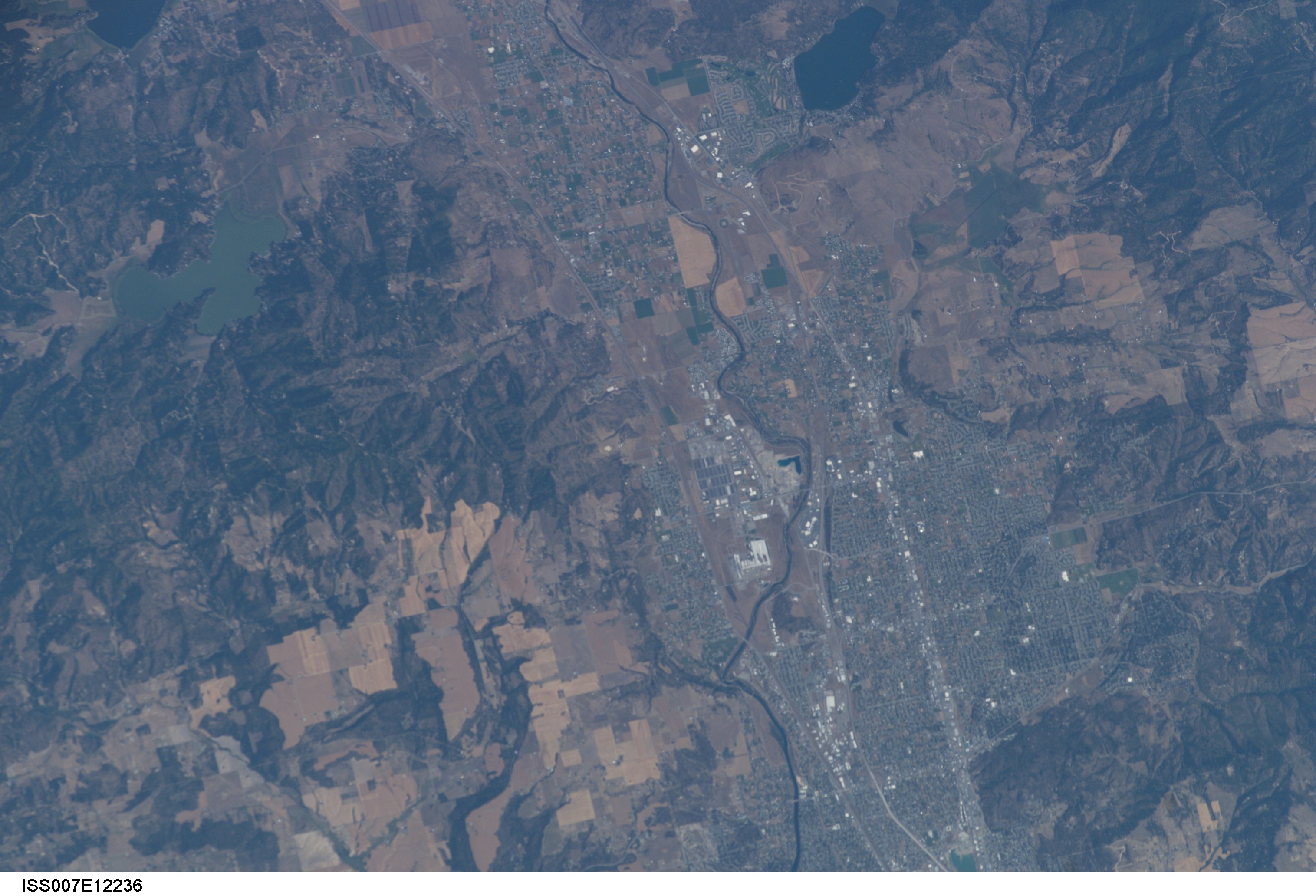
- Spokane Valley from space

- Location within Washington (state)
- Floor elevation: 1,896 ft (578 m)
- Depth: 3,309 feet (1,009 m)

Geography
- Location: Spokane County, Washington, U.S.
- Population centers: Spokane Valley; Millwood; Liberty Lake; Otis Orchards; East Farms; Spokane Bridge; Dishman; Greenacres; Opportunity; Trentwood; Veradale; Spokane
- Borders on: Spokane (west), Selkirk Range (north), Rathdrum Prairie, Idaho (east), Selkirk Range (south)
- Coordinates: 47°43′03″N 117°02′51″W
- Traversed by: Interstate 90, Washington State Route 290
- Rivers: Spokane River, Saltese Creek, Cable Creek
- Interactive map of Spokane Valley

The Spokane Valley is a valley of the Spokane River through the southern Selkirk Mountains in the U.S. state of Washington. The valley is home to the cities of Spokane and its suburbs Spokane Valley, Liberty Lake, and Millwood. The valley is bounded on the north and south by the Selkirk Mountains, on the west by the Columbia River Basalt Group, and on the east by the Rathdrum Prairie at the Idaho state border. Mica Peak, located south of the valley, is the southernmost peak in the Selkirk Range. The mountain, along with surrounding peaks, separates the Spokane Valley from the Palouse. The Valley contains part of the Spokane Valley–Rathdrum Prairie Aquifer.

== Geography ==
=== Topography ===
The valley exhibits signs of the prehistoric geologic events that shaped the area and region such as the Missoula Floods which ended 12,000 to 15,000 years ago. The Spokane valley was gouged out by repeated failures in the ice dam that held Glacial Lake Missoula. The protected Dishman Hills Natural Resources Conservation Area to the west, with its rugged, potholed appearance and deep gullies is a result of the Missoula Floods as well and represents one of the most ecologically diverse regions in Washington state, where forests, grasslands and shrublands converge and is within two ecoregions, the Okanagan and Northern Rockies ecoregions. The geography further to the southeast, such as the Saltese Flats and Saltese Uplands is characterized as a shrub–steppe landscape with grassy hills and ravines.

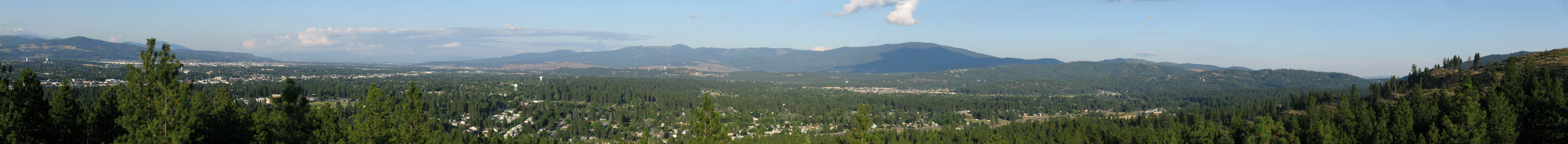
Panorama of Spokane Valley looking east from Eagle Peak

=== Climate ===
Most of the valley is classified as a Mediterranean Climate (Köppen Csa), however the western slope of the Saltese Uplands closely border on a semi-arid climate (Köppen Bsk).

== History ==
=== Early history ===
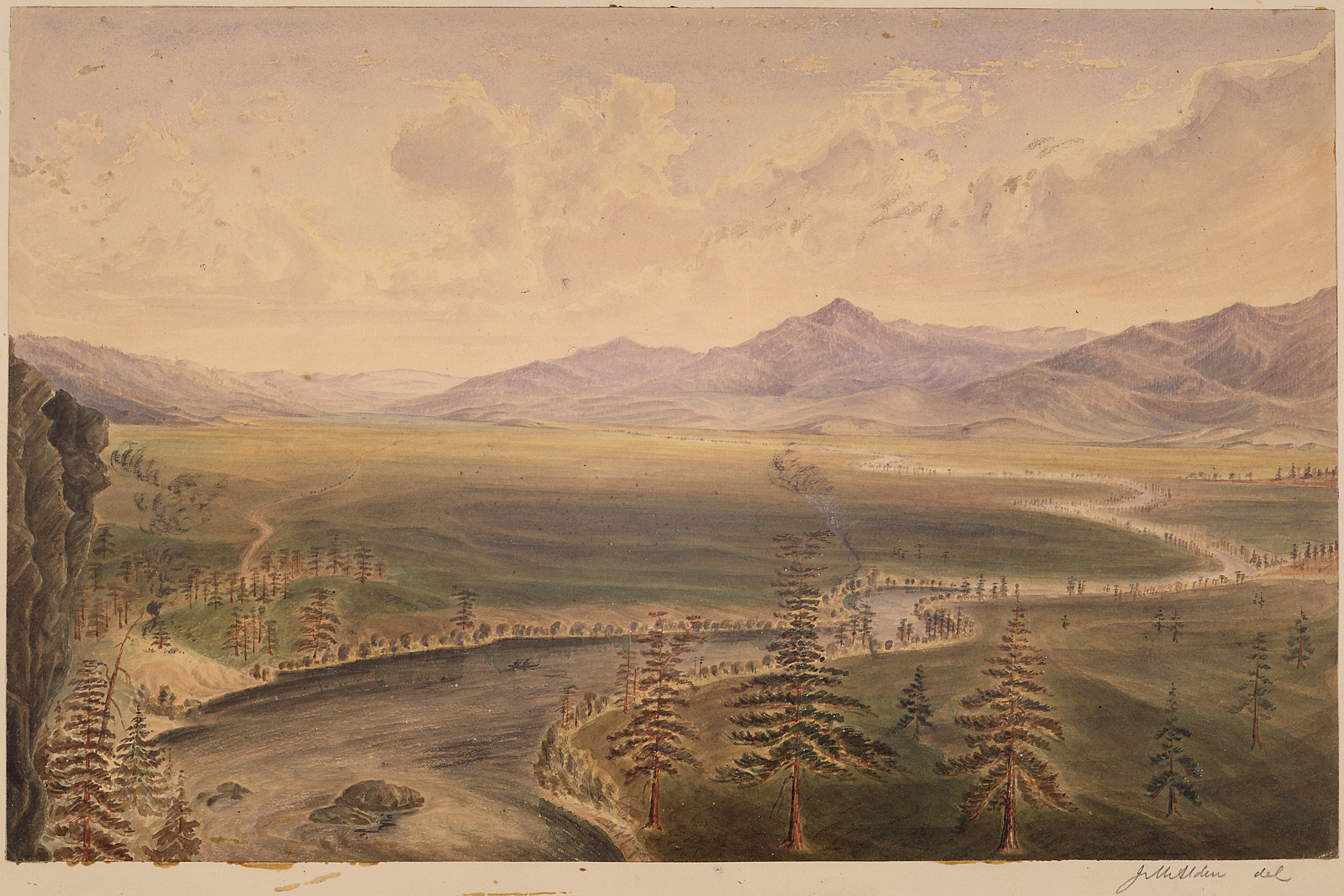
Plante's Crossing on the Spokane River

For thousands of years, native peoples lived in the Valley, and included it in their seasonal migrations, where they hunted, fished, gathered, and dug roots. Prior to European settlers, the Valley was occupied the Spokane and Coeur d’Alene people.

Starting in the early 1800s, fur traders sent by the North West Company (later merged with the Hudson's Bay Company) arrived in Spokane territory. West of the Valley, two trading posts were established near the mouth of the Little Spokane, 1810-1826 Northwest of there, missionaries established the Tshimakain Mission, 1838–1848. The first settler in the Valley was Antoine Plante, a French Canadian and Blackfoot, and his wife, Mary of the Flathead nation. He came as an employee of the Hudson's Bay Company, for which he worked for two years before becoming a Freeman. He built a small cabin near the Spokane River in 1849 (now the Plantes Ferry Recreation Park between the neighborhoods of Trentwood and Irwin), from which he ran a small Hudson's Bay Company trading post. He operated the first ferry across the Spokane River, the only means of crossing the river in the area, from 1852 to 1864.

=== Washington Territory ===
In 1853, two years after the establishment of the Washington Territory, the first governor, Isaac Stevens, made an initial effort to make a treaty with Chief Garry and the Spokanes at Antoine Plantes' cabin. In spite of the calming influence of Chief Garry, the Spokanes protested the loss of their lands by joining in the Coeur d'Alene War of 1858. The battle culminated in the Battle of Spokane Plains, while there was no decisive winner, the tribes were greatly weakened. The Spokanes were forced from the lands of their ancestors to a reservation north of the Spokane River, just west of the Spokane area.

In 1862, A. C. "Charley" Kendall established a store on the north side of the Spokane River at the far east end of the Valley. A bridge to cross the river at Kendall's store was soon built by Joe Herring, Timothy Lee, and Ned Jordan in 1864, strategically located nearer the Mullan Road than Plante's Ferry. A small community, known as Spokane Bridge, began to build up near the bridge. It boasts the first hotel and post office in the Valley. In 1871, it became a stop on the Pony Express, connecting The Dalles, Oregon Territory, to Missoula, Montana Territory.

Before the turn of the century, early pioneers, many of them silver miners, arrived from the East by way of the Northern Pacific and Great Northern railroads, for which Spokane was a major hub. By 1883, the first transcontinental rail was established. The railroad activity created support for extensive shops and facilities. Within a few years, Spokane was tied to the outside world by five transcontinental railroads, making it the hub of commerce it remains today.

=== Early 1900s ===
Irrigation efforts stimulated population growth in the Spokane Valley significantly in the early part of the 20th century. Developers and real estate speculators tapped into nearby lakes, the Spokane River and the aquifer lying under the valley in an effort to turn the dry land into saleable agricultural land. In 1899, the Spokane Valley Land and Water Co., later owned by long-time irrigation advocate D.C. Corbin, built a canal to irrigate land in the Greenacres area with water from Liberty Lake. In 1905, the Spokane Canal Company built a canal to irrigate the Otis Orchard area with water from Newman Lake, and Modern Irrigation and Land Company tapped into the underground aquifer to irrigate 3,000 acres (12 km^{2}) in Opportunity. Within just twenty years, 30,000 acres (120 km^{2}) of dry land was converted into fertile farmland. Water access greatly increased land values. Valley population grew from 1,000 residents in 1900 to nearly 10,000 by 1922. Extensive apple orchards thrived in the gravelly soil of the Valley, and by 1912 nearly 2 million apple trees had been planted. A huge packing plant was built in 1911 by the Spokane Valley Growers Union.

The Spokane Valley was developed as townships. In 1908, the state granted the formation of county townships as semi-autonomous, self-governing bodies, with the same basic governing rights as most municipalities, including the ability to levy property taxes. Only Spokane and Whatcom counties took full advantage of these townships with taxing capabilities, essentially reducing the need to incorporate rural communities. These townships fulfilled the basic needs for services in the rural districts until the State revoked their taxing rights in 1969, after which the unfunded townships declined until the Spokane County voted to disorganize them in 1974. The Valley townships were East Spokane, Opportunity and Greenacres, the southern edge of Pleasant Prairie, Foothills, and Newman, and the northern edge of Chester.

A few Spokane Valley towns developed for residential and/or business purposes. Trent (now Irwin) was originally platted as a residential area for Northern Pacific railroad workers in 1881. Millwood (originally Woodward) began as a "company town", developed by Inland Empire Paper Mill for their employees, and Dishman developed primarily as a business center. All other Valley townships were developed as irrigation districts and owe their existence to their agricultural roots. Between 1901 and 1915, the communities of Orchard Avenue, Greenacres, Otis Orchards, Opportunity, Vera, Dishman, Liberty Lake, Newman Lake, East Spokane, Mica and Chester were platted. Pasadena Park is a populated place located in Spokane County at latitude 47.697 and longitude -117.283, North of Millwood across the Spokane River that existed at least as early as 1916.

The Spokane Valley was promoted as a wonderful place to live. Though most Valley residents were farmers or orchardists, canneries, brickyards, railroad maintenance facilities and lumber mills provided jobs for many. The beauty of the surrounding area, pleasant communities, fertile farmlands, business opportunities, outdoor sports and activities, local recreational areas and community organizations caused it to be called "Spokane Valley, the Valley Bountiful". As the population increased, small communities with schools, churches, businesses, community clubs and organizations thrived. Tied to Spokane, local lakes and Coeur d’Alene by railroads and bus systems, the people of the Valley enjoyed a full life.

In the years that followed, crop troubles and irrigation system maintenance problems prompted many residents to sell their farms in five, ten, or 20-acre (81,000 m^{2}) plots for suburban home sites. Many of the apple trees were pulled out and replaced by neighborhoods and truck farms. The truck farms were successful in raising strawberries, raspberries, tomatoes, beans, peas, watermelons, asparagus, squash, cucumbers and thousands of acres of Heart of Gold cantaloupes. Dairy, poultry and fur farms also appeared in the Valley during these years.

=== 1930s to 1950s ===
While jobs were scarce during the Great Depression, most people in the Spokane Valley had enough land to grow food for their families. The Spokane Valley Chamber of Commerce adhered to a positive agenda throughout these hard times. They placed street signs on Valley roads and in an effort to show solidarity with Spokane, east–west roads were renamed to correspond with Spokane's roads. Observing that fires were a constant and catastrophic problem for area residents, the Chamber lobbied to begin a fire protection district in the Valley. Their efforts were successful and Valley residents were first offered fire protection in 1940, with the formation of Spokane County Fire Protection District Number One.

Spokane University, a four-year liberal arts college operated in the Spokane Valley from 1913 to 1933. when it closed due to financial difficulties amid the Great Depression. It briefly reopened as Spokane Valley Junior College, before facilities were moved to Spokane's South Hill and merged into the newly formed Spokane Junior College in 1935. The campus of Spokane University was eventually used by University High School from 1962 until 2002, when it relocated to new facilities. The campus has been occupied by Valley Christian School since 2005.

The people of the valley always maintained independence from the City of Spokane on its borders. The first local newspaper, The Spokane Valley Herald, was launched in 1920. In 1919 an early municipal airfield was carved out, later named Felts Field in honor of Herald owner Buell Felts who died in a plane crash there. A streetcar line was started as early as 1908, and later extended to Liberty Lake in the east part of the valley, where entertainment facilities were built for music and outdoor gatherings. Other than Millwood, which incorporated in 1927 and Liberty Lake, Washington which did so in 2001, the Valley remained unincorporated throughout the 20th century.

Industry began to replace agriculture more rapidly after the completion of Grand Coulee Dam in 1941, which combined cheap electricity with readily available water from the Spokane River and the extensive aquifer which underlies the Valley. At its height, the Valley was the site for an aluminum plant, a cement plant and a paper mill. Plans to attract light industry through the establishment of an industrial park at a former military depot were not very successful. The cement plant closed in the 1950s, but the paper mill and aluminum plant remain.

In the 1950s a further transformation swept the valley as the post World War II population boom began to push into the valley, replacing most of the remaining apple orchards with tracts of houses. The first shopping mall was built at University Village on Sprague Avenue (formerly called Appleway), which became the major artery through the Valley, lined with stores and restaurants. The last large-scale orchard irrigations ended in the late 1950s, canvas pipes running down residential streets replacing the old ditches by that time.

=== Last half of 20th century ===
In the later decades of the last century, the Valley experienced a large influx of retirees due to inexpensive housing and the relatively dry weather. Retirement complexes and apartment blocks began to appear. At the present time the Valley remains principally a suburban area, a mixture of families and retirees and the retail commerce to support them. In the 1990s and the early part of the twenty-first century the Spokane Valley continued to grow more urban, becoming one of the fastest growing regions in the state. Commercial growth increased and joined residential growth as it moved towards the state line. The urban development included the opening of the long-awaited Spokane Valley Mall in 1997, the establishment of dozens of other businesses along business corridors, and the development of the Mirabeau Point community complex.

== Cities, Towns, and Communities ==
- City of Spokane Valley
- Millwood
- Otis Orchards and East Farms
- Liberty Lake
- Greenacres
- Pasadena Park
- Moab
- Chnak'Wa'qn Breaks

== Protected Natural Areas ==
- Dishman Hills Natural Resources Conservation Area
- Saltese Flats and adjacent Saltese Uplands Conservation Area
- Spokane River Centennial Trail with Myrtle Point Conservation, Mirabeau Park, and Gateway Conservation Area
- Liberty Lake Conservation Area
- Cedar Grove Conservation Area
- Antoine Peak Conservation Area
- McKenzie Conservation Area and Hauser Conservation Area

== See also ==
- Rathdrum Prairie
- Silver Valley
- Treasure Valley
