= Mica, Washington =

Unincorporated community in Washington, United States

- Unincorporated community
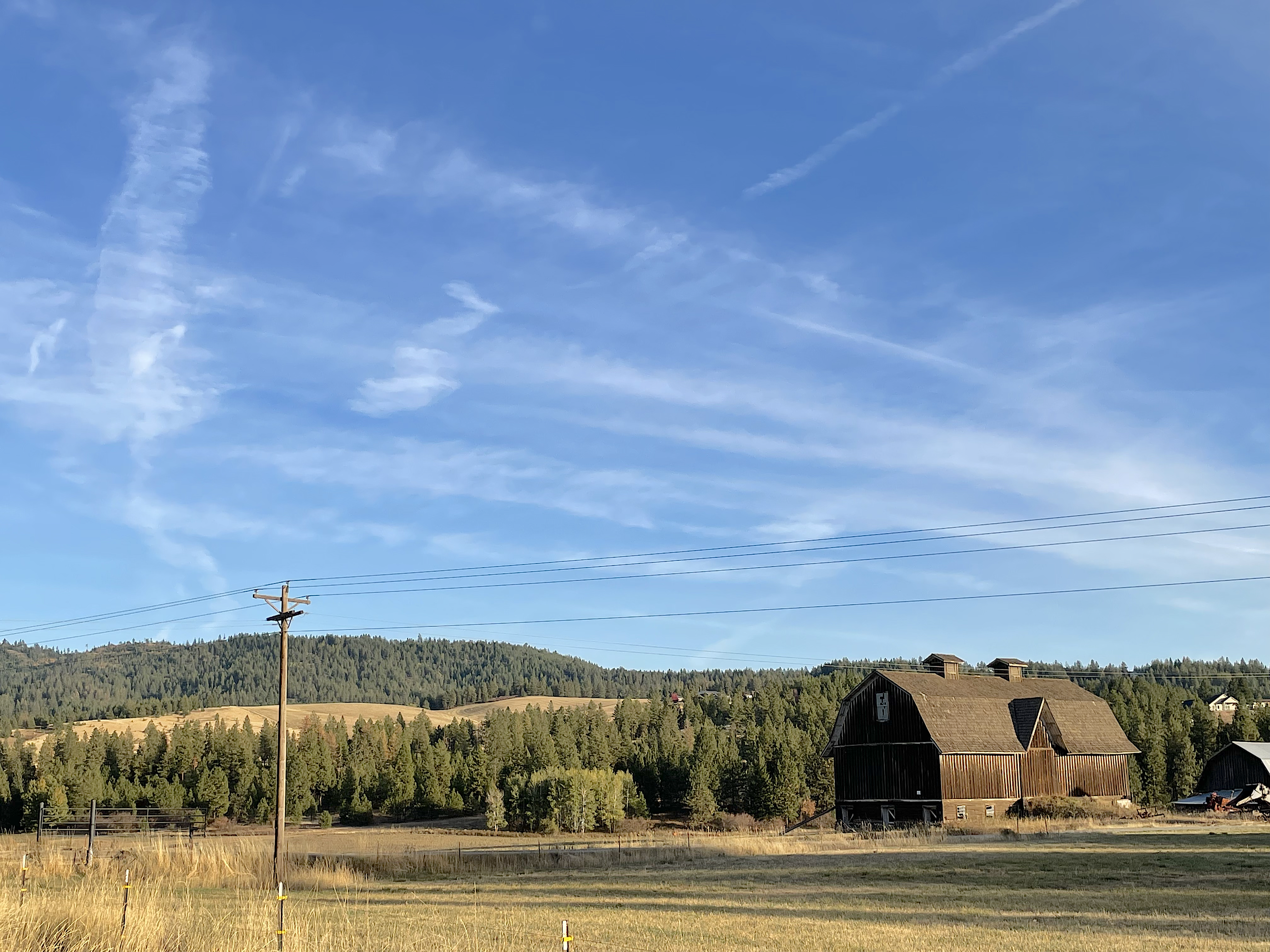

- Location within Washington (state)
- Coordinates: 47°33′22″N 117°12′44″W
- Country: United States
- State: Washington
- County: Spokane
- Elevation: 2,480 ft (760 m)

Population
  - Total: 563
- Time zone: UTC-8 (Pacific (PST))
  - Summer (DST): UTC-7 (PDT)
- ZIP code: 99023
- Area code: 509
- GNIS feature ID: 1512460

Mica is an unincorporated community in Spokane County, Washington, United States. Mica is located along State Route 27 12 miles (19 km) southeast of downtown Spokane. Mica had a post office with ZIP code 99023.

== History ==
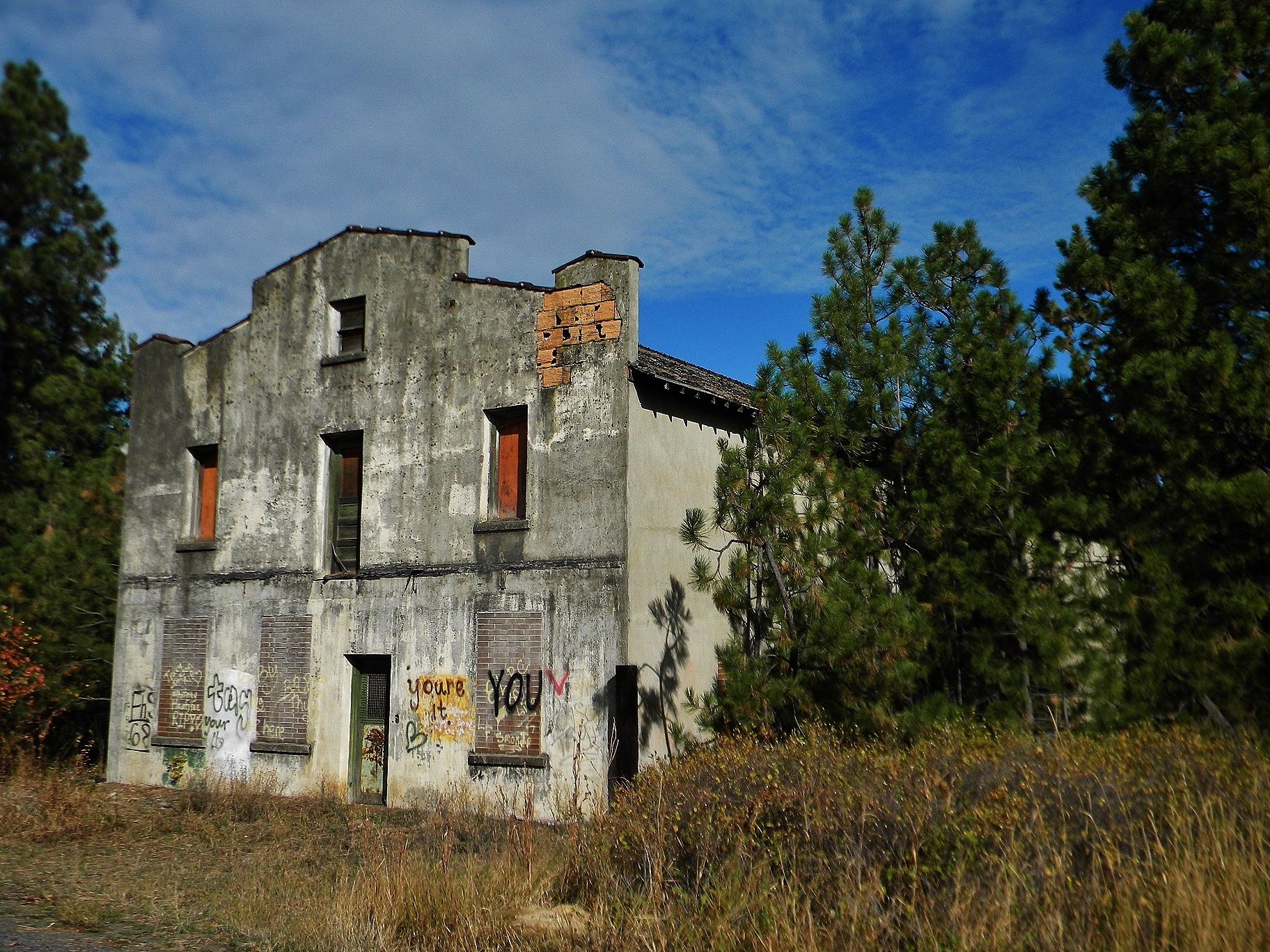
Abandoned building on the American Firebrick Company brickyard in Mica

A post office called Mica was established in 1887, and remained in operation until it was discontinued in 1975. The community was named for deposits of mica.

Mica's economy has been dominated by brick making since the town's early days. The current factory is owned by Mutual Materials and located on the site of American Fire Brick, founded by Mica pioneers the late 1800s. The American Firebrick Company campus was added to the National Register of Historic Places in 1982.

The oldest grave in Mica Cemetery dates to 1883.

Due to its location about ten minutes by car from suburban Spokane Valley, Mica and the surrounding area have lost some of their completely rural identity as people have moved in and transformed it somewhat into a bedroom community.

== Geography ==
Mica is located along State Route 27 which connects the town with Spokane Valley, a few miles to the north, and the rest of the Spokane area. To the south, State Route 27 connects Mica with numerous other small towns on the Palouse. Mica itself is located on the northern edge of the Palouse farming region, with its gentle rolling hills quickly giving way to the foothills of the Selkirk Mountains. Krell Hill, known locally as Tower Mountain for the television towers it houses, is located just to the northwest of town and Mica Peak just to the east. California Creek, a tributary of Latah Creek, flows from the slopes of Mica Peak and along the southeastern edge of town.

Mica is located in the Freeman School District, with elementary, middle and high schools located a three miles south of the town on State Route 27.

Mica sits in the transition zone between three ecoregions as defined by the World Wildlife Fund, giving the area traits from all three. The Okanagan dry forests ecoregion begins just down State Route 27 at Freeman and stretches northwest through Spokane, the Okanagan, and into the Thompson Plateau of British Columbia. Tall ponderosa pine trees are a remnant of the nature of the ecoregion prior to development of the community and agriculture. The Okanagan dry forests transition into the North Central Rockies forests as the land climbs up the slopes of the Selkirk Mountains immediately to the north and east. A couple of miles to the south of Mica, at Freeman, the Okanagan dry forests transition into the rolling, grassy hills of Palouse grasslands ecoregion.

== Gallery ==
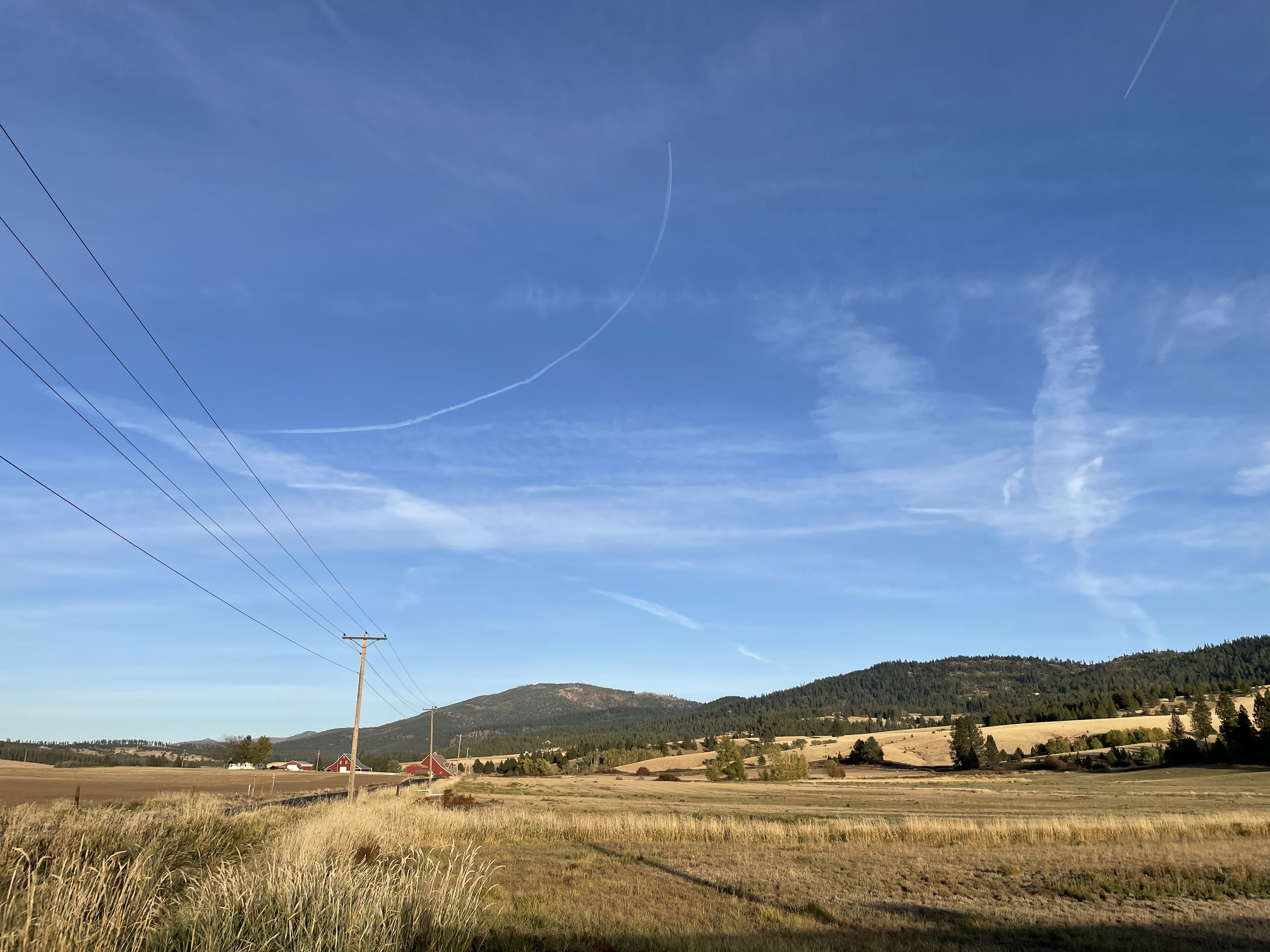
Mica Peak as seen from the eastern edge of Mica from Belmont Road.

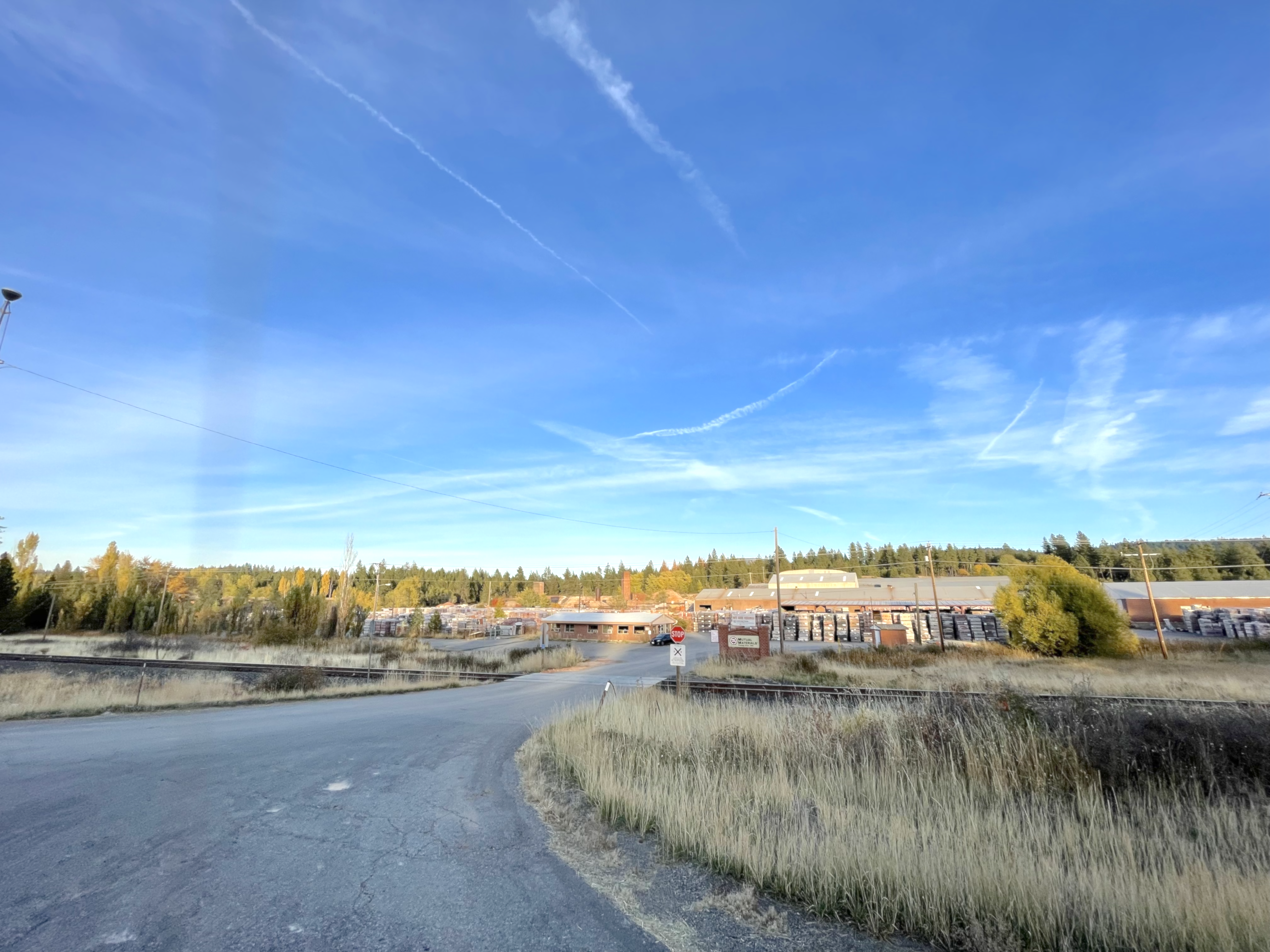
Brickyard in Mica, where bricks have been made since 1902, as seen from Washington State Route 27.
