= Huetter, Idaho =

- City of Huetter
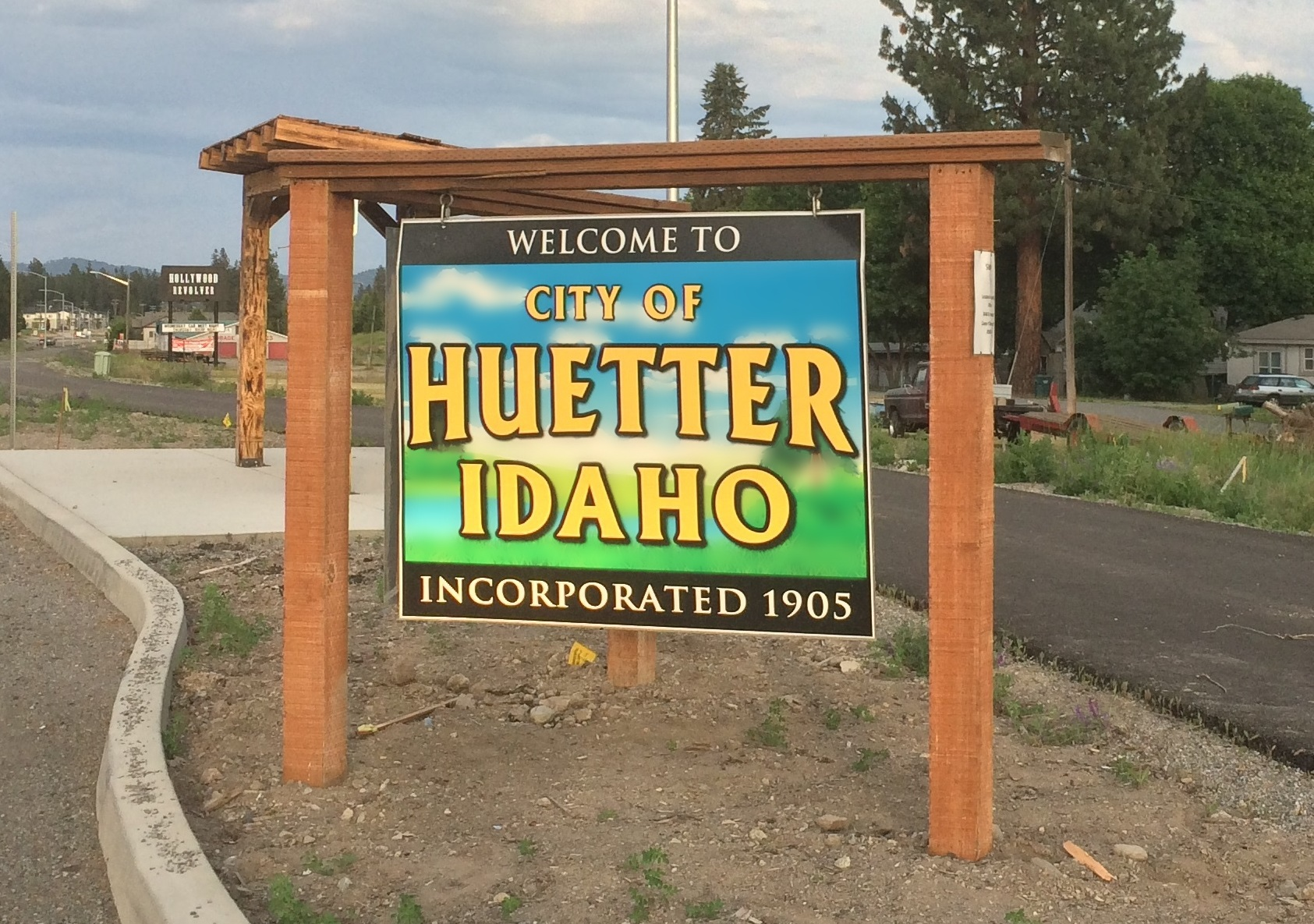
- Welcome sign (partially blurred due to copyright)

- Location of Huetter in Kootenai County, Idaho.

- Location in the United States
- Coordinates: 47°42′13″N 116°51′03″W
- Country: United States
- State: Idaho
- County: Kootenai
- Incorporated: 1905
- Founder: John Theodore Huetter

Area
  - Total: 0.046 sq mi (0.12 km^{2})
  - Land: 0.046 sq mi (0.12 km^{2})
  - Water: 0 sq mi (0.00 km^{2})
- Elevation: 2,146 ft (654 m)

Population (2020)
  - Total: 104
  - Density: 2,469.4/sq mi (953.43/km^{2})
- Time zone: UTC-8 (Pacific (PST))
  - Summer (DST): UTC-7 (PDT)
- Area code: 208
- FIPS code: 16-39070
- GNIS feature ID: 2410802

Huetter is a city in Kootenai County, Idaho, United States. The population was 104 at the 2020 census.

== Geography ==
According to the United States Census Bureau, the city has a total area of 0.04 square miles (26 acres; 0.10 km^{2}), all land. This makes Huetter the smallest incorporated city in the United States in terms of area.

== Mayoral controversy ==
Bradley Keene and Jennifer Brown were among a group of young people who attempted a takeover of Huetter by running for mayor and city councilor, respectively, in 2007. Keene was elected, ousting longtime mayor Jackie Meeks, as was Brown; just 32 people voted in the election.

However, a District judge ruled in May 2008 that Keene and Brown were ineligible to serve their term because the county had kicked them off voter registration rolls earlier in the year, a result of them not responding to challenges of their Huetter residency during the election. Keene then appealed the decision. In the ensuing two years Huetter had no official mayor, due to the litigation over the position; however, Keene had been serving as acting mayor since being elected to the city council in 2009.

Finally, in 2010, the Idaho Supreme Court ruled that the District Court had misinterpreted state statute in concluding that Keene's and Brown's positions became vacant when their voter registration was temporarily canceled after their election. The opinion reversed the removal of Keene and Brown (who later moved out of Huetter, and her council position was filled). Keene was re-elected mayor in 2011, running unopposed.

== Demographics ==
Historical population
| Census | Pop. | Note | %± |
|---|---|---|---|
| 1950 | 84 | | — |
| 1960 | 114 | | 35.7% |
| 1970 | 49 | | −57.0% |
| 1980 | 65 | | 32.7% |
| 1990 | 82 | | 26.2% |
| 2000 | 96 | | 17.1% |
| 2010 | 100 | | 4.2% |
| 2020 | 104 | | 4.0% |
| 2019 (est.) | 112 | | 12.0% |
U.S. Decennial Census

=== 2010 census ===
As of the census of 2010, there were 100 people, 42 households, and 22 families residing in the city. The population density was 3,333.3 inhabitants per square mile (1,287.0/km^{2}). There were 48 housing units at an average density of 1,600.0 units per square mile (617.8 units/km^{2}). The racial makeup of the city was 88.0% White, 1.0% African American, 3.0% Native American, 1.0% Asian, and 7.0% from two or more races. Hispanic or Latino of any race were 7.0% of the population.

There were 42 households, of which 26.2% had children under the age of 18 living with them, 28.6% were married couples living together, 14.3% had a female householder with no husband present, 9.5% had a male householder with no wife present, and 47.6% were non-families. 38.1% of all households were made up of individuals. The average household size was 2.14 and the average family size was 2.55.

The median age in the city was 39.5 years. 14% of residents were under the age of 18; 8% were between the ages of 18 and 24; 38% were from 25 to 44; 32% were from 45 to 64; and 8% were 65 years of age or older. The gender makeup of the city was 55.0% male and 45.0% female.

=== 2000 census ===
As of the census of 2000, there were 96 people, 37 households, and 21 families residing in the city. The population density was 9,044.4 inhabitants per square mile (3,492.1/km^{2}). There were 39 housing units at an average density of 3,674.3 units per square mile (1,418.7 units/km^{2}). The racial makeup of the city was 87.50% White, 2.08% Native American, 3.12% from other races, and 7.29% from two or more races. Hispanic or Latino of any race were 3.12% of the population.

There were 37 households, out of which 29.7% had children under the age of 18 living with them, 35.1% were married couples living together, 8.1% had a female householder with no husband present, and 43.2% were non-families. 27.0% of all households were made up of individuals, and 5.4% had someone living alone who was 65 years of age or older. The average household size was 2.59 and the average family size was 2.62.

In the city, the population was spread out, with 19.8% under the age of 18, 21.9% from 18 to 24, 34.4% from 25 to 44, 17.7% from 45 to 64, and 6.3% who were 65 years of age or older. The median age was 30 years. For every 100 females, there were 134.1 males. For every 100 females age 18 and over, there were 148.4 males.

The median income for a household in the city was $21,250, and the median income for a family was $22,083. Males had a median income of $28,750 versus $51,250 for females. The per capita income for the city was $9,121. There were 23.8% of families and 30.9% of the population living below the poverty line, including 36.8% of under eighteens and none of those over 64.
