= Spokane Bridge, Washington =

Unincorporated community in Washington, United States

Spokane Bridge Hnts'aq'iłpench
- Unincorporated Community
- Coordinates: 47°41′36″N 117°02′49″W
- Country: United States
- State: Washington
- County: Spokane County
- Founded: 1862
- Founder: A. C. "Charley" Kendall
- Named for: The first bridge over the Spokane River

Population
  - Estimate (2010): 26
- Time zone: UTC-8 (PST)
  - Summer (DST): UTC-7 (PDT)
- ZIP code: 99019
- Area code: 509
- GNIS feature ID: 1508596

Spokane Bridge is an unincorporated community and former census-designated place in Spokane County, in the U.S. state of Washington. The community is located on the banks of the Spokane River at the Washington–Idaho border, just south of Interstate 90. The city of Stateline, Idaho is located across the river to the northeast. The community was the site of the first post office in Spokane County

== History ==
In 1864, Joe Herring, Timothy Lee, and Ned Jordan built the first bridge over the Spokane River and called it the Pioneer Bridge. The bridge was built about nine miles (14 km) east of the heavily used Plante's Ferry, and subsequently people began using the bridge instead of the ferry because it cost less and was closer to the famous Mullan Road.

The first settlement in the region, which came to be known as Spokane Bridge, began to build up near the bridge, and included the first store, the first house, the first hotel, and the first post office in the region. M. M. Cowley bought out Charley Kendall in 1872, after AC Kendall became sick, which included the bridge, a store and other out buildings totaling 13. Kendall also had about 130 head of cattle at the time.

== Demographics ==
Historical population
Census	Pop.	Note	%±
1870	29		—
1880	45		55.2%
1920	100		—
2010 (est.)	26
U.S. Census
