= Stateline, Idaho =

Stateline
- City
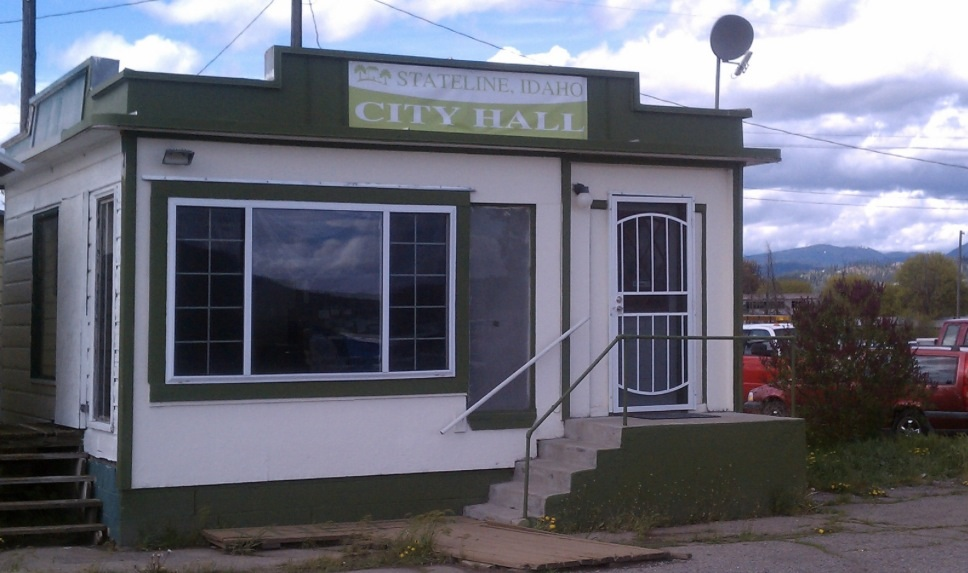
- Former City Hall

- Location of Stateline in Kootenai County, Idaho
- Coordinates: 47°42′19″N 117°02′13″W
- Country: United States
- State: Idaho
- County: Kootenai
- Incorporated: 1947

Area
  - Total: 0.11 sq mi (0.29 km^{2})
  - Land: 0.11 sq mi (0.29 km^{2})
  - Water: 0 sq mi (0.00 km^{2})
- Elevation: 2,106 ft (642 m)

Population (2020)
  - Total: 39
  - Estimate (2022): 39
  - Density: 354/sq mi (136.7/km^{2})
- Time zone: UTC–8 (Pacific (PST))
  - Summer (DST): UTC–7 (PDT)
- ZIP Code: 83854
- Area codes: 208 and 986
- FIPS code: 16-77050
- GNIS feature ID: 2411974

Stateline, officially the City of State Line, and historically known as State Line Village, is a city in Kootenai County, Idaho, United States, and is both the easternmost suburb of Spokane, Washington and the westernmost suburb of Coeur d'Alene, Idaho. The population was 39 at the 2020 census. The city is known for the adult services it provides which attract business from nearby Spokane and Coeur d'Alene. The unincorporated community of Spokane Bridge, Washington is located across the Spokane River to the southwest.

== History ==
Stateline, located along the former route of U.S. Route 10, was incorporated in 1947 so that it could sell liquor and have slot machines. It had a population of 137 at the time.

== Geography ==
According to the United States Census Bureau, the city has a total area of 0.10 square miles (0.26 km^{2}), all land.

== Demographics ==
Historical population
Census	Pop.	Note	%±
1950	52		—
1960	33		−36.5%
1970	22		−33.3%
1980	26		18.2%
1990	26		0.0%
2000	28		7.7%
2010	38		35.7%
2020	39		2.6%
2022 (est.)	39		0.0%
U.S. Decennial Census; 2020 Census

=== 2010 census ===
As of the census of 2010, there were 38 people in 20 households, including 9 families, in the city. The population density was 380.0 inhabitants per square mile (146.7/km^{2}). There were 21 housing units at an average density of 210.0 per square mile (81.1/km^{2}). The racial makup of the city was 100.0% White.

Of the 20 households 25.0% had children under the age of 18 living with them, 20.0% were married couples living together, 15.0% had a female householder with no husband present, 10.0% had a male householder with no wife present, and 55.0% were non-families. 40.0% of households were one person and 20% were one person aged 65 or older. The average household size was 1.90 and the average family size was 2.56.

The median age was 41.5 years. 23.7% of residents were under the age of 18; 0.0% were between the ages of 18 and 24; 34.2% were from 25 to 44; 15.8% were from 45 to 64; and 26.3% were 65 or older. The gender makeup of the city was 55.3% male and 44.7% female.

=== 2000 census ===
As of the census of 2000, there were 28 people, 11 households and 5 families residing in the city. The population density was 449.9 inhabitants per square mile (173.7/km^{2}). There were 12 housing units at an average density of 192.8 per square mile (74.4/km^{2}). The racial makup of the village was 85.71% White, 3.57% Native American, 7.14% from other races, and 3.57% from two or more races. Hispanic or Latino of any race were 10.71%.

Of the 11 households 45.5% had children under the age of 18 living with them, 27.3% were married couples living together, 9.1% had a female householder with no husband present, and 54.5% were non-families. 27.3% of households were one person and none had someone living alone who was 65 or older. The average household size was 2.55 and the average family size was 3.40.

The age distribution was 32.1% under the age of 18, 10.7% from 18 to 24, 42.9% from 25 to 44, and 14.3% from 45 to 64. The median age was 30 years. For every 100 females, there were 211.1 males. For every 100 females age 18 and over, there were 137.5 males.

The median household income was $46,250 and the median family income was $23,750. Males had a median income of $30,938 versus $20,833 for females. The per capita income for the city was $16,758. There were no families and 26.3% of the population living below the poverty line, including no under eighteens and none of those over 64.

== See also ==
- List of cities in Idaho
