= Saltese =

Saltese or Seltice can refer to:

- Saltese, Montana
- Saltese Mountain, a mountain in Mineral County, Montana
- Saltese Uplands, shrub-steppe conservation area in Spokane County, Washington
- Saltese Flats, wetland in Spokane County, Washington
- Saltese Creek, creek that runs through the Saltese Flats
- Chief Andrew Seltice, Coeur d'Alene chief who sold the land to create Post Falls, Idaho
