= Liberty Lake (Washington) =

Lake in Washington state, US

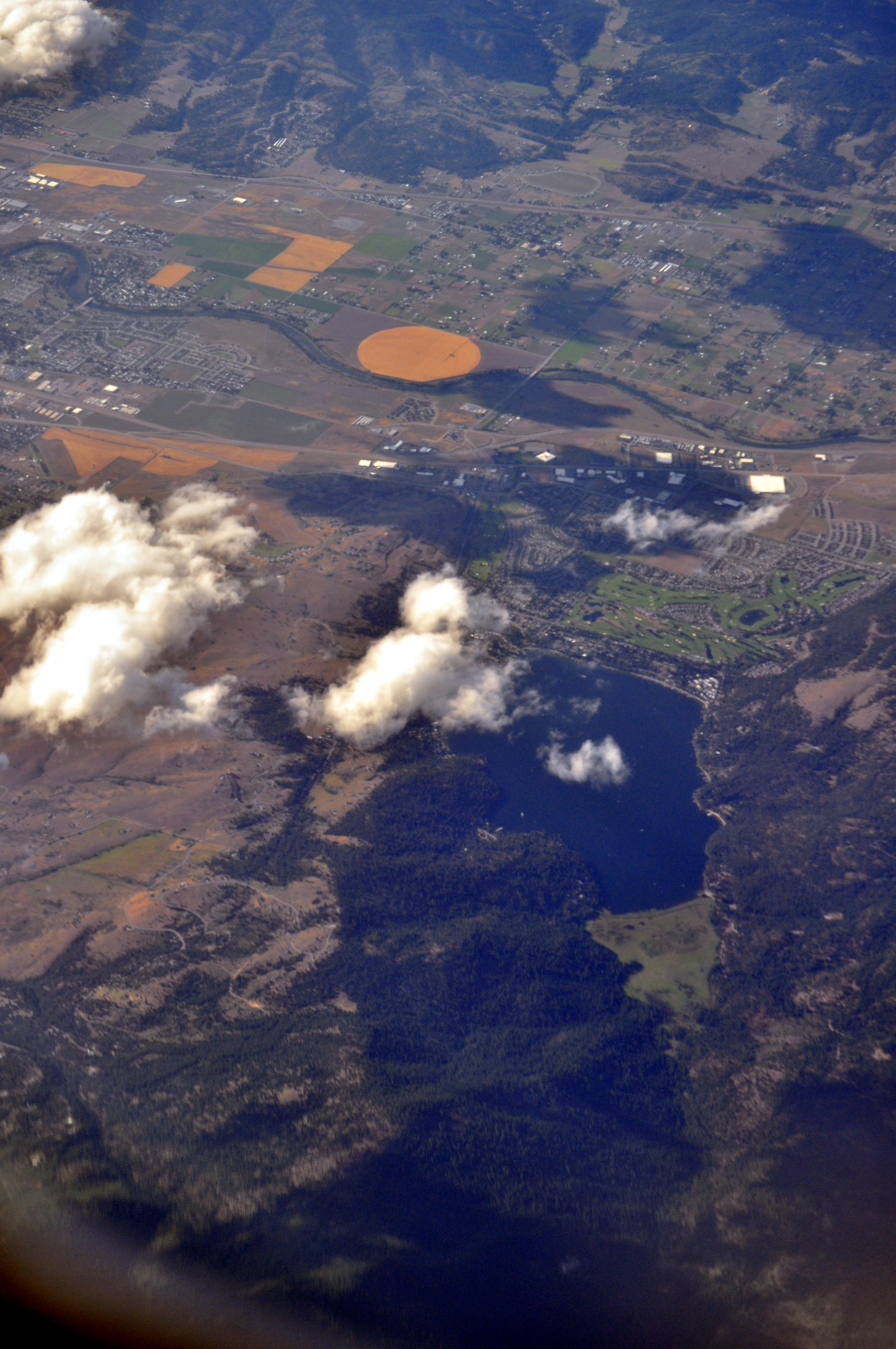
- Aerial view of Liberty Lake

- Location within Washington (state) Location within the United States
- Coordinates: 47°38′43″N 117°04′41″W
- Lake type: open lake
- Primary inflows: Liberty Creek
- Primary outflows: Unnamed Creek; Spokane Valley–Rathdrum Prairie Aquifer
- Basin countries: United States
- Surface area: 1.1 sq mi (2.9 km^{2})
- Average depth: 25 ft (7.6 m)
- Max. depth: 30 ft (9.1 m)
- Residence time: 3 Years
- Shore length^{1}: 4.4 miles (7.1 km)
- Surface elevation: 2,053 feet (626 m)
- Islands: 1
- ^{1} Shore length is not a well-defined measure.

Liberty Lake during the 2022-2023 winter season looking north from the south. The city can be seen on the opposite shoreline, and Mount Spokane is visible in the distance.

Liberty Lake is a lake located in Spokane County, Washington, in the United States. The lake is approximately 800 feet (240 m) south of the eponymous city, and is a popular fishing spot. The lake forms part of the Spokane Valley–Rathdrum Prairie Aquifer. Besides the aquifer, the only outflow is a small unnamed stream that ends at a small ephemeral pond a little over 1 mile (1.9 km) to the north.

== Native fish species ==
Liberty lake has a fishing season that lasts from March 1 to October 31. Early fishing in the month of March yields good results for the elusive brown trout. As the water warms, other fish such as the largemouth and smallmouth bass, and yellow perch become more prevalent. Other fish dwelling in the lake include black crappie, bluegill, brown bullhead, channel catfish, rainbow trout, and walleye.

== See also ==
- Lake Saltese
- Shelley Lake
- Lake Coeur d'Alene
