= Newman Lake =

Lake in Spokane County, Washington, U.S.

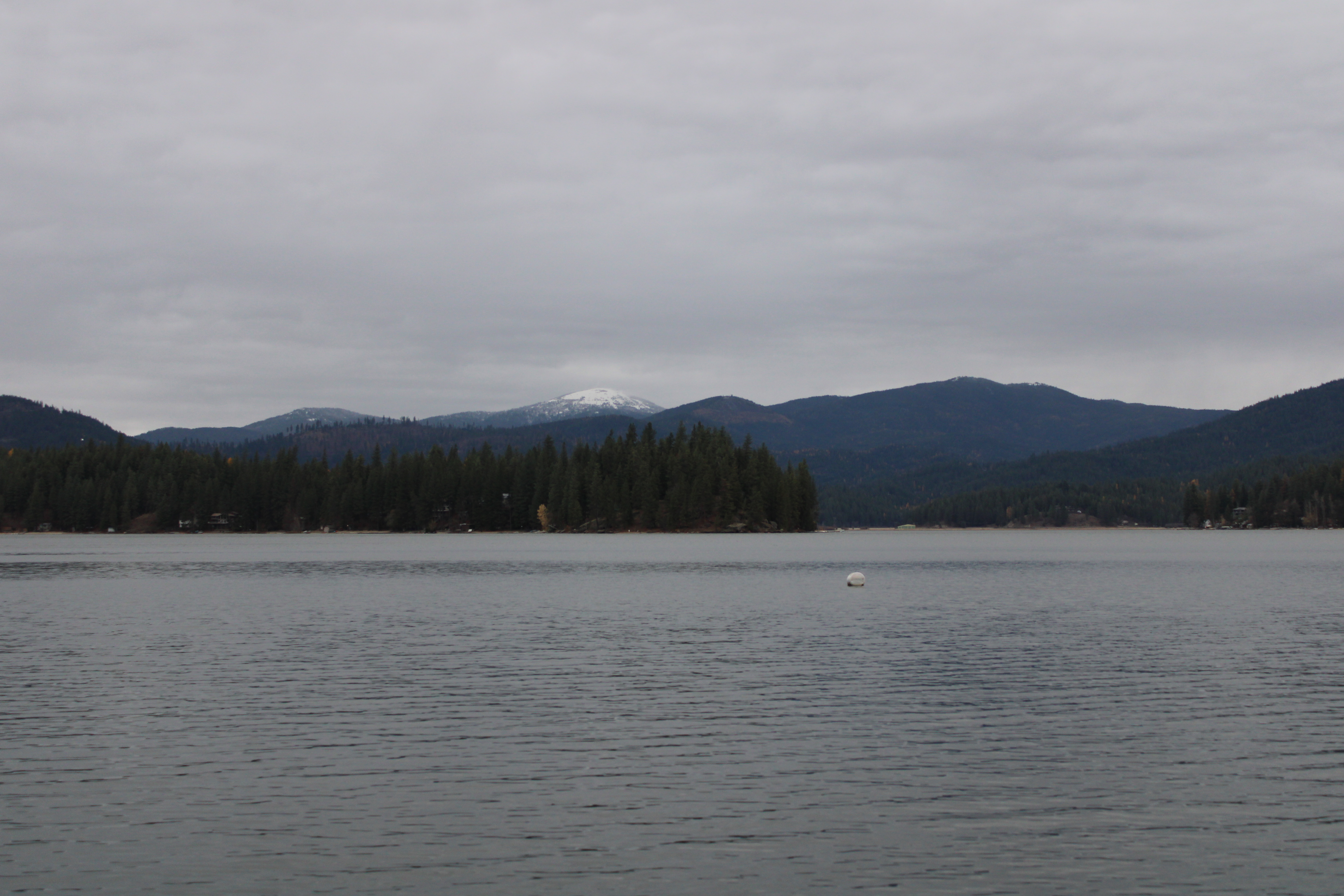
- View from Sutton Bay Resort
- Interactive map of Newman Lake
- Location: Spokane County
- Coordinates: 47.777189°N 117.100543°W
- Type: Mesotrophic
- Primary inflows: Thompson Creek
- Primary outflows: Newman Lake Peat Dike
- Catchment area: 7,511 hectares (29.00 sq mi)
- Basin countries: United States
- Surface area: 486 hectares (1,200 acres)
- Average depth: 5.8 metres (19 ft)
- Max. depth: 9.1 metres (30 ft)
- Water volume: 28,123,344 cubic metres (36,783,945 cu yd)
- Shore length^{1}: 16 kilometres (9.9 mi)
- Surface elevation: 649 metres (2,129 ft)
- ^{1} Shore length is not a well-defined measure.

Newman Lake is a lake in Spokane County, Washington, United States. It is a 1200 acre (486 ha) lake located 12 miles northeast of Spokane, Washington. The lake was named for William Newman, who settled there in 1865.

== History ==
Deposits of kame from the Cordilleran ice sheet blocked outflow from the Missoula floods, eventually forming Newman Lake as well as other nearby water bodies. It became a site of periodic habitation by native tribes; local legend describes native activity to include harvesting huckleberries for pemmican and collecting camas root to be dried and converted to flour, as well as hunting and fishing.

Newman Lake was originally settled by William Newman in the 1860s, and was serviced by the Northern Pacific Railway from the late 19th into the 20th centuries. The area has historically been a recreational destination, with record of at least four hotels conducting business on its shoreline. The nearby community had its name changed from Moab to Newman Lake in the 1930s.

Ellerport Airport, situated one mile south of the lake, became operational in August 1985.

== Details ==
=== Fish ===
Brook trout and carp were reported to have been introduced to the lake in the 1880s; the lake is also home to black crappie, bluegill, brown bullhead, largemouth bass, pumpkinseed sunfish, signal crayfish, tiger muskie, and yellow perch.

In 2012 it was reported that Newman Lake was home to freshwater jellyfish.

=== Water quality projects ===
Concerns voiced by locals in the 1970s and 1980s regarding increased algal blooms occurring in the lake prompted a Restoration Feasibility study in the mid-1980s, revealing a total annual gross phosphorus loading of at least 3000 kg per year within the lake. After receiving a grant from the Washington State Department of Ecology, a hypolimnetic aeration system was installed in 1992 to improve oxygen dissolution in the water; this was the first time a submerged pump had been implemented for this purpose on such a large scale.

In 1997, a microfloc alum injection system was installed in the lake, which disperses aluminum hydroxide for the purposes of binding to phosphorus particles in the water.

In 2009, a Total maximum daily load (TMDL) report by the Washington State Department of Ecology described the target total annual gross phosphorus loading as 903 kilograms (1,991 lb) per year, and proposed 11 strategies for reducing phosphorus entering the lake. These strategies primarily focus on updating the standards and practices of state and local government, as well as property owners and residents throughout the watershed, and emphasize measures to halt erosion, stem runoff from roads and prevent phosphorus leaching from sources along the shoreline.

In 2021, eighteen beaver dam analogs were constructed along the length of Thompson Creek by Gonzaga University students to slow the flow of the water, filter out nutrient-rich sediment that has been contributing excess phosphorus to Newman Lake, and to hopefully restore Thompson Creek's floodplains.

== See also ==
- List of lakes of Washington
