= Rodna, Washington =

Ghost town in Washington (state)

- Ghost town
- Location within Washington (state)
- Coordinates: 47°17′44″N 117°48′00″W
- Country: United States
- State: Washington
- County: Spokane
- Established: 1912
- Elevation: 2,100 ft (640 m)
- Time zone: UTC-8 (Pacific (PST))
  - Summer (DST): UTC-7 (PDT)
- ZIP codes: 99004
- GNIS feature ID: 1511267

Rodna is an extinct town in Spokane County, in the U.S. state of Washington. The GNIS classifies it as a populated place.

A post office called Rodna was established in 1912, and remained in operation until 1931. A variant name was Ray.

Rodna was located in the far southeastern corner of Spokane County in the Channeled Scablands. The defunct Spokane, Portland and Seattle Railway ran through the site of the town, which is now accessible via the Columbia Plateau Trail. Rodna's location is about two miles northeast of the Martin Road trailhead. The trail connects the site with the site of another ghost town, Mock, located 10 miles north along the trail. The unincorporated community of Amber and the small lake of the same name lie midway between the two ghost towns. There are restroom facilities at the Amber Lake trailhead but no other services in the small community.

There are numerous lakes and ponds, almost all of which are oriented in a southwest-to-northeast direction due to the scouring erosion of the Missoula floods, in the area surrounding Rodna.
