= Dartford (disambiguation) =

Dartford is a town in Kent, South East England.

Dartford may also refer to:

- Dartford (UK Parliament constituency)
- Dartford, Washington, an unincorporated community
- Dartford Borough Council, an administrative authority in North West Kent, England
- Borough of Dartford, a district of Kent, England
- A village in Green Lake, Wisconsin
- A community in Trent Hills, Ontario
