= Mock, Washington =

Ghost town in Washington (state)

- Ghost town
- Location within the state of Washington
- Coordinates: 47°23′50″N 117°39′01″W
- Country: United States
- State: Washington
- County: Spokane
- Elevation: 2,300 ft (700 m)
- Time zone: UTC-8 (Pacific (PST))
  - Summer (DST): UTC-7 (PDT)
- ZIP codes: 99004
- GNIS feature ID: 1511159

Mock is an extinct town in Spokane County, in the U.S. state of Washington. The GNIS classifies it as a populated place.

The community was named after W. C. Mock, a railroad official.

The town was located along the defunct Spokane, Portland and Seattle Railway, the right-of-way of which is now the publicly accessible Columbia Plateau Trail. The site is located in the Channeled Scablands about eight miles southwest of Cheney and just outside the eastern edge of Turnbull National Wildlife Refuge. The community of Amber, Washington is 4.8 miles southwest of Mock on the trail and another ghost town, Rodna lies six miles beyond that. There are numerous lakes and ponds, almost all of which are oriented in a southwest-to-northeast direction due to the scouring erosion of the Missoula floods, in the area surrounding Mock.

During the construction of the Spokane, Portland and Seattle Railway, Mock was home to a labor camp for Italian laborers, contracted by Gabriel Ballante, to blast through basalt and build the railway. In 1906, the Italian laborers built a pair of rock ovens along the railway line to bake bread for sustenance during their labor. The rock ovens were listed on the National Register of Historic Places in 1976.
