= Great Northern School District =

School district in Washington, United States

Address
- 3115 North Spotted Road Spokane County, Washington, U.S.
- Coordinates: 47°41′12″N 117°31′07″W

District information
- Type: Public
- Motto: A great place to learn!
- Grades: K–6
- Established: 1894
- Superintendent: Kelly Shea
- Schools: 1
- NCES District ID: 5303270

Students and staff
- Students: 41 (as of 2018–19)

Other information
- Website: gnsd.k12.wa.us

The Great Northern School District No. 312 is a school district in Spokane County, Washington, United States. It covers a rural unincorporated area between Airway Heights and Spokane and has a single school, named Great Northern Elementary, that serves grades kindergarten to six.

The district was named for the Great Northern Railway, which donated the land on which the district's single school sits. The first school at the site was built in 1894 and replaced by a larger three-room building, which opened in 1914.

== History ==
The first one-room schoolhouse in the Highland area was built in 1894 on land donated by the Great Northern Railway. The district was named for the railroad, the area's largest taxpayer. The Great Northern School District graduated its first high school class in 1913, shortly after other rural districts were consolidated into it. The original building was replaced by a new brick building with three classrooms to accommodate more students.

The Great Northern School District later dropped its high school classes in favor of sending students to larger facilities in other districts. It was ordered to contribute $31,818 towards the construction of a new building at North Central High School in Spokane in 1978, requiring a special vote on lifting levy limits. The levy measure was passed by 90 percent of voters, allowing for school operations to remain funded and contributing their expected share of construction costs. The district also survived several statewide attempts at consolidating rural school districts proposed by the Washington State Legislature in the 1990s.

== Governance ==
The district is governed by a five-member board of directors elected to four-year terms in staggered years. It has 14 employees overseen by part-time superintendent Glenn Frizzell, who was hired in 1994. Its budget in 2017–18 was $803,357. He has since retired.

== Demographics ==
The Great Northern School District covers an area of 18.1 square miles (47 km^{2}) around the unincorporated area of Highland, located northeast of Airway Heights and northwest of Spokane. The school district is bordered to the south by the Cheney School District and to the east by Spokane Public Schools, the second-largest school district in Washington. The district's lone school has three classrooms that serve grades kindergarten to six. Older students are typically sent to nearby middle schools in Airway Heights, Cheney, and Spokane.

As of the 2018–19 school year, the district has an enrollment of 41 students, including those from outside of the district boundaries. The 2010 United States census counted a population of 695 residents within the school district boundaries, of which 22.6 percent were under the age of 18. The racial makeup of residents in 2010 was 94% White, 0.1% Black, 0.9% American Indian/Alaska Native, 1.0% Asian, 0.0% Native Hawaiian/Pacific Islander, 0.4% other races, and 3.3% reporting two or more races. Hispanic or Latino people of any race were 3.3% of the reported population. Data from the American Community Survey estimates that 47.1% of parents in the school district boundaries had a bachelor's degree or higher, while 34.1% had some college or an associate's degree.
