= Saltese Flats =

Wetland in Spokane County, Washington, United States

Coordinates: 47.629°N 117.129°W

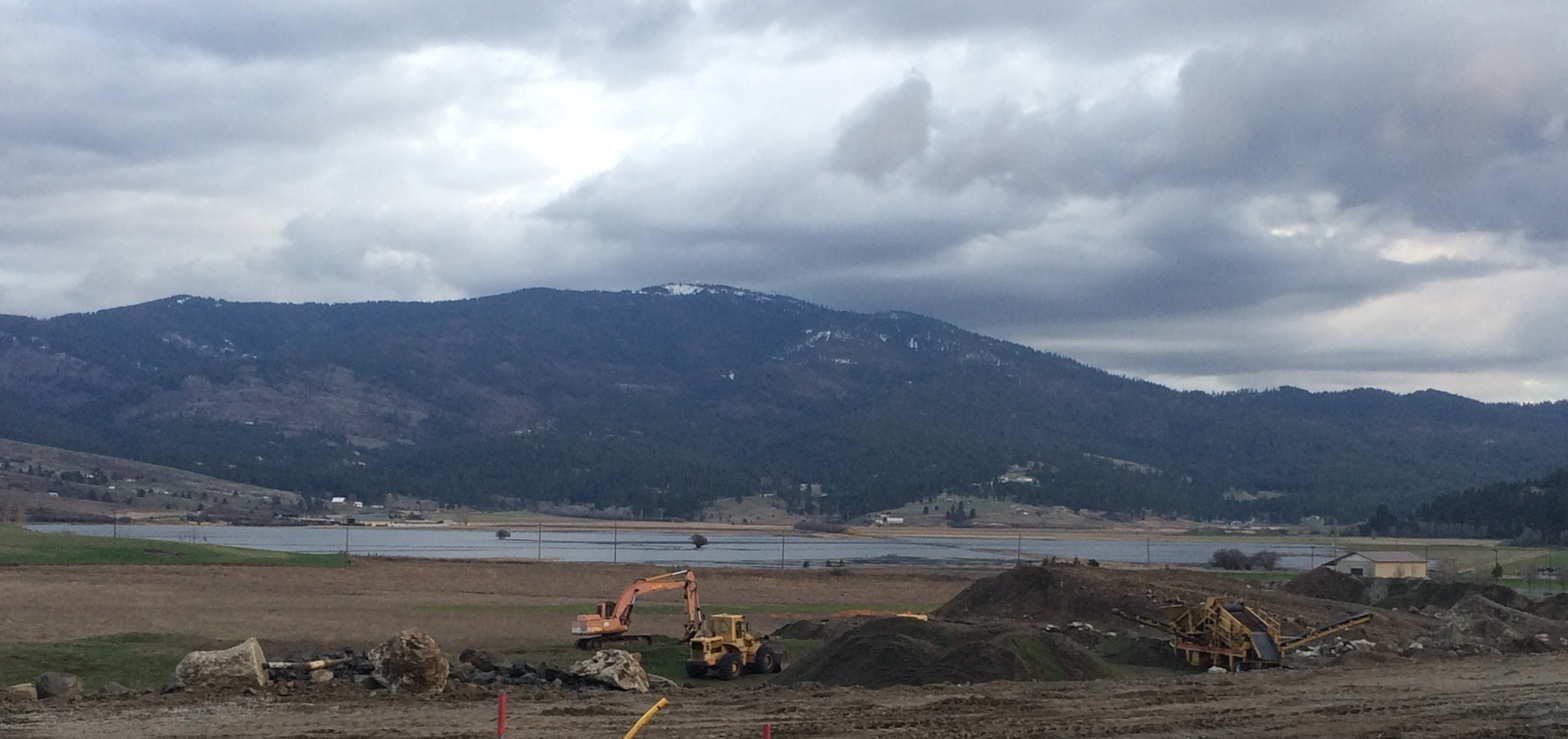
Saltese Lake was partially refilled in Spring 2017, after record-breaking winter precipitation.

Saltese Flats as seen in early 2023 from an aerial vantage point.

The Saltese Flats is a flat located in Spokane County, just outside Greenacres Washington, United States. The flats are occupied by the residual wetlands of the now-drained Saltese Lake. The term Saltese Flats is generally used to refer to both the flat and the occupying wetlands. The wetlands—which are overlooked by the Saltese Uplands—are primarily fed by Quinnamose and Saltese Creeks, and are also emptied by the latter.

The wetlands were originally drained for farming, but the Spokane County Environmental Services are actively trying to restore them. The primary goal is to restore the wetlands, and increase late summer water flow into the Spokane River (via the Spokane Valley–Rathdrum Prairie Aquifer). It serves as a contingency plan if the county is ordered to stop discharging wastewater directly into the Spokane River, whereby treated water could be released into the wetlands instead.

Since its rehabilitation, a trail system has been developed and the wetlands have become popular among nature enthusiasts, especially for birdwatching where over 194 species have been observed. The Doris Morrison Learning Center was opened on the premises in 2023 to teach the public about the history of the wetlands and about conservation.

== History ==
Saltese Lake as it appeared on a plat map dated May 1893.

The area known as the Saltese Flats, was once a Lake (even larger than the nearby Liberty Lake), but was drained by Peter Morrison in the 1890s so he could grow Timothy hay on the dry lakebed. Starting in 1894, Morrison used hired laborers and horses to dig 10 miles (16 km) of drainage canals diverting water into Saltese Creek. Within weeks of the canals being finished, the lake had completely drained. The creek, which originally ended at the lake, now carries water an additional 2.5 miles (4.0 km) before terminating at what is now known as Shelley Lake. The Lake—originally spelled "Seltice" Lake—was named after Chief Andrew Seltice of the Coeur d'Alene tribe, who lived in a home on the west side of the lake.
