= Spokane Valley–Rathdrum Prairie Aquifer =

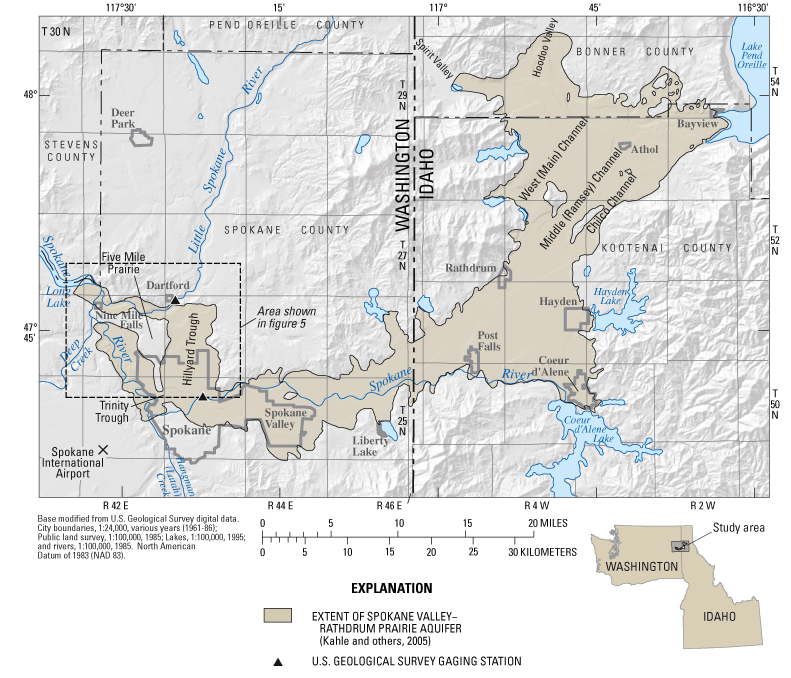
- Map of the Aquifer

- Location in the United States Location in Idaho
- Location: Inland Northwest, United States
- Coordinates: 47.7°N 117°W
- Primary inflows: Lake Pend Oreille; Lake Coeur d'Alene; Hayden Lake; Liberty Lake; Shelley Lake; Hauser Lake; Newman Lake; Spirit Lake; Twin Lakes; Blanchard Lake
- Primary outflows: Spokane River
- Basin countries: United States
- Surface area: 370 square miles (960 km^{2})
- Water volume: 10 trillion gallons (12,000 km^{3})

The Spokane Valley–Rathdrum Prairie (SVRP) Aquifer is an aquifer in the northwest United States, underlying 370 square miles in eastern Washington and northern Idaho.

The aquifer is centralized under Spokane Valley and the Rathdrum Prairie, hence the name, and is part of the Columbia River drainage basin. It is composed of unconsolidated gravels, cobbles, and boulders deposited during the glacial flooding of Lake Missoula. The aquifer is highly permeable and in direct contact with the surface, so there is a high interchange rate between surface water and the aquifer. The Spokane River and Little Spokane River lie directly above the aquifer and receive aquifer outflow. The area surrounding it receives an average of 15–30 inches (38–76 cm) of rain annually. The aquifer is the primary water source for the greater Spokane area.

== Productivity ==
The Spokane Valley–Rathdrum Prairie Aquifer is one of the fastest and most productive aquifers in the country. The volume of the aquifer is about ten trillion gallons (38 trillion liters) of water. It supplies water to over 500,000 people in the Spokane region, producing an average of 146 million gallons of water each day. The coarse-grained materials that make up the aquifer contribute, in part, to the aquifer's high productivity and velocities of up to 60 feet per day. The high interexchange rate between the SVRP Aquifer and groundwater flow also contributes to its high recharge and flow rates.

== Contamination ==
The Spokane Valley-Rathdrum Prairie (SVRP) Aquifer is unconfined and has no protective layer, which makes it vulnerable to contamination from a variety of pollutants. As a result, many local organizations monitor water quality in the aquifer and investigate potentially dangerous contaminants. A 1988 technical report of the aquifer from the Idaho Department of Health and Welfare investigated and ranked 14 potential contaminants. In order from greatest to least potential for contamination, these contaminants included: agriculture, petroleum, landfills, hazardous materials, subsurface sewage disposal systems, surface runoff/dry wells, industrial wastewater, land application of septage and sludges, pits, ponds and lagoons, dairies and feedlots, radioactivity, silvicultural activities, well drillings, and mining. Aboveground fuel tank farms are also a concern. Within the aquifer's watershed, several fuel tank farms house thousands of gallons of fuel for companies like Exxon-Mobil. If not properly constructed, monitored, and used, these tanks could burst, contaminating the nearby communities’ source of drinking water as fuel seeps through the ground and into the aquifer. In 1978, the SVRP Aquifer became the second aquifer designated as a "sole source aquifer" by the EPA. Protecting and maintaining the aquifer's quality is considered critical by the community. Several programs have been recommended to preserve the aquifer, including education, monitoring, management, and regulation.

== Aquifer-Spokane River Interaction ==
One unique aspect of the SVRP Aquifer is its interaction with the Spokane River. The two water bodies share a cycle of gaining and losing water to each other, and this function is important to both the river and the aquifer. The Spokane River receives about 59% of the water that exits the aquifer. At the same time, it is also the greatest source of inflow to the aquifer. This water interchange occurs in a series of gaining reaches and losing reaches of the Spokane River. In the gaining reaches of the river, the surface level of groundwater in the aquifer is above the bottom of the river. This causes water to flow from the aquifer into the river. On the other hand, losing reaches occur when the river bottom is above the aquifer's water level, resulting in a transfer of water from the river to the aquifer.
