= Airway Heights, Washington =

- City
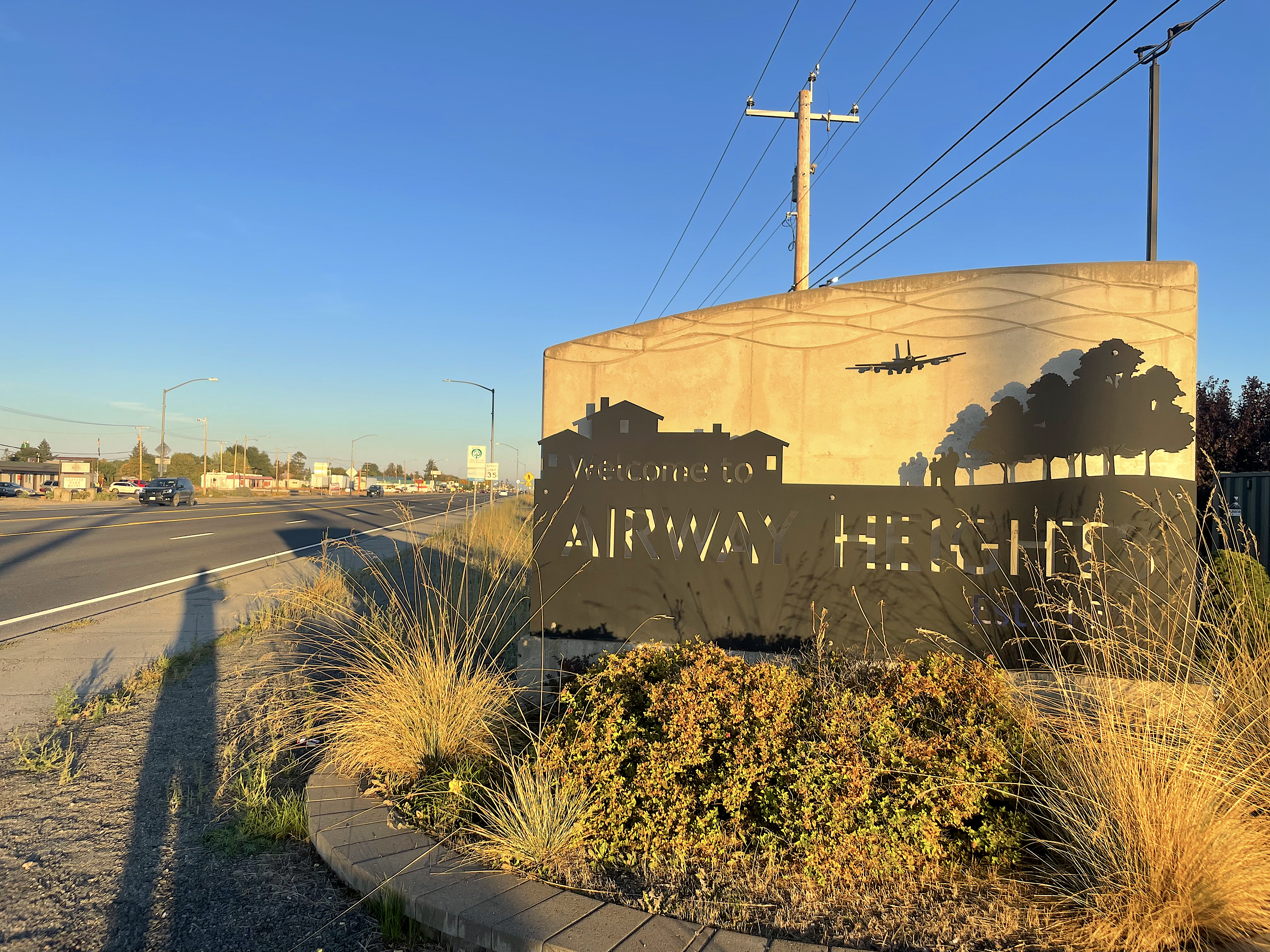
- Welcome to Airway Heights sign on U.S. Route 2

- Flag
- Interactive map of Airway Heights, Washington
- Coordinates: 47.645943°N 117.579197°W
- Country: United States
- State: Washington
- County: Spokane
- Founded: 1942
- Incorporated: June 28, 1955

Government
  - Type: Mayor–council
  - Mayor: Larry Bowman

Area
  - Total: 6.010 sq mi (15.567 km^{2})
  - Land: 6.010 sq mi (15.567 km^{2})
  - Water: 0 sq mi (0.000 km^{2}) 0.0%
- Elevation: 2,379 ft (725 m)

Population (2020)
  - Total: 10,757
  - Estimate (2024): 11,950
  - Density: 1,789.7/sq mi (691.01/km^{2})
- Time zone: UTC−8 (Pacific (PST))
  - Summer (DST): UTC−7 (PDT)
- ZIP Code: 99001
- Area code: 509
- FIPS code: 53-00905
- GNIS feature ID: 2409668
- Website: cawh.org

Airway Heights is a city in Spokane County, Washington, United States, just west of Spokane. It is part of the Spokane metropolitan area and had a population of 10,757 at the 2020 census, and was estimated at 11,950 in 2024. The city's name was taken from its close proximity to the runways at Fairchild Air Force Base and Spokane International Airport.

== History ==
Airway Heights was founded in 1942 by Carl M. and Flora K. Lundstrom under the Rocket Development Company. Plots sold by the company included racial covenants, restricting homeownership to only those of the "white race". Airway Heights was officially incorporated as a city on June 28, 1955, and Carl Lundstrom was elected its first mayor.

Growth in the city was spurred by the opening of the Airway Heights Corrections Center by the Washington State Department of Corrections in 1992 and the opening of the Northern Quest Resort & Casino by the Kalispel Indian Tribe in 2000. In the decades since, Airway Heights has seen the addition of new retailers, several new apartment buildings and housing developments, the expansion of the Northern Quest Casino, and the opening of the Spokane Tribe Casino.

== Geography ==
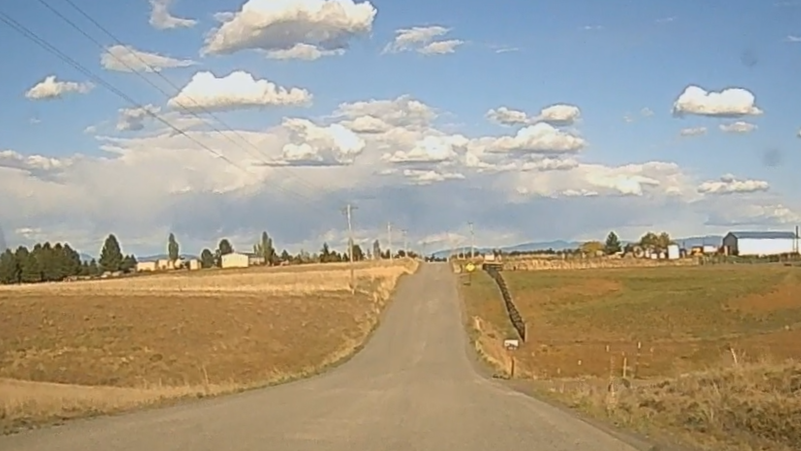
A rural scene north of Airway Heights looking east

Downtown Spokane is located eight miles by road east of Airway Heights. In 2012, the City of Spokane incorporated the Spokane International Airport and surrounding area, since which the city Spokane has bordered the city of Airway Heights to the east and south.

According to the United States Census Bureau, the city has a total area of 6.010 square miles (15.57 km^{2}), all land.

The community lies in the northeastern corner of the flat Columbia Plateau. While the plateau tends to be flat, the terrain locally is quite rugged as it is part of the Channeled Scablands. The "heights" in the city's name references its location at a higher elevation than the city center of Spokane. Traveling into Airway Heights along U.S. Route 2, the main road into the city, from Downtown Spokane, one will climb over 500 feet.

== Climate ==
Climate data for Airway Heights, Washington (Spokane Int'l), 1981–2010 normals
Month	Jan	Feb	Mar	Apr	May	Jun	Jul	Aug	Sep	Oct	Nov	Dec	Year
Record high °F (°C)	62 (17)	63 (17)	74 (23)	90 (32)	97 (36)	105 (41)	108 (42)	108 (42)	98 (37)	87 (31)	70 (21)	60 (16)	108 (42)
Mean daily maximum °F (°C)	34.4 (1.3)	39.6 (4.2)	48.9 (9.4)	57.2 (14.0)	66.4 (19.1)	73.8 (23.2)	83 (28.3)	83 (28.3)	72.9 (22.7)	58.0 (14.4)	41.6 (5.3)	32.2 (0.1)	57.6 (14.2)
Daily mean °F (°C)	29.55 (−1.36)	33 (1)	40.25 (4.58)	47 (8)	55.1 (12.8)	62.1 (16.7)	69.65 (20.92)	69.4 (20.8)	60.3 (15.7)	47.6 (8.7)	35.7 (2.1)	27.35 (−2.58)	48.08 (8.95)
Mean daily minimum °F (°C)	24.7 (−4.1)	26.4 (−3.1)	31.6 (−0.2)	36.8 (2.7)	43.8 (6.6)	50.4 (10.2)	56.3 (13.5)	55.8 (13.2)	47.4 (8.6)	37.2 (2.9)	29.8 (−1.2)	22.5 (−5.3)	38.6 (3.7)
Record low °F (°C)	−30 (−34)	−24 (−31)	−10 (−23)	14 (−10)	24 (−4)	33 (1)	37 (3)	35 (2)	22 (−6)	7 (−14)	−21 (−29)	−25 (−32)	−30 (−34)
Average precipitation inches (mm)	1.79 (45)	1.33 (34)	1.61 (41)	1.28 (33)	1.62 (41)	1.25 (32)	0.64 (16)	0.59 (15)	0.67 (17)	1.18 (30)	2.30 (58)	2.29 (58)	16.55 (420)
Average snowfall inches (cm)	12.0 (30)	7.2 (18)	3.7 (9.4)	1.0 (2.5)	0.1 (0.25)	0 (0)	0 (0)	0 (0)	0 (0)	0.1 (0.25)	7.2 (18)	14.9 (38)	46.2 (117)
Average precipitation days (≥ 0.01 in)	13.4	10.4	11.6	10.1	10.2	7.9	5.0	3.8	5.1	7.8	13.7	13.2	112.2
Average snowy days (≥ 0.1 in)	8.9	5.1	4.1	1.1	0.3	0	0	0	0	0.2	4.7	9.8	34.2
Average relative humidity (%)	62.0	81.5	75.0	66.5	60.5	58.0	50.5	45.5	49.0	57.0	68.0	81.5	80.5
Percentage possible sunshine	28	41	55	61	65	67	80	78	72	55	29	23	55
Source: NOAA (extremes 1881–present, percent sunshine through 2009)

== Demographics ==
Historical population
Census	Pop.	Note	%±
1960	708		—
1970	744		5.1%
1980	1,730		132.5%
1990	1,971		13.9%
2000	4,500		128.3%
2010	6,114		35.9%
2020	10,757		75.9%
2024 (est.)	11,950		11.1%
U.S. Decennial Census; 2020 Census

=== 2020 census ===
As of the 2020 census, Airway Heights had a population of 10,757 and 3,478 households, with a population density of 1,789.85 inhabitants per square mile (691.1/km^{2}).

The median age was 32.8 years; 20.5% of residents were under the age of 18 and 8.7% of residents were 65 years of age or older. For every 100 females there were 150.8 males, and for every 100 females age 18 and over there were 168.0 males age 18 and over.

100.0% of residents lived in urban areas, while 0.0% lived in rural areas.

There were 3,478 households in Airway Heights, of which 33.3% had children under the age of 18 living in them. Of all households, 34.8% were married-couple households, 25.7% were households with a male householder and no spouse or partner present, and 29.2% were households with a female householder and no spouse or partner present. About 29.8% of all households were made up of individuals and 7.2% had someone living alone who was 65 years of age or older.

There were 3,626 housing units at an average density of 603.33 per square mile (232.9/km^{2}), of which 4.1% were vacant. The homeowner vacancy rate was 1.9% and the rental vacancy rate was 3.2%.

Racial composition as of the 2020 census
Race	Number	Percent
White	7,295	67.8%
Black or African American	549	5.1%
American Indian and Alaska Native	472	4.4%
Asian	513	4.8%
Native Hawaiian and Other Pacific Islander	250	2.3%
Some other race	358	3.3%
Two or more races	1,320	12.3%
Hispanic or Latino (of any race)	1,270	11.8%

=== 2010 census ===
As of the 2010 census, there were 6,114 people, 1,547 households, 1,035 families residing in the city. The population density was 1,086.0 inhabitants per square mile (419.3/km^{2}). There were 1,727 housing units at an average density of 306.7 per square mile (118.4/km^{2}). The racial makeup of the city was 78.51% White, 7.16% African American, 3.75% Native American, 3.45% Asian, 0.92% Pacific Islander, 1.78% from some other races and 4.43% from two or more races. Hispanic or Latino people of any race were 8.29% of the population.

There were 1,547 households, 37.4% had children under the age of 18 living with them, 43.6% were married couples living together, 16.6% had a female householder with no husband present, 6.7% had a male householder with no wife present, and 33.1% were non-families. 25.1% of households were one person and 5.4% were one person aged 65 or older. The average household size was 2.54 and the average family size was 3.01.

The median age was 34.6 years. 17.3% of residents were under the age of 18; 11.1% were between the ages of 18 and 24; 40.9% were from 25 to 44; 25.2% were from 45 to 64; and 5.6% were 65 or older. The gender makeup of the city was 67.7% male and 32.3% female.

=== 2000 census ===
As of the 2000 census, there were 4,500 people, 958 households, 656 families residing in the city. The population density was 923.0 inhabitants per square mile (356.4/km^{2}). There were 1,095 housing units at an average density of 224.6 per square mile (86.7/km^{2}). The racial makeup of the city was 69.51% White, 10.47% African American, 3.20% Native American, 1.84% Asian, 0.38% Pacific Islander, 1.56% from some other races and 3.11% from two or more races. Hispanic or Latino people of any race were 9.93% of the population.

There were 958 households, 40.7% had children under the age of 18 living with them, 45.7% were married couples living together, 18.9% had a female householder with no husband present, and 31.5% were non-families. 25.3% of households were one person and 6.2% were one person aged 65 or older. The average household size was 2.55 and the average family size was 3.02.

The age distribution was 16.9% under the age of 18, 11.6% from 18 to 24, 46.8% from 25 to 44, 20.3% from 45 to 64, and 4.5% 65 or older. The median age was 34 years. For every 100 females, there were 263.2 males. For every 100 females age 18 and over, there were 325.0 males.

The median household income was $29,829 and the median family income was $31,344. Males had a median income of $26,117 versus $22,031 for females. The per capita income for the city was $11,069. About 14.8% of families and 22.0% of the population were below the poverty line, including 21.0% of those under age 18 and 3.0% of those age 65 or over.

== Education ==
The majority of the city is within the Cheney School District (No. 360). The northeastern portion is in the Great Northern School District (No. 312), grades K–6.

Airway Heights joined the Spokane County Library District in 2023 following a referendum of city residents. The city had already contracted with the library district to operate a branch in Airway Heights.

== Healthcare ==
The closest hospital to the city is Deaconess Medical Center, located in Downtown Spokane. Healthcare services located in the city itself include the Airway Heights Dental Center, West Plains Chiropractor, and APEX Physical Therapy.

== Transportation ==
U.S. Route 2 is the main east–west thoroughfare in the city, which lacks a traditional downtown area. A new street to serve as a local connector and alternative to the highway is planned for construction. U.S. Route 2 connects Airway Heights with Fairchild to the west and Spokane to the east. Interstate 90 runs just a few miles south of the city.

Public transportation is managed by the Spokane Transit Authority. Bus route 61, which serves Airway Heights, begins at the transit authority's main hub in Downtown Spokane, and extends to Fairchild Air Force Base.

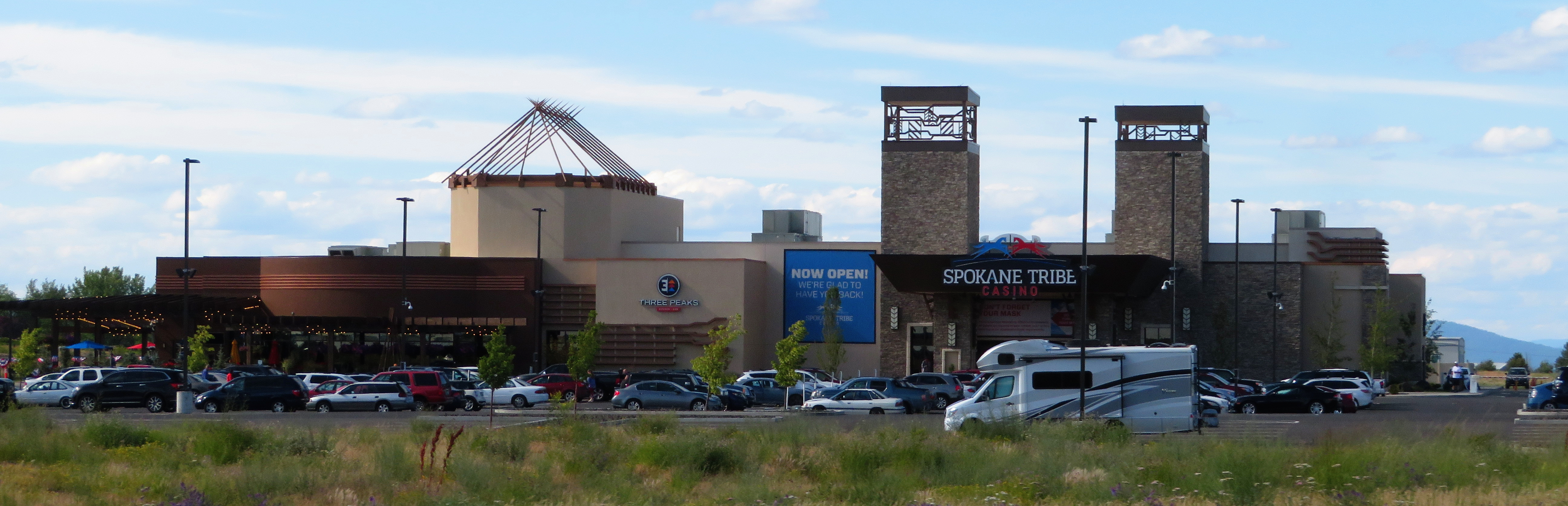
Spokane Tribe Casino is one of two casino hotels in the city

== Recreation ==
Spokane County Raceway is one of the largest racetracks in the Inland Northwest. It offers oval track racing, drag racing, and road course racing.

== Notable people ==
- Paul Freeman (1943–2003) cryptozoologist, died in his house in Airway Heights.

== Controversies ==
In July 2015 Mayor Patrick Rushing was asked to resign by the city council because he called President Barack Obama a "monkey man" and First Lady Michelle Obama a "gorilla" on his Facebook page. Rushing initially refused, stating he was not a racist. This follows an earlier incident in 2015 in which Rushing resigned his position as a school bus driver after he was charged with a misdemeanor for leaving the scene of an accident.

In August 2015 Rushing submitted his resignation. He stated, "I find it difficult to continue due to my declining health issues." He was succeeded by then-Deputy Mayor Kevin Richey.
