= Newman Lake, Washington =

Unincorporated community in Washington, United States

Newman Lake, Washington Moab
- Unincorporated community
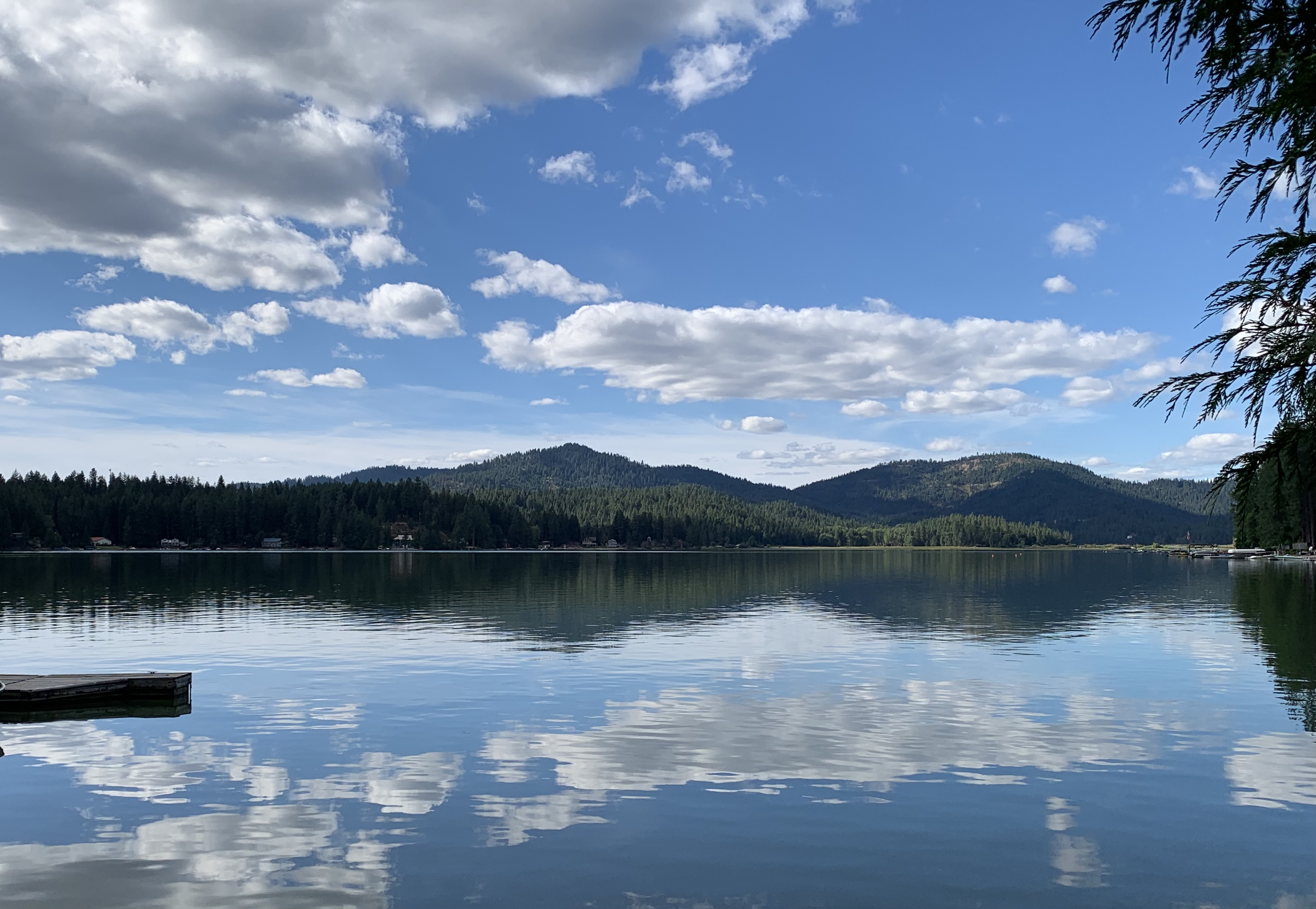

- Location within Washington (state)
- Coordinates: 47°46′37″N 117°05′42″W
- Country: United States
- State: Washington
- County: Spokane
- Elevation: 2,188 ft (667 m)
- Time zone: UTC-8 (Pacific (PST))
  - Summer (DST): UTC-7 (PDT)
- ZIP code: 99025
- Area code: 509
- GNIS feature ID: 1511452
- Website: http://newmanlake.com/ and http://newmanlakewa.com/

Newman Lake—historically and alternatively known as Moab—is an unincorporated community in Spokane County, Washington, United States. The eponymous lake, which took its name from early settler William Newman, is 17 miles (27 km) east-northeast of downtown Spokane. Newman Lake has a post office with ZIP code 99025. It is also home to Ellerport Airport, a private-use airport. As of the summer of 2014, freshwater jellyfish inhabited the lake.

The area was settled in the 1880s and served by the Northern Pacific Railway, which later ran excursion trains from Spokane. The local post office was renamed from Moab to Newman Lake in the 1930s.

== See also ==
- Newman Lake (Lake)
