= Denison, Washington =

Unincorporated community in Washington, United States

Denison
- Unincorporated community
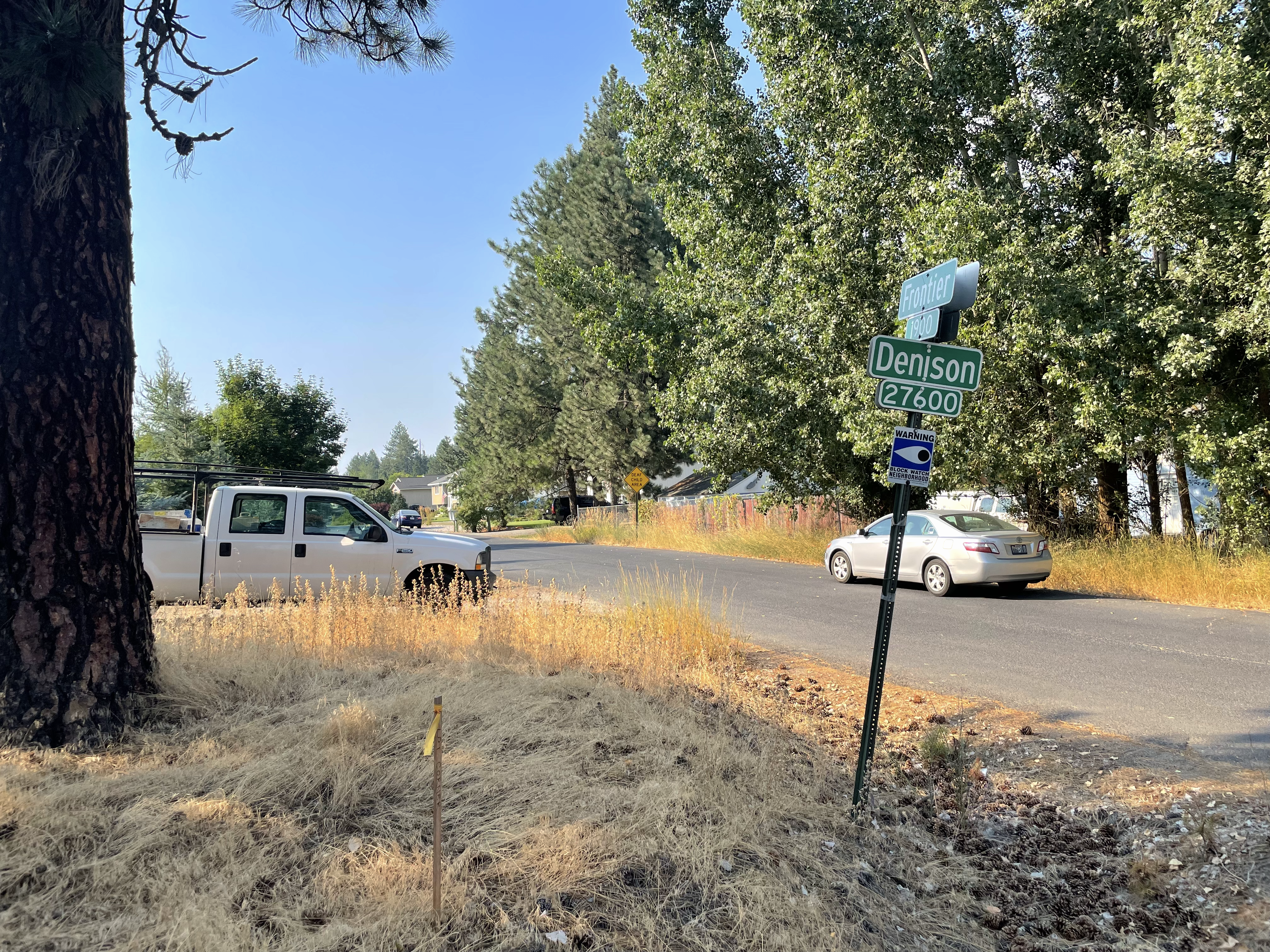
- Denison Road

- Location within the state of Washington
- Coordinates: 47°54′35″N 117°26′19″W
- Country: United States
- State: Washington
- County: Spokane
- Elevation: 1,962 ft (598 m)
- Time zone: UTC-8 (Pacific (PST))
  - Summer (DST): UTC-7 (PDT)
- ZIP Codes: 99006
- GNIS feature ID: 1510912

Denison is an unincorporated community in Spokane County, in the U.S. state of Washington. The community is located on U.S. Route 395 19 miles due north of Downtown Spokane and about seven miles beyond that city's northern suburban developments. Denison lends its name to two roads in the area, Denison Road and Denison-Chattaroy Road, both of which intersect with Route 395 in the immediate vicinity of Denison. The city of Deer Park is four miles to the north.

Denison is home to a 27-lot residential subdivision known as Denison Estates.

== History ==
This is the earlier location of Buckeye, Washington and a post office by that name operated from 1891-1892 until the Buckeye lumber company moved to area currently known by that name. Confusion emerged amongst workers seeking work at the lumber company, and this area was briefly renamed Pratt (1891–1892). Later, this same site was revived and named Denison with a post office that operated from 1908 to 1967. This name comes from the maiden name of an early settler's wife.

In the mid-to-late 1990s, Denison was developed into a residential community of single-family homes called Denison Estates. Water for the community was sourced not from Spokane County or nearby Deer Park, but rather the adjacent Stevens County Public Utility District, though that connection to Stevens County did not happen immediately. Instead, the original source of the water for the community was overly-acidic, which led to metal leaching from pipes and caused health problems for the new residents. In 2006, residents brought a lawsuit against the developer of Denison Estates and the construction company that built the homes claiming that they had been misled by the developers about the water source for the development. In March 2006, after a trial in Spokane County Superior Court, a jury ruled against the residents.
