= Buckeye, Washington =

Unincorporated community in Washington, United States

- Unincorporated community
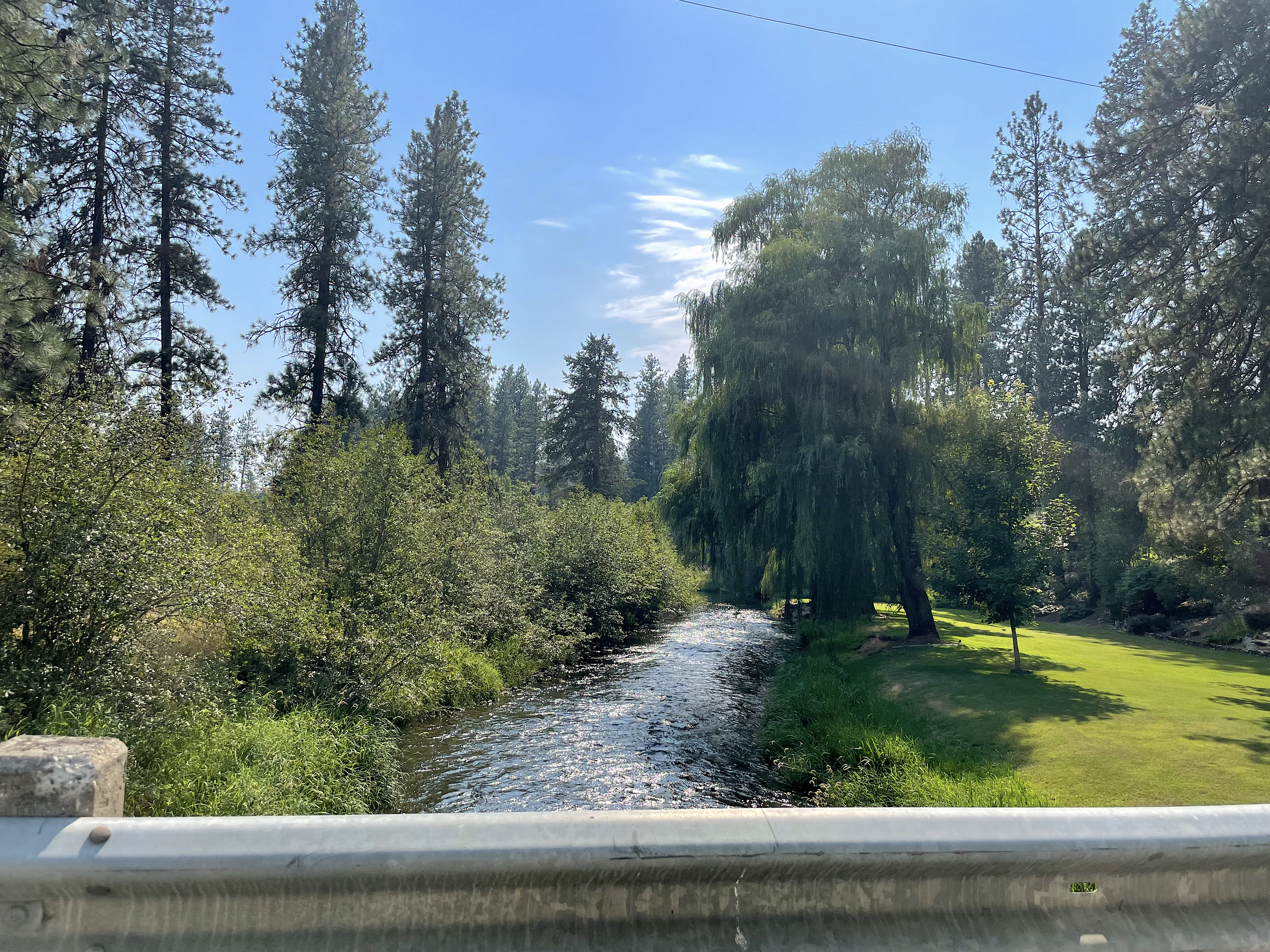
- Little Spokane River at Buckeye from Little Spokane Drive looking downstream

- Location within Washington (state)
- Coordinates: 47°50′33″N 117°22′28″W
- Country: United States
- State: Washington
- County: Spokane
- Elevation: 1,657 ft (505 m)
- Time zone: UTC-8 (Pacific (PST))
  - Summer (DST): UTC-7 (PDT)
- ZIP code: 99005
- Area code: 509
- GNIS feature ID: 1510844

Buckeye is an unincorporated community in Spokane County, in the U.S. state of Washington. It is located along the Little Spokane River in the northern portion of the county.

== History ==
A post office called Buckeye was in operation between 1903 and 1934. The community took its name from the Buckeye Lumber Company which relocated to area from the place now known as Denison. Prior to this the Hockspur post office operated here from 1901 to 1903

Buckeye was once a small town site distinct from other communities in the area. It was the site of a mill, butcher shop, general store, schoolhouse and post office, as well as numerous homes for residents. By 1901, the Spokane Falls and Northern Railway passed through the community. There was a flag stop for the train at Buckeye.

The community declined as the 20th century wore on, and by the early 1960s Buckeye had been largely abandoned and forgotten, no longer resembling a true town-like community. Kay Ringo moved to Buckeye in 1961 and would encounter foundations of abandoned buildings in overgrown fields on morning walks around the area. She began to study the history of the community, and in 1977 published a book titled The Milltown Buckeye, Washington, and Surrounding Area, 1889 to 1912. Ringo died in 2013 at the age of 95.

While the original community no longer exists, with only a few original buildings remaining, the area is now the site of homes on large lots where the northern suburbs of Spokane give way to forests and farms. The Buckeye Valley Estates Homeowners Association was established in 1997. It represents a private development of single-family homes of an exurban character, located on the slopes above the Little Spokane River in the northwest of Buckeye.

== Geography ==
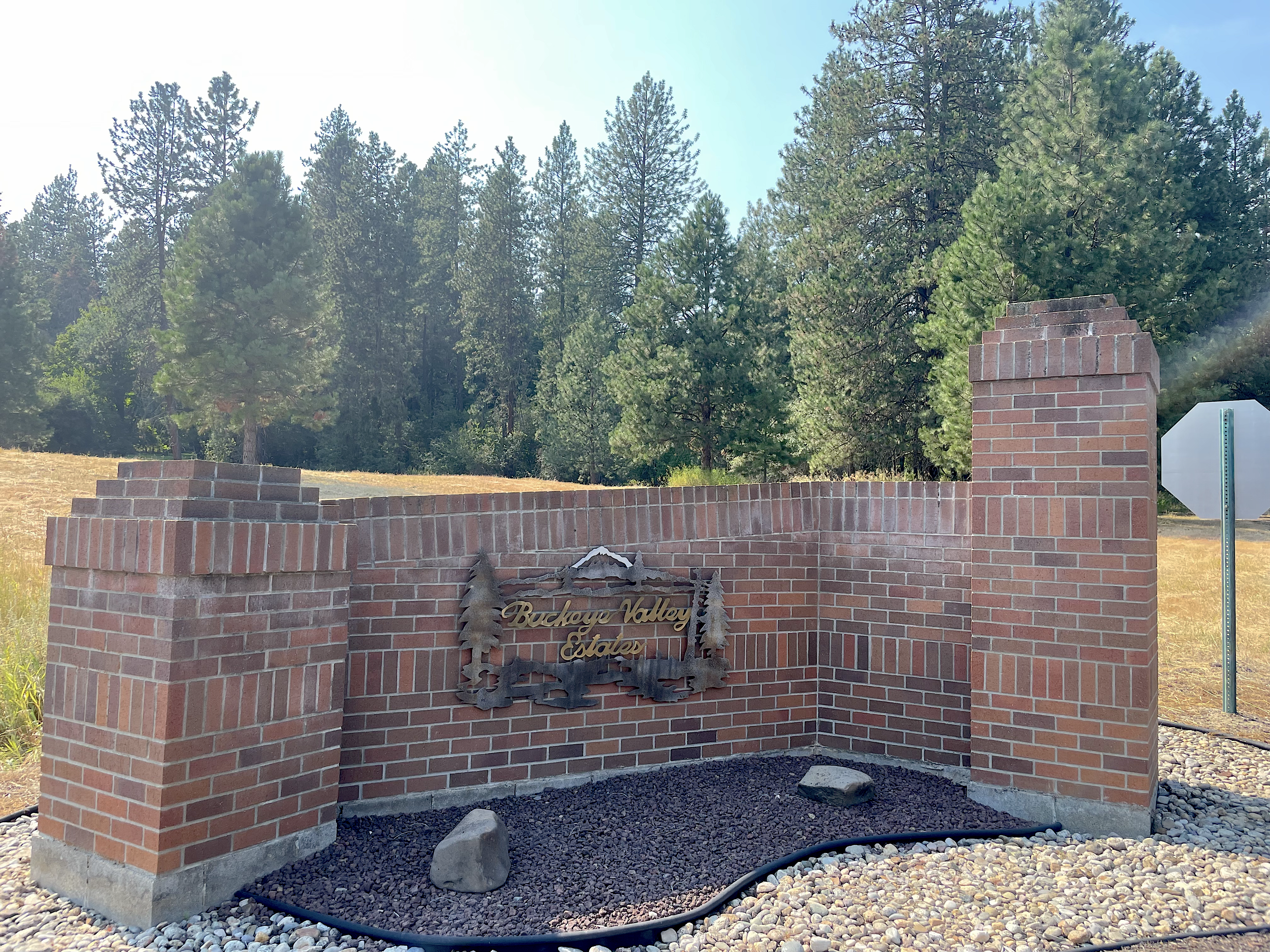
Residential development in Buckeye

Buckeye is located in northern Spokane County, approximately 15 miles by road north of Downtown Spokane in a valley cut by the Little Spokane River, which flows through the community in a roughly southward direction. The floor of the valley is at 1,657 feet above sea level, with the terrain rising to over 2,100 feet on the Half Moon Prairie approximately a mile to the west and northwest.

The community of Colbert is located two miles to the southeast, on the other side of U.S. Route 2. Buckeye is connected to U.S. 2 by Woolard Road.

Little Spokane Drive begins just north of Buckeye and passes through the community as it parallels the river from Buckeye south into the north Spokane suburbs and ultimately the community of Fairwood. Suburban levels of development reach within two miles of Buckeye to the south, while exurban level development exists in and around Buckeye itself.
