= Lake Hayden =

Lake in northern Idaho

- Hayden Lake
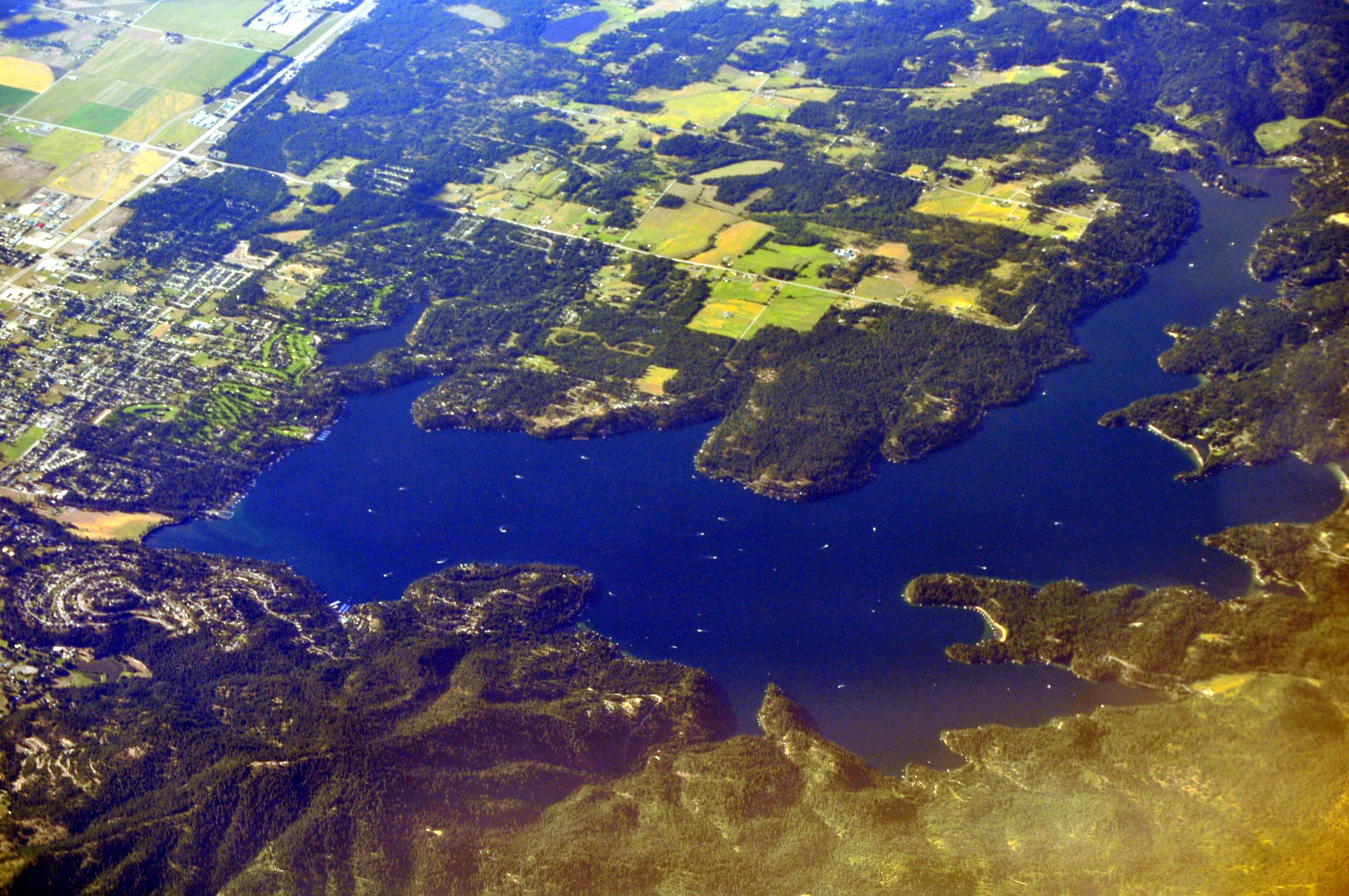

- Location within Idaho Location within the United States
- Location: Kootenai County, ID, United States
- Coordinates: 47°45′45″N 116°43′09″W
- Lake type: open lake
- Primary outflows: Spokane Valley–Rathdrum Prairie Aquifer
- Basin countries: United States
- Surface area: 3,800 acres (15.4 km^{2})
- Max. depth: 800 feet (244 m)
- Shore length^{1}: 40 miles (64 km)
- Surface elevation: 2,239 feet (682 m)
- Settlements: Hayden Lake; Hayden
- ^{1} Shore length is not a well-defined measure.

Lake Hayden, also known as Hayden Lake, is located Kootenai County, Idaho, United States. It is one of several natural lakes in the northern Idaho region. The lake is part of the Spokane Valley–Rathdrum Prairie Aquifer.

Its shoreline is heavily populated with homes and it has limited public access. There are four boat launches, three of them public. Originally known as Lake Hayden, it is now more commonly known as Hayden Lake, to match the eponymous city located on the lakes shores.

== See also ==
- Lake Coeur d'Alene
