= Dartford, Washington =

Unincorporated community in Washington, United States

Dartford
- Unincorporated community
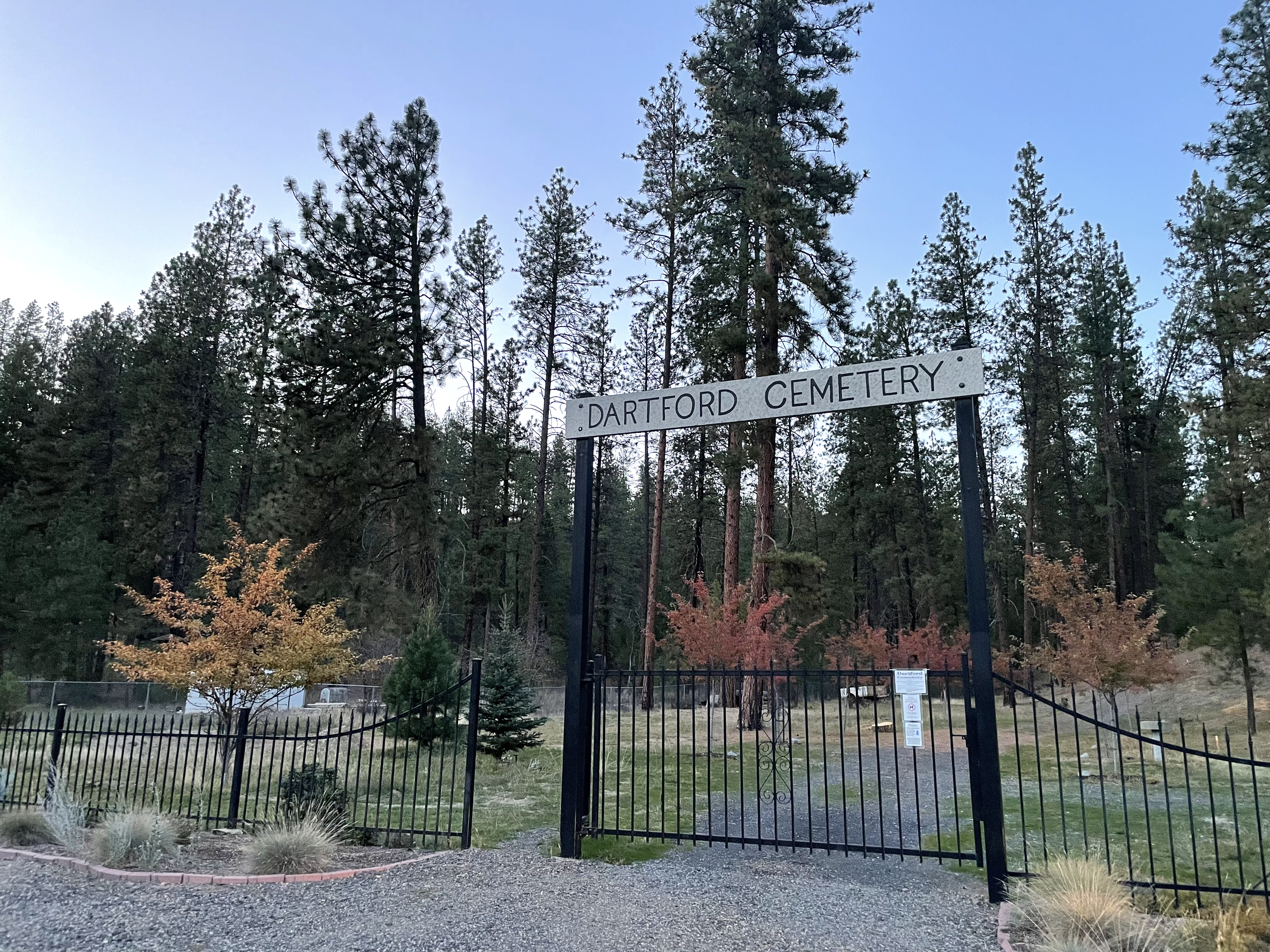

- Location within the state of Washington
- Coordinates: 47°47′05″N 117°25′01″W
- Country: United States
- State: Washington
- County: Spokane
- Elevation: 1,611 ft (491 m)
- Time zone: UTC-8 (Pacific (PST))
  - Summer (DST): UTC-7 (PDT)
- ZIP codes: 99208
- GNIS feature ID: 1512136

Dartford is an unincorporated community in Spokane County, in the U.S. state of Washington. It is a small community located along the shore of Dartford Creek and the Little Spokane River north of Spokane.

== History ==
A post office called Dartford was established in 1898, and remained in operation until 1906. Herbert Dart, the postmaster, gave the community its name.

Brothers Herb and Lafayette Dart came to Spokane from Walla Walla in 1879 and built a mill at the present site of Dartford in 1883. The mill was operational until 1922 and ultimately demolished in 1943. All that remains is a portion of the foundation and a wall. Youth organization Camp Fire operates the 51-acre Camp Dart-Lo in Dartford that includes the site of the former mill.

Dartford Cemetery on the western edge of the old town was established in 1896 after the death of a pioneer. As of 2015, 144 people have been buried in the cemetery.

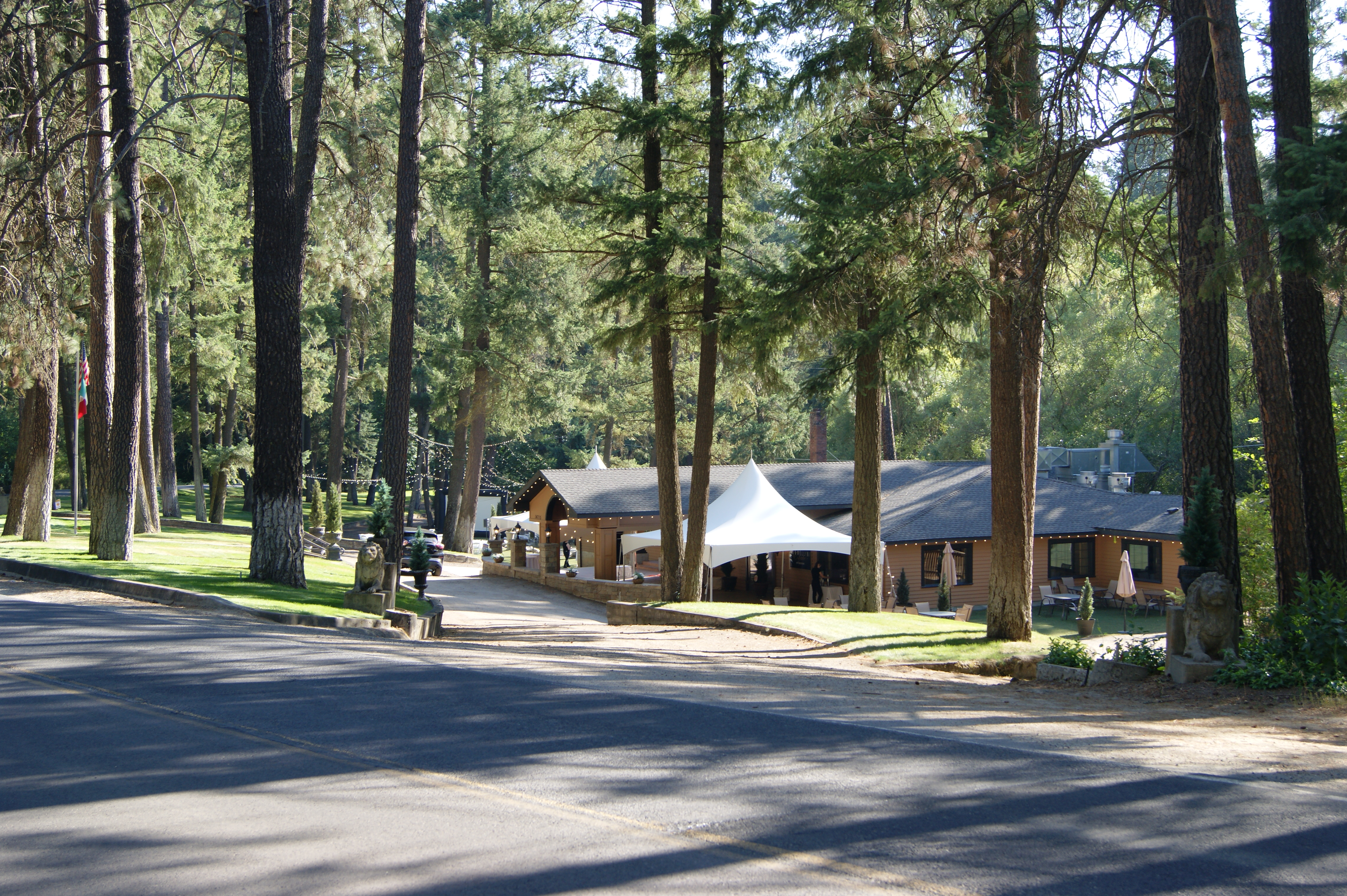
Commellini Estate

Along with the Dart brothers' mill, early Dartford was home to a general store, sawmill, post office, schoolhouse, livery stable, briquette factory and lumberyards. At present, however, the community of Dartford is almost exclusively made up of single-family homes. The most prominent operating business on Darftord Drive, just north of Camp Dart-Lo is the family-owned Commellini's Restaurant on the 100-acre (0.40 km^{2}) Commellini Estate. The estate, which had a pre-existing chicken ranch on it, was purchased by Albert Commellini in 1939 and named Commellini Junction. Albert and later his sister Leta, moved to the United States from Italy in 1907 and became prominent business and political figures in the Spokane area, owning an import business at Browne and Pacific and a luxurious dance and dining hall and movie theater, the Ambassador Club, on East Sprague (that Frank Capone was once reportedly interested in purchasing); Albert unsuccessfully ran for a Spokane County commissioner seat in 1933. After Albert converted a barn on the estate for use as a dance floor and used his influence to convinced the county put in a bus stop at Commellini Junction, the business became quite popular among the highly influential in the community. During the lead up to Expo '74, the restaurant once hosted a meeting between representatives of the United States and the Soviet Union and today is a popular venue for weddings.

== Geography ==
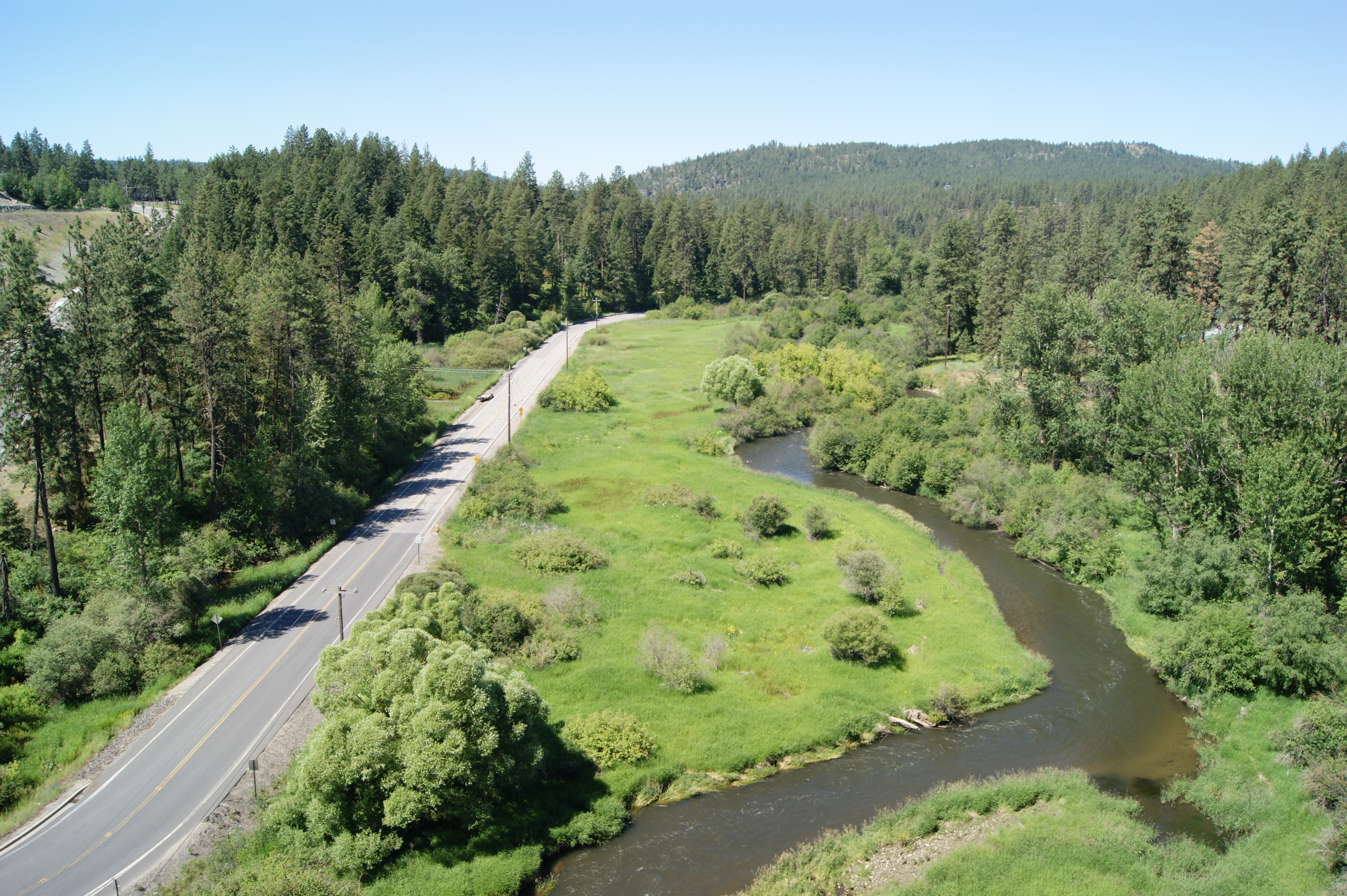
The Little Spokane River valley and Dartford Drive as seen from the U.S. Route 395 bridge.

Dartford is located just north of Fairwood, a suburban area immediately north of Spokane, in a valley at the confluence of Dartford Creek and the Little Spokane River. Its location alongside two bodies of water in a deep but small valley bottom makes it prone to occasional flooding, especially during springtime after a winter with heavy snow.

Dartford Drive and Hazard Road are the only surface streets leading into Dartford, but the community is nonetheless well connected to the rest of the Spokane area. U.S. Route 395, a major north-south thoroughfare in the Spokane area, passes a half-mile to the east of Dartford. The community located within a mile of Spokane's suburban sprawl, but its location surrounded by steep hills cut by Dartford Creek and the Little Spokane River give Dartford an isolated, natural character.

Dartford is served by the Mead School District.
