= Mount Hope, Washington =

Unincorporated community in Washington, United States

- Unincorporated community
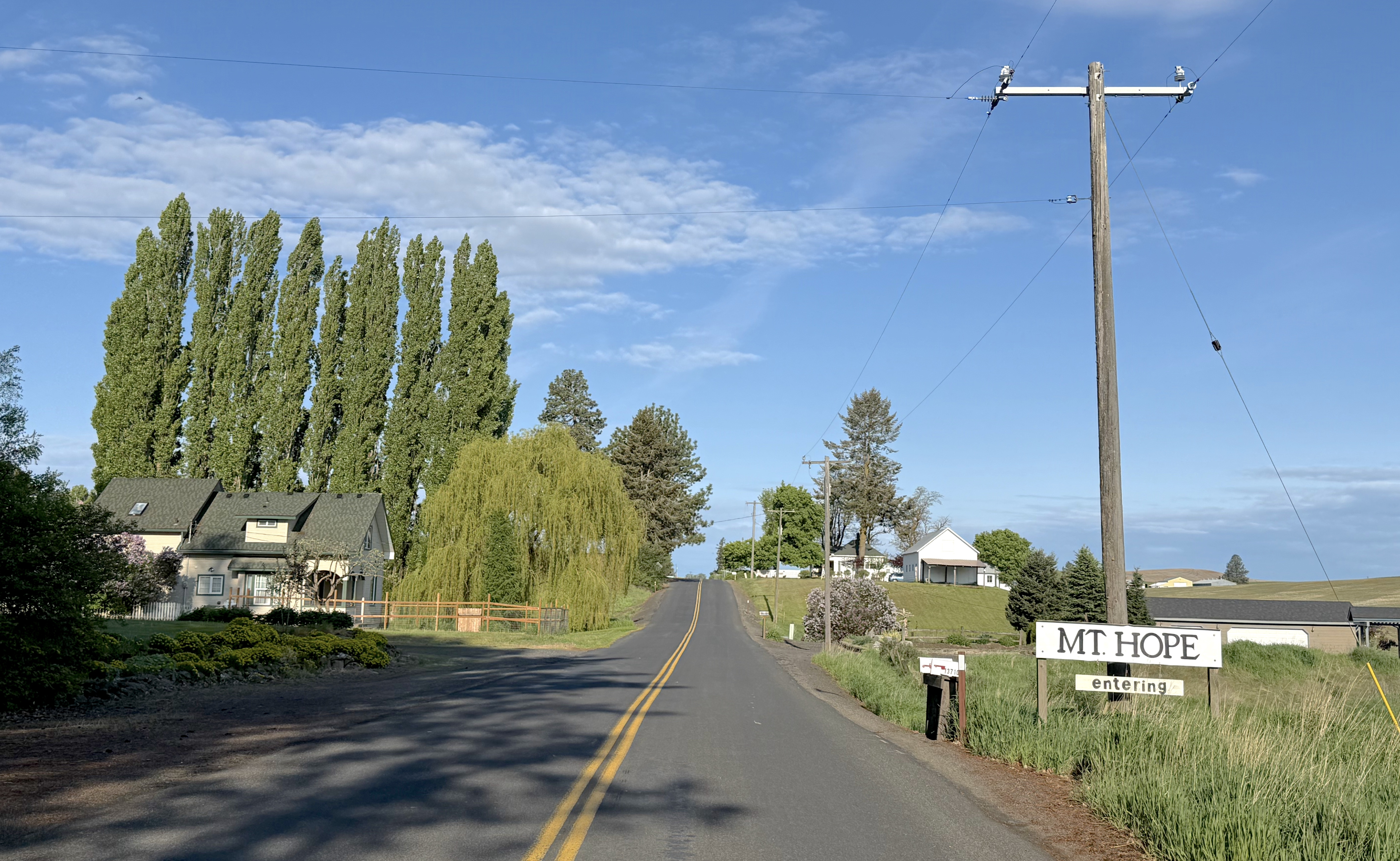

- Location within Washington (state)
- Coordinates: 47°26′57.6″N 117°13′0.7″W
- Country: United States
- State: Washington
- County: Spokane
- Elevation: 2,444 ft (745 m)
- Time zone: UTC-8 (Pacific (PST))
  - Summer (DST): UTC-7 (PDT)
- ZIP code: 99012
- Area code: 509
- GNIS feature ID: 1511168

Mount Hope is an unincorporated community in the Palouse region of southern Spokane County, Washington. The community is officially named "Mount Hope" but road signage in and leading to the community uses the abbreviated "Mt. Hope" spelling, as do the church and cemetery in the community.

== History ==
The community of Mount Hope dates to the 1877. The Mount Hope Cemetery is home to graves from as early as 1882 and the adjacent Mount Hope Community Church was established in 1887. In the early decades of the 20th century Mount Hope was a stop on the Spokane and Inland Empire Railroad. The railroad passed over a 1,360 foot long curved wooden trestle, the longest in the world at the time, as it crossed nearby Rock Creek north of Mount Hope. Passenger service on the railroad served Mount Hope until the late 1930s. The tracks were subsequently removed and the depot demolished, though as of 2006 the building housing transformers to power the railroad was still standing.

== Geography ==
Mount Hope is located in southeastern Spokane County in the rolling hills of the Palouse agricultural region. It sits on a relatively flat plateau between the valleys of Latah Creek to the west and Rock Creek to the north at an elevation of 2,444 above sea level. The ephemeral Fisher Creek drains the community into Rock Creek. Valley Chapel Road runs through the community connecting it with the Spokane Urban Area approximately 15 miles to the north and the town of Rockford five miles to the east. There is a fire station located in the community.

== Gallery ==
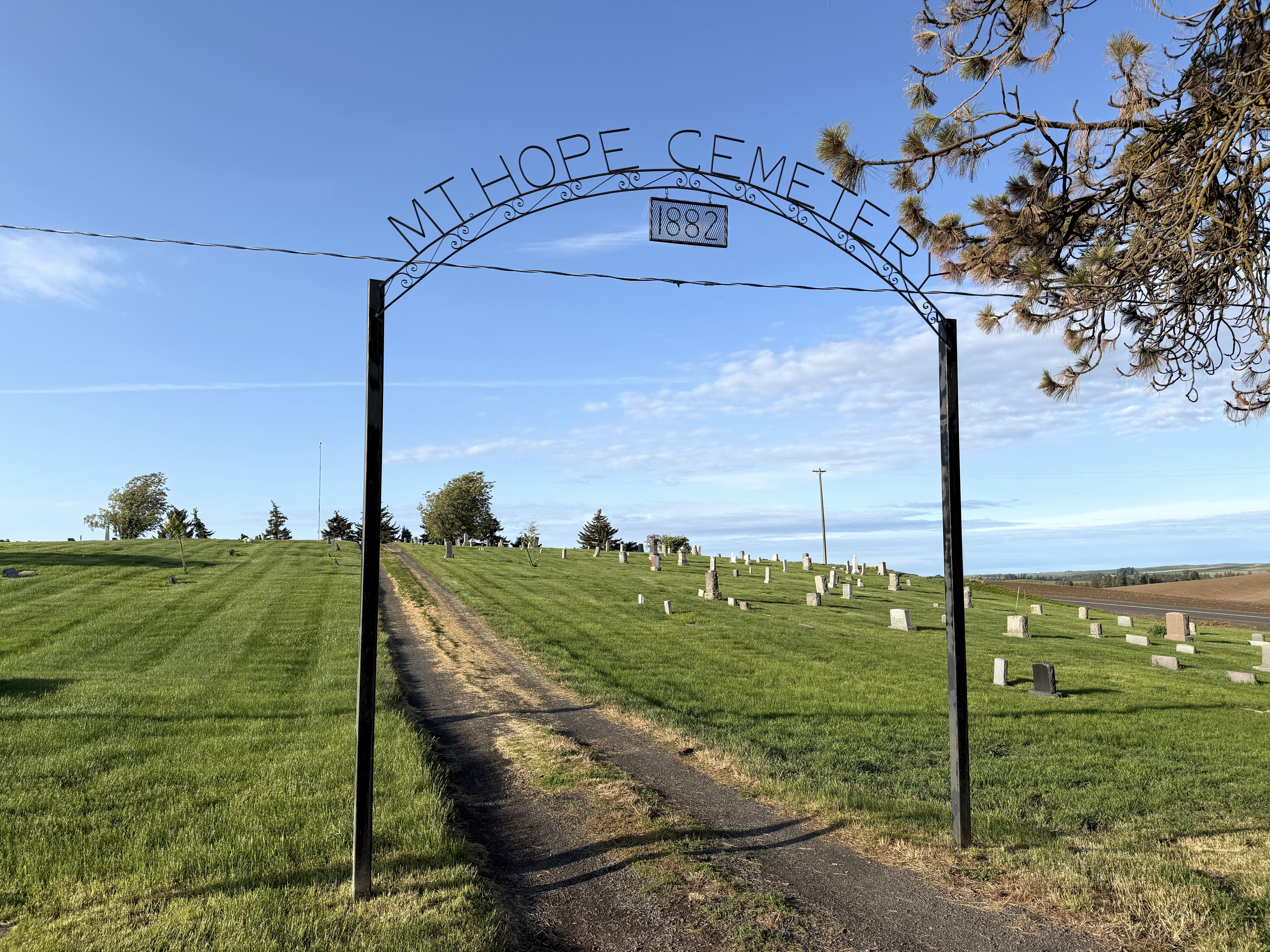
Mt. Hope Cemetery

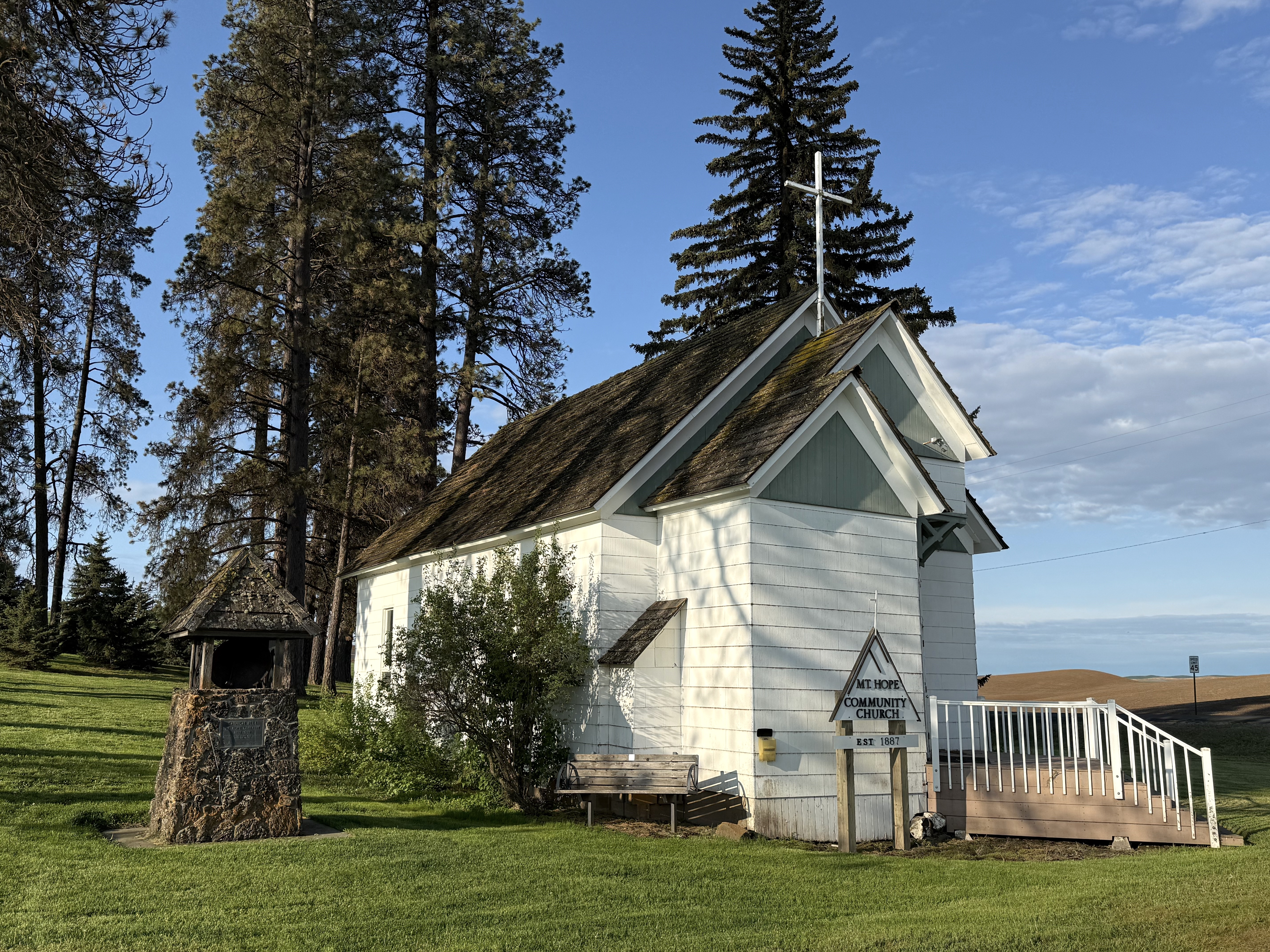
Mt. Hope Community Church
