= Eloika Lake =

- Location within Washington (state) Location within the United States
- Coordinates: 48°01′41″N 117°22′50″W
- Lake type: open lake
- Primary inflows: West Branch Little Spokane River
- Primary outflows: Little Spokane River
- Basin countries: United States
- Max. length: 2.9 mi (4.7 km)
- Max. width: 0.4 mi (0.64 km)
- Surface area: 629.3 acres (254.7 ha)
- Average depth: 7.4 ft (2.3 m)
- Max. depth: 15 ft (4.6 m)
- Surface elevation: 1,909 feet (582 m)

Eloika Lake is a lake in northern Spokane County in the U.S. state of Washington. The lake is located along the West Branch Little Spokane River as it flows south through the foothills of the Selkirk Mountains. The lake's proximity to the city of Spokane and its location just one mile from U.S. Route 2 make it a popular location for fishing.

== History ==
For centuries prior to the arrival of European settlers, Eloika Lake and the waterways which connect it to other bodies of water, had been traditional fishing grounds for indigenous populations like the Spokane people.

After the arrival of European settlers, the surrounding area saw the arrival of early homesteaders in the 1860s who came to the area for opportunities in the logging industry. Timber would be floated down the West Branch Little Spokane River to sawmills just downstream of the lake, south of present Eloika Lake Road. This activity continued until 1926. Lake levels would be raised and lowered during this period, which would later lead landowners to file suits with the state to establish a minimum depth for the lake. In 1960, the lake level was fixed at 1,908.28 feet above sea level. A county road constructed along the southern outlet of the lake in 1968 constrained the outflow of water to two culverts.

Conservation and restoration efforts began in the 1980s. 1986, the Eloika Lake Community Association pushed a coalition of the Spokane County Conservation District, Soil Conservation Service and the Idaho-Washington Resource Conservation and Development Council into action to craft a restoration plan for the lake. With state funding, studies looking into weed management were undertaken. Two years later, in 1988, Eastern Washington University conducted water quality studies on the lake. Those studies determined that the eutrophication in the lake was due in part to its shallow depth and exacerbated by decaying organic material from the historic logging activity. Studies have continued in the decades since looking into the previous issues as well as maintaining water flow rates downstream of the lake during all four seasons.

== Geography ==
Eloika Lake is approximately 3 miles long by one-half mile wide in far northern Spokane County. It is fed and drained by the West Branch Little Spokane River, which meets the main branch of the Little Spokane River approximately 2.5 miles as the crow flies downstream.

The Eloika Lake drainage basin, through the West Branch Spokane River upstream of the lake, constitutes the northernmost extent of the Little Spokane River drainage basin, extending into Pend Oreille and Stevens Counties to the north and northwest. It includes numerous other named lakes including Fan Lake, Ponderosa Lake, Horseshoe Lake, Blue Lake, Trout Lake, Sacheen Lake and Diamond Lake. The terrain upstream of the lake becomes more mountainous, with peaks rising to over 2,960 feet above sea level just beyond the Stevens County line. However, the area immediately surrounding Eloika Lake, with a surface elevation of 1,909 feet, is relatively flat, especially to the south and east.
