= Spokane County, Washington =

County in Washington, United States

- County
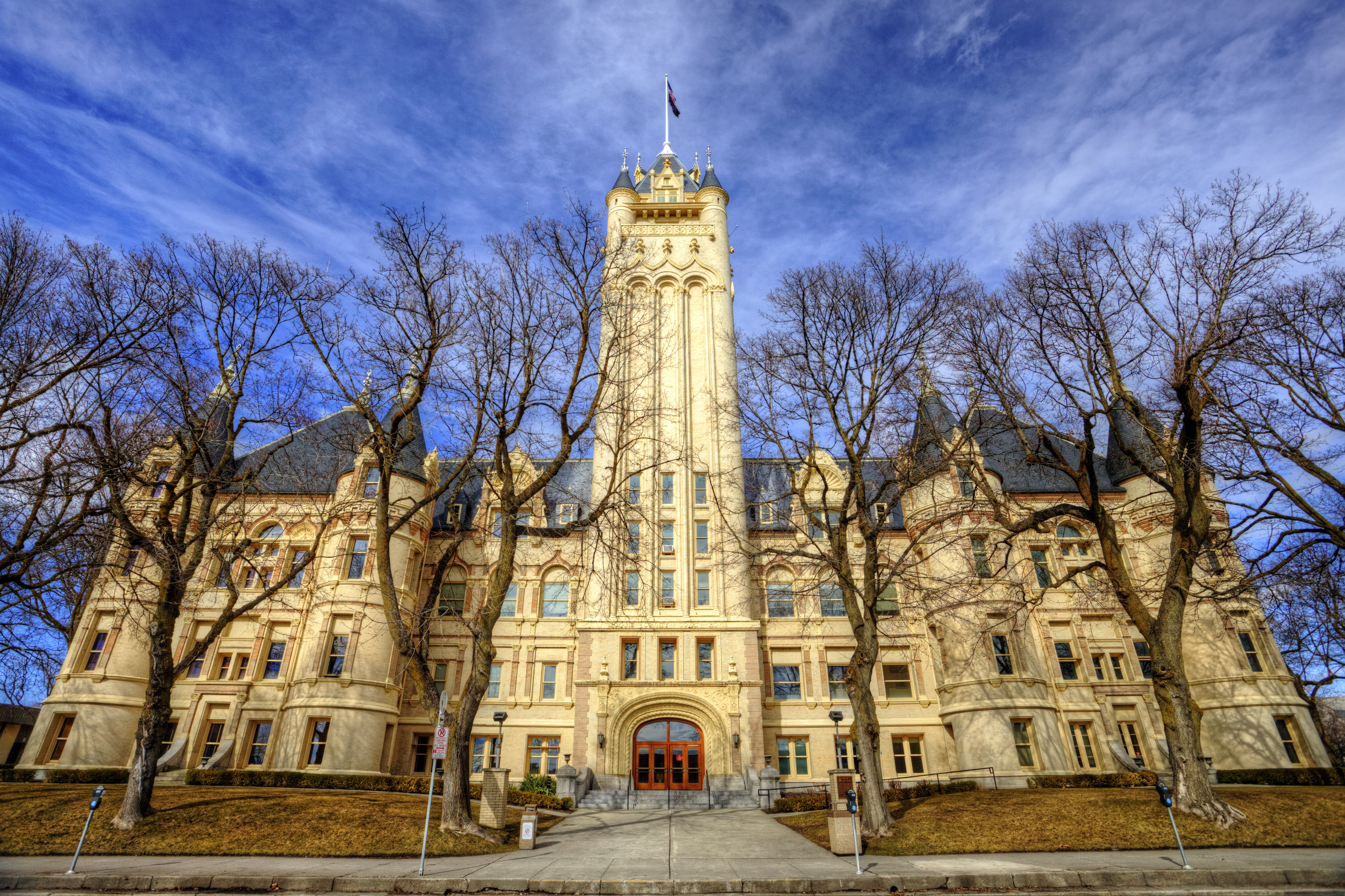
- The Spokane County Courthouse in Spokane

- Logo

- Location within the U.S. state of Washington
- Coordinates: 47.620375°N 117.403371°W
- Country: United States
- State: Washington
- Created: January 29, 1858
- Annexed to Stevens Co.: January 19, 1864
- Separated from Stevens Co.: October 30, 1879
- Named for: Spokane people
- Seat: Spokane
- Largest city: Spokane

Government
  - Sheriff: John Nowels

Area
  - Total: 1,780.984 sq mi (4,612.73 km^{2})
  - Land: 1,764.224 sq mi (4,569.32 km^{2})
  - Water: 16.760 sq mi (43.41 km^{2}) 0.94%

Population (2020)
  - Total: 539,339
  - Estimate (2025): 558,344 ▲
  - Density: 316/sq mi (122/km^{2})
- Demonym: Spokanite
- Time zone: UTC−8 (Pacific)
  - Summer (DST): UTC−7 (PDT)
- Area code: 509
- Congressional district: 5th
- Website: spokanecounty.gov

Spokane County is a county located in the U.S. state of Washington. As of the 2020 census, its population was 539,339, and was estimated to be 555,947 in 2024, making it the fourth-most populous county in Washington. The county seat and largest city is Spokane, the second largest city in the state after Seattle. The county is named after the Spokane people.

Spokane County is part of the Spokane metropolitan area, which is also part of the greater Spokane–Coeur d'Alene combined statistical area that includes nearby Kootenai County, Idaho.

== History ==
The first humans to arrive in what is now Spokane County arrived between 12,000 and 8,000 years ago and were hunter-gatherer societies who lived off the plentiful game in the area. Initially, the settlers hunted predominantly bison and antelope, but after the game migrated out of the region, the native people became dependent on gathering various roots, berries, and nuts, and harvesting fish. The Spokane tribe, after which the county is named, means "Children of the Sun" or "sun people" in Salishan Explorer-geographer David Thompson, working as head of the North West Company's Columbia Department, became the first European to explore what is now the Inland Northwest. After establishing the Kullyspell House and Saleesh House fur trading posts in what are now Idaho and Montana, Thompson then attempted to expand further west. He sent out two trappers, Jacques Raphael Finlay and Finan McDonald, to construct a fur-trading post on the Spokane River in Washington and trade with the local Indians. This post was established in 1810, at the confluence of the Little Spokane and Spokane Rivers, becoming the first enduring European settlement of significance in Washington. Known as the Spokane House, or simply "Spokane", it was in operation from 1810 to 1826.

Spokane County was established by the Washington Territorial Legislature effective January 29, 1858, from a portion of Walla Walla County, which originally encompassed most of eastern Washington Territory between the Cascades and Rockies. The new county was bound to the west by the Columbia and Snake rivers and to the east by the Rockies; it included portions of modern-day Idaho and Montana. The territorial legislature designated the farm of Angus McLeod as the temporary county seat and appointed officials to several positions for Spokane County, but they never took office and did not organize a government. In late 1859, a group of settlers in the Bitterroot Valley petitioned to create their own county, which was not granted at that time; the territorial legislature reorganized Spokane County on January 17, 1860, with a seat on a land claim near Fort Colville.

The first county government met on May 8, 1860, and began conducting business. The eastern and southern portions of Spokane County were partitioned several times as new counties were created, beginning with Missoula County in December 1860 and followed by Shoshone County and Nez Perce County in 1861. These areas became part of the new Idaho Territory, which was organized by the U.S. Congress on March 3, 1863, and reduced the size of Spokane County even further. On January 19, 1864, the county was annexed into neighboring Stevens County, which had been created a year earlier from the northern portions of Walla Walla County. The seat of Stevens County was Pinkney City (now Colville) until it was temporarily relocated to the town of Spokane Falls (now Spokane) in 1875.

Spokane County was re-established on October 30, 1879, from the portions of Stevens County south of the Columbia, Spokane, and Wenatchee rivers. The western portion of the county was used to create Lincoln County, which was established on November 23, 1883. The first post office in the county was located at Spokane Bridge.

The selection of a permanent county seat was to be decided in an election in November 1880 between the growing cities of Cheney and Spokane Falls, both candidates for a major Northern Pacific Railway hub. The unofficial returns showed a 14-vote margin in favor of Cheney, but the result was disputed by county officials from Spokane Falls based on "irregularities" in the ballots. The official result had a margin of two or three votes for Spokane Falls, but Cheney residents demanded a recount, which was granted by a court order that was ignored by county officials in Spokane Falls. On March 21, 1881, a group of armed Cheney residents forcibly took custody of the county auditor, recount ballots, and other county records during a nighttime raid. After declaring their own recount had been in favor of Cheney as county seat, the records and the county auditor were moved from Spokane Falls; other government officials also moved to Cheney after a court order upheld the Cheney recount. A new ballot question in 1886 resulted in Spokane becoming the permanent county seat.

A proposal to create a consolidated city-county government in Spokane County was forwarded to a charter review commission in 1995 and placed on that year's ballot. It would have merged Spokane and other municipalities into the county government and created 13 districts that would be represented in a large county council. The consolidation charter was rejected by voters on November 7, 1995.

== Geography ==
According to the United States Census Bureau, the county has a total area of 1,780.984 square miles (4,612.73 km^{2}), of which 1,764.224 square miles (4,569.32 km^{2}) is land and 16.760 square miles (43.41 km^{2}) (0.94%) is water. It is the 19th largest county in Washington by total area.

The lowest point in the county is the Spokane River behind Long Lake Dam (boundary of Stevens County) at 1,538 feet (469 m) above sea level. (Virtually no change in elevation occurs between the dam and the mouth of the Little Spokane River inside Riverside State Park.) The highest point in the county is the summit of Mount Spokane at 5,887 ft (1,794 m) per NAVD 88.

Spokane County has a complex geologic history and varied topography. To the west is the barren landscape of the Columbia Basin and to the east are the foothills of the Rockies—the Coeur d'Alene Mountains, which rise to the east in northern Idaho. Spokane County lies in a transition area between the eastern edge of the basaltic Channeled Scablands steppe plains to the west and the rugged, timbered Rocky Mountain foothills to the east. The area exhibits signs of the prehistoric geologic events that shaped the area and region such as the Missoula Floods, which ended 12,000 to 15,000 years ago. The geography to the southeast, such as the Saltese Flats and Saltese Uplands is characterized as a shrub–steppe landscape with grassy hills and ravines.

In ecology, as with the topography, the county is also in a transition area, roughly split between the Columbia Plateau ecoregion in the southwest portion, where it is at the eastern edge of the basaltic Channeled Scablands steppe plain and the Northern Rockies ecoregion in the northwest portion, which is the rugged and forested Selkirk Mountains.

=== Rivers and streams ===
- Spokane River
  - Cable Creek
  - Latah Creek
    - Marshall Creek
    - Garden Springs Creek
  - Little Spokane River
  - Deep Creek
    - Coulee Creek
- Saltese Creek

=== Lakes and reservoirs ===
- Eloika Lake
- Liberty Lake
- Medical Lake
- West Medical Lake
- Newman Lake
- Shelley Lake

=== Notable summits and peaks ===
- Mount Spokane
- Mount Kit Carson
- Mica Peak
- Krell Hill

=== Notable parks ===
- Dishman Hills Natural Conservation Area
- Riverside State Park
- Riverfront Park
- Manito Park
- Mount Spokane State Park

=== National protected area ===
- Turnbull National Wildlife Refuge

=== Major highways ===
- Interstate 90
- U.S. Route 2
- U.S. Route 195
- U.S. Route 395
- State Route 27
- State Route 206
- State Route 290
- State Route 291
- State Route 902
- State Route 904

=== Adjacent counties ===
- Stevens County – northwest
- Pend Oreille County – north
- Bonner County, Idaho – northeast
- Kootenai County, Idaho – east
- Benewah County, Idaho – southeast
- Whitman County – south
- Lincoln County – west

== Demographics ==
Historical population
Census	Pop.	Note	%±
1860	996		—
1870	2,000		100.8%
1880	4,262		113.1%
1890	37,487		779.6%
1900	57,542		53.5%
1910	139,404		142.3%
1920	141,289		1.4%
1930	150,477		6.5%
1940	164,652		9.4%
1950	221,561		34.6%
1960	278,333		25.6%
1970	287,487		3.3%
1980	341,835		18.9%
1990	361,364		5.7%
2000	417,939		15.7%
2010	471,221		12.7%
2020	539,339		14.5%
2025 (est.)	558,344	▲	3.5%
U.S. Decennial Census:

=== Recent estimates ===
As of the second quarter of 2025, the median home value in Spokane County was $452,318.

As of the 2024 American Community Survey, there are 224,960 estimated households in Spokane County with an average of 2.5 persons per household. The county has a median household income of $86,205. Approximately 12.5% of the county's population lives at or below the poverty line. Spokane County has an estimated 59.0% employment rate, with 34.9% of the population holding a bachelor's degree or higher and 95.2% holding a high school diploma. There were 238,318 housing units at an average density of 0.21 per square mile (0.1/km^{2}).

The top five reported language (people were allowed to report up to two ancestries, thus the figures will generally add to more than 100%) were English (_%), Spanish (_%), Indo-European (_%), Asian and Pacific Islander (_%), and Other (_%).

The median age in the county was 38.7 years.

Spokane County, Washington – racial and ethnic composition Note: the US Census treats Hispanic/Latino as an ethnic category. This table excludes Latinos from the racial categories and assigns them to a separate category. Hispanics/Latinos may be of any race.
Race / ethnicity (NH = non-Hispanic)	Pop. 1980	Pop. 1990	Pop. 2000	Pop. 2010	Pop. 2020
White alone (NH)	323,170 (94.54%)	337,561 (93.41%)	375,427 (89.83%)	408,629 (86.72%)	431,806 (80.06%)
Black or African American alone (NH)	4,238 (1.24%)	4,972 (1.38%)	6,437 (1.54%)	7,714 (1.64%)	10,486 (1.94%)
Native American or Alaska Native alone (NH)	4,193 (1.23%)	5,216 (1.44%)	5,478 (1.31%)	6,478 (1.37%)	6,862 (1.27%)
Asian alone (NH)	3,911 (1.14%)	6,352 (1.76%)	7,758 (1.86%)	9,799 (2.08%)	12,404 (2.30%)
Pacific Islander alone (NH)	—	—	630 (0.15%)	1,817 (0.39%)	4,202 (0.78%)
Other race alone (NH)	1,512 (0.44%)	269 (0.07%)	598 (0.14%)	610 (0.13%)	2,644 (0.49%)
Mixed race or multiracial (NH)	—	—	10,050 (2.40%)	14,914 (3.16%)	35,585 (6.60%)
Hispanic or Latino (any race)	4,811 (1.41%)	6,994 (1.94%)	11,561 (2.77%)	21,260 (4.51%)	35,350 (6.55%)
Total	341,835 (100.00%)	361,364 (100.00%)	417,939 (100.00%)	471,221 (100.00%)	539,339 (100.00%)

=== 2020 census ===
As of the 2020 census, there were 539,339 people, 212,470 households, and 132,324 families residing in the county. Of the residents, 21.8% were under the age of 18 and 17.3% were 65 years of age or older; the median age was 38.0 years. For every 100 females there were 98.3 males, and for every 100 females age 18 and over there were 96.4 males. 85.4% of residents lived in urban areas and 14.6% lived in rural areas. The population density was 305.71 inhabitants per square mile (118.0/km^{2}) and there were 224,019 housing units at an average density of 126.98 per square mile (49.0/km^{2}); 5.2% of those units were vacant.

The racial makeup of the county was 82.1% White, 2.0% Black or African American, 1.5% American Indian and Alaska Native, 2.3% Asian, 0.8% Native Hawaiian and Pacific Islander, 2.2% from some other race, and 9.0% from two or more races. Hispanic or Latino residents of any race comprised 6.6% of the population.

There were 212,470 households in the county, of which 28.3% had children under the age of 18 living with them and 26.5% had a female householder with no spouse or partner present. About 29.1% of all households were made up of individuals and 11.8% had someone living alone who was 65 years of age or older. Among occupied housing units, 62.6% were owner-occupied and 37.4% were renter-occupied with a homeowner vacancy rate of 1.1% and a rental vacancy rate of 5.1%.

Females consisted of 50.1% of the county's population. 5.3% of the county's population were foreign-born persons. Of those 25 years or older, 94.2% of people in the county held a high school diploma, GED, or higher; 31.5% obtained a bachelor's degree or higher. Of those below the age of 65 years, 10.0% had a disability and 6.3% were without health insurance. The median household income was $64,079 (in 2021 dollars) and 11.2% of the county were living in poverty.

=== 2010 census ===
As of the 2010 census, there were 471,221 people, 187,167 households, 118,212 families residing in the county. The population density was 267.2 inhabitants per square mile (103.2/km^{2}). There were 201,434 housing units at an average density of 114.2 per square mile (44.1/km^{2}). The racial makeup of the county was 89.19% White, 1.71% African American, 1.55% Native American, 2.11% Asian, 0.40% Pacific Islander, 1.25% from some other races and 3.79% from two or more races. Hispanic or Latino people of any race were 4.51% of the population.

In terms of ancestry, 27.0% were German, 15.4% were Irish, 13.5% were English, 6.9% were Norwegian, and 4.4% were American.

There were 187,167 households, 30.9% had children under 18 living with them, 47.2% were married couples living together, 11.2% had a female householder with no husband present, and 36.8% were not families; 28.6% of all households were made up of individuals. The average household size was 2.44, and the average family size was 2.99. The median age was 36.8 years.

The median income for a household in the county was $47,250 and for a family was $59,999. Males had a median income of $44,000 versus $33,878 for females. The per capita income for the county was $25,127. About 9.1% of families and 14.1% of the population were below the poverty line, including 17.0% of those under age 18 and 8.5% of those age 65 or over.

=== 2000 census ===
As of the 2000 census, there were 417,939 people, 163,611 households, 106,019 families residing in the county. The population density was 237.0 inhabitants per square mile (91.5/km^{2}). There were 175,005 housing units at an average density of 99.0 per square mile (38.2/km^{2}). The racial makeup of the city was 88.62% White, 2.00% African American, 1.40% Native American, 1.88% Asian, 0.16% Pacific Islander, 0.82% from some other races and 2.76% from two or more races. Hispanic or Latino people of any race were 2.77% of the population.

In terms of ancestry, about 22.0% were of German, 10.7% Irish, 9.9% English, 7.6% American, and 6.4% Norwegian.

There were 163,611 households, 32.4% had children under 18 living with them, 49.9% were married couples living together, 11.0% had a female householder with no husband present, and 35.2% were not families. About 28.1% of all households were made up of individuals, and 9.6% had someone living alone who was 65 or older. The average household size was 2.46, and the average family size was 3.02.

In the county, the age distribution was 25.7% under 18, 10.6% from 18 to 24, 28.9% from 25 to 44, 22.4% from 45 to 64, and 12.4% who were 65 or older. The median age was 35 years. For every 100 females. there were 96.40 males. For every 100 females age 18 and over, there were 93.60 males.

The median income for a household in the county was $37,308, and for a family was $46,463. Males had a median income of $35,097 versus $25,526 for females. The per capita income for the county was $19,233. About 8.30% of families and 12.30% of the population were below the poverty line, including 14.20% of those under age 18 and 8.10% of those age 65 or over.

== Law and government ==
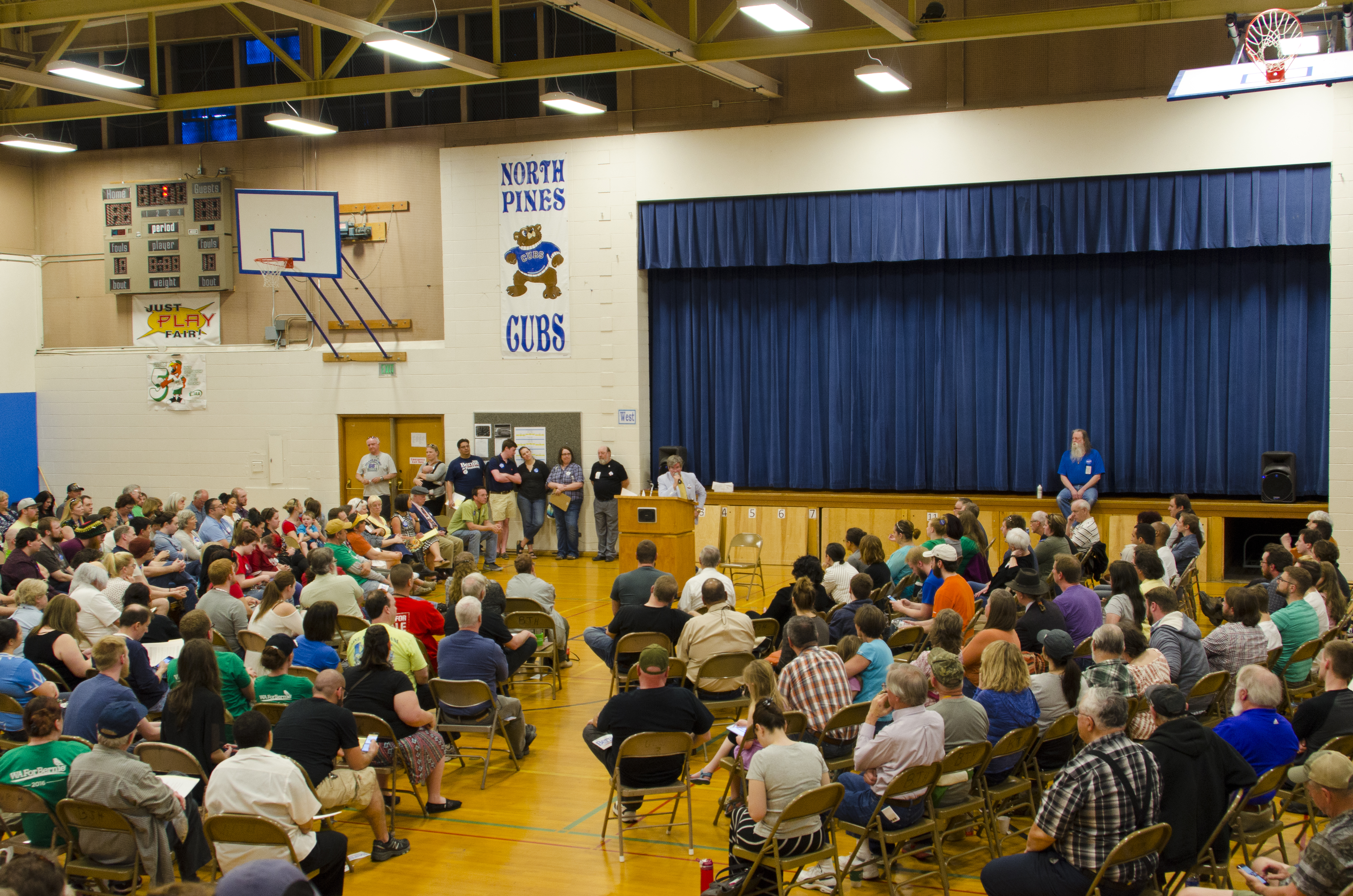
A Washington state 4th Legislative District Caucus

Spokane County is governed by a partisan board of county commissioners, one from each of five districts. They run in a partisan primary election within their own district, then compete countywide in the general election. Other elected officials include the sheriff, auditor (who is also responsible for elections), assessor, treasurer, and prosecutor, which are also partisan offices. Spokane County has an appointed medical examiner. In 2023, Spokane County expanded the number of County Commissioner seats from 3 to 5. As of January 2023, the current commissioners for Spokane County are Chris Jordan (Democrat), Amber Waldref (Democrat), Josh Kerns (Republican), Mary Kuney (Republican), and Al French (Republican), from the first, second, third, fourth, and fifth county districts, respectively. The previous sheriff was Ozzie D. Knezovich, who was appointed on April 11, 2006, and retired on December 31, 2022. The current elected Spokane County Sheriff is John Nowels, whose term began on January 1, 2023.

Transportation planning within the county is handled by the Spokane Regional Transportation Council, a metropolitan planning organization that was created in 1962. It distributes federal and state funds for transportation projects and updates the long-range transportation plan for Spokane County.

== Politics ==
Spokane County is rather conservative for an urban county, voting Republican for president all but three times since 1948. Democratic strength is concentrated in Spokane itself and in Cheney, which is home to Eastern Washington University, while the suburban areas are heavily Republican. The Republican edge has narrowed somewhat since the turn of the century. In the last five elections, the margin has been under 9% each time.

The county was one of two in Eastern Washington to vote for 2018 Washington Initiative 1639, which strengthened gun laws, along with neighboring Whitman County.

United States presidential election results for Spokane County, Washington
Year	Republican		Democratic		Third party(ies)	
Year	No.	%	No.	%	No.	%
1892	3,367	45.45%	2,247	30.33%	1,794	24.22%
1896	2,701	31.22%	5,829	67.37%	122	1.41%
1900	5,515	49.84%	5,125	46.32%	425	3.84%
1904	10,258	71.71%	2,602	18.19%	1,445	10.10%
1908	11,719	58.68%	6,557	32.83%	1,694	8.48%
1912	4,205	11.92%	10,845	30.75%	20,218	57.33%
1916	19,503	45.23%	21,339	49.49%	2,278	5.28%
1920	26,219	60.55%	13,412	30.97%	3,670	8.48%
1924	23,403	49.30%	6,036	12.71%	18,034	37.99%
1928	35,858	65.48%	18,527	33.83%	373	0.68%
1932	24,848	38.15%	36,953	56.74%	3,324	5.10%
1936	19,951	28.45%	48,117	68.62%	2,057	2.93%
1940	33,228	42.17%	44,852	56.92%	713	0.90%
1944	36,359	44.18%	45,491	55.27%	456	0.55%
1948	37,086	41.68%	49,649	55.79%	2,253	2.53%
1952	56,958	55.17%	45,827	44.39%	451	0.44%
1956	60,335	55.21%	48,833	44.68%	119	0.11%
1960	59,557	51.62%	55,553	48.15%	259	0.22%
1964	49,387	44.26%	62,092	55.65%	102	0.09%
1968	52,650	47.61%	49,423	44.69%	8,521	7.70%
1972	74,320	59.37%	44,337	35.42%	6,528	5.21%
1976	68,290	53.37%	55,660	43.50%	4,004	3.13%
1980	78,096	55.51%	49,263	35.02%	13,326	9.47%
1984	88,043	58.96%	59,620	39.92%	1,673	1.12%
1988	68,787	49.43%	68,520	49.24%	1,843	1.32%
1992	59,984	35.47%	69,526	41.11%	39,622	23.43%
1996	66,628	41.84%	71,727	45.05%	20,877	13.11%
2000	89,299	51.88%	74,604	43.35%	8,209	4.77%
2004	111,606	55.09%	87,490	43.19%	3,491	1.72%
2008	108,314	49.34%	105,786	48.19%	5,411	2.47%
2012	115,285	51.51%	102,295	45.70%	6,250	2.79%
2016	113,435	48.06%	93,767	39.72%	28,848	12.22%
2020	148,576	50.29%	135,765	45.96%	11,089	3.75%
2024	145,338	50.63%	131,163	45.69%	10,581	3.69%

=== Flag and symbols ===
The 1988 County flag, no longer in use

The county government adopted an official flag in 1988 following a public design contest sponsored by the Spokane County Centennial Commission. The winning entry from Stephanie Bumgarner-Ott, the daughter of state legislator Gary Bumgarner, depicts the ceremonial headdress of the Spokane people against a yellow sun; the background is green with a diagonal blue stripe to represent the Spokane River. The flag was sent for display at the Washington State Capitol for the state centennial in 1989 and 25 copies were made at a cost of $1,751.75; it was used for official events, including the funeral of a county commissioner, but was not on permanent display in Spokane County buildings. One copy of the flag was stored in a vault in the county courthouse until 1995 and later lost again. The county government announced plans to decommission the design in 2002 and hold a new public contest due to the original flag's appearance, which was deemed potentially offensive to Native Americans. A new county seal was adopted in 2005 that depicts the county courthouse.

== Communities ==
=== Cities ===
- Airway Heights
- Cheney
- Deer Park
- Liberty Lake
- Medical Lake
- Millwood
- Spangle
- Spokane (county seat)
- Spokane Valley

=== Towns ===
- Fairfield
- Latah
- Rockford
- Waverly

=== Census-designated places ===
- Country Homes
- Fairchild Air Force Base
- Fairwood
- Four Lakes
- Mead
- Otis Orchards-East Farms
- Town and Country

=== Unincorporated communities ===
- Amber
- Buckeye
- Chattaroy
- Chester
- Colbert
- Deep Creek
- Denison
- Duncan
- Dynamite
- Elk
- Espanola
- Freeman
- Garden Springs
- Geiger Heights
- Glenrose
- Greenacres
- Green Bluff
- Hazard
- Highland
- Manito
- Marshall
- Mica
- Milan
- Moab
- Mount Hope
- Newman Lake
- Nine Mile Falls
- Orchard Prairie
- Peone
- Plaza
- Riverside
- Seven Mile
- Silver Lake
- Spokane Bridge
- Spring Valley
- Stringtown
- Tyler
- Valleyford
- Veradale

==== Ghost towns/neighborhoods ====
- Babb
- Coey
- Darknell
- Dragoon
- Freedom
- Geib
- Hite
- Lyons
- Mock
- North Pine
- Rahm
- Rodna
- Saxby
- Scribner
- Wallner

== Education ==
School districts in the county include:

- Central Valley School District
- Cheney School District
- Deer Park School District
- East Valley School District (Spokane)
- Freeman School District
- Great Northern School District
- Liberty School District
- Mead School District
- Medical Lake School District
- Newport School District
- Nine Mile Falls School District
- Orchard Prairie School District
- Reardan-Edwall School District
- Riverside School District
- Rosalia School District
- Spokane Public Schools
- St. John School District
- Tekoa School District
- West Valley School District (Spokane)

Community colleges include:

- Spokane Community College
- Spokane Falls Community College

Universities include:

- Eastern Washington University
- Gonzaga University
- Washington State University
- Whitworth University
- University of Washington

== See also ==
- National Register of Historic Places listings in Spokane County, Washington
- List of counties in Washington
