= Shelley Lake =

- Location within Washington (state) Location within the United States
- Location: Spokane Valley, WA, United States
- Coordinates: 47°39′05″N 117°11′06″W
- Lake type: open lake
- Primary inflows: Saltese Creek
- Primary outflows: Spokane Valley–Rathdrum Prairie Aquifer
- Basin countries: United States
- Max. length: 1,600 feet (490 m)
- Max. width: 1,300 feet (400 m)
- Max. depth: 15 feet (4.6 m)
- Surface elevation: 2,008 feet (612 m)
- Settlements: Spokane Valley

Shelley Lake is a small lake located entirely in the city of Spokane Valley, in the U.S. state of Washington. The lake is surrounded on three sides by the 248 lot gated community of Shelley Lake Estates. The lake is kept full by Saltese Creek, which is supplied by drainage canals from the Saltese Flats. Although an open lake, there are no above-ground outflows.

== Geography ==
Shelley Lake is located in the Veradale area of the city of Spokane Valley approximately one-half mile south of Sprague Avenue, the main east–west surface street in the Valley. The lake is located on the relatively flat floor of the Spokane Valley, just below hills which rise to the south into the uplands which comprise most of the lake's drainage basin. The lake itself is located at 2,008 feet above sea level.

Saltese Creek flows into Shelley Lake from the southeast and drains a mostly suburban, exurban, agricultural and rural area from the Saltese Flats to the Saltese Uplands and the northwest face of Mica Peak above that. The area immediately surrounding the lake is of a suburban nature, with most of the shoreline occupied by the Shelley Lake Estates gated community. The eastern shore is dominated by a hillside that is a separate private property. Public access to the lake through Shelley Lake Estates is limited to residents and their guests. Shelley Lake has no natural surface outlet, with water instead leaving the lake through evaporation or as groundwater recharge into the Spokane Valley-Rathdrum Prairie Aquifer.

== See also ==
- Liberty Lake
