= Ellerport Airport =

- IATA: none; ICAO: none; FAA LID: WN54

Summary
- Owner: Eller's Airpark Homeowner's Assoc
- Operator: Eller's Airpark Homeowner's Assoc.
- Serves: Newman Lake, Washington
- Location: Newman Lake, Washington
- Built: 1985
- Elevation AMSL: 654 m / 2,146 ft
- Coordinates: 47°44.09′N 117°04.28′W
- Interactive map of Ellerport Airport

Runways
| Direction | Length | | Surface |
| Direction | ft | m | Surface |
|---|---|---|---|
| 1-19 | 3,800 | 1,158 | asphalt |

Ellerport Airport (ICAO: WN54) is a privately owned airport in Newman Lake, Washington. It is situated on five acres of land.
