= Little Spokane River =

Coordinates: 47°53′5.2″N 117°21′33.1″W

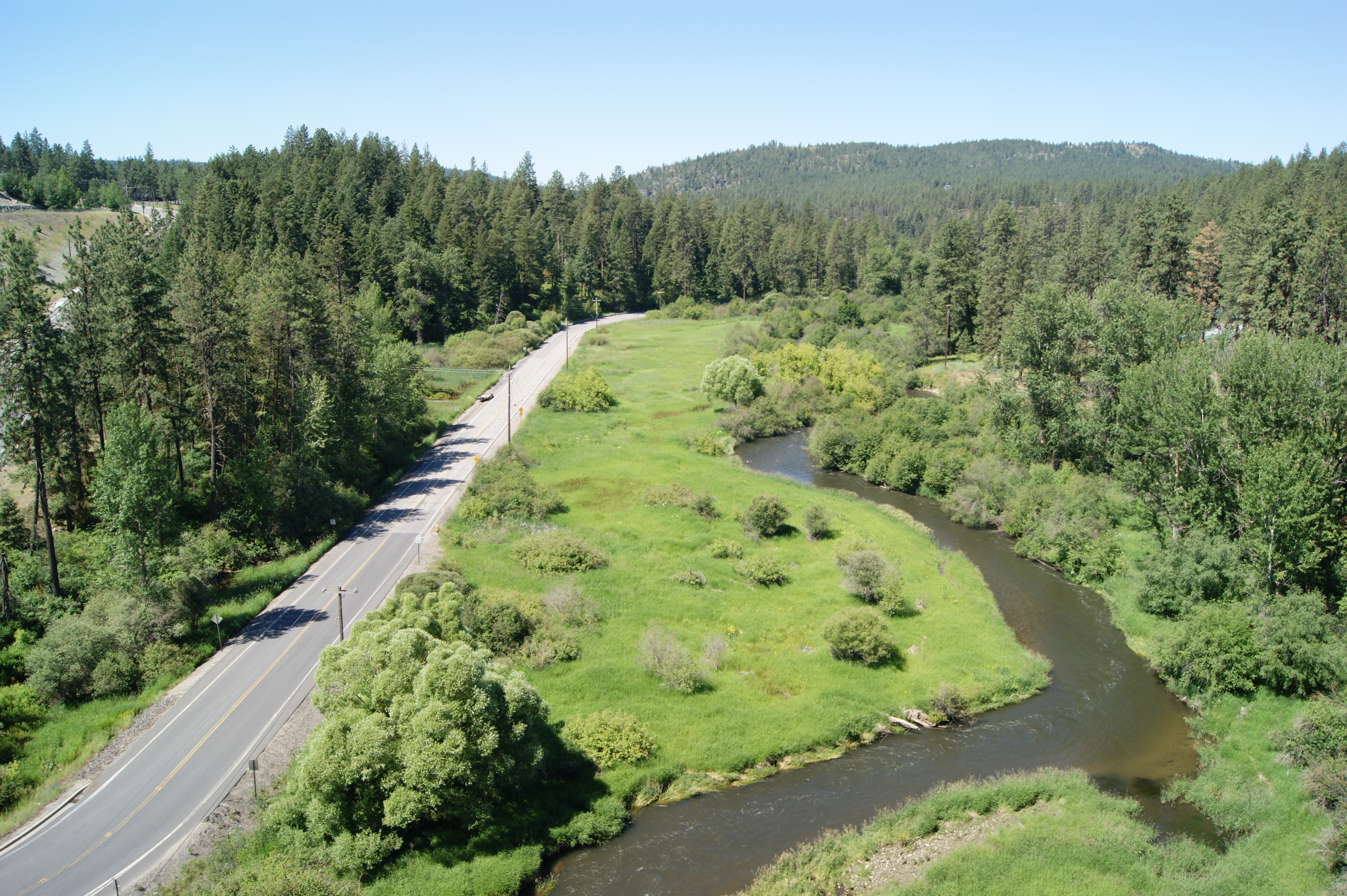
- Little Spokane River at Dartford

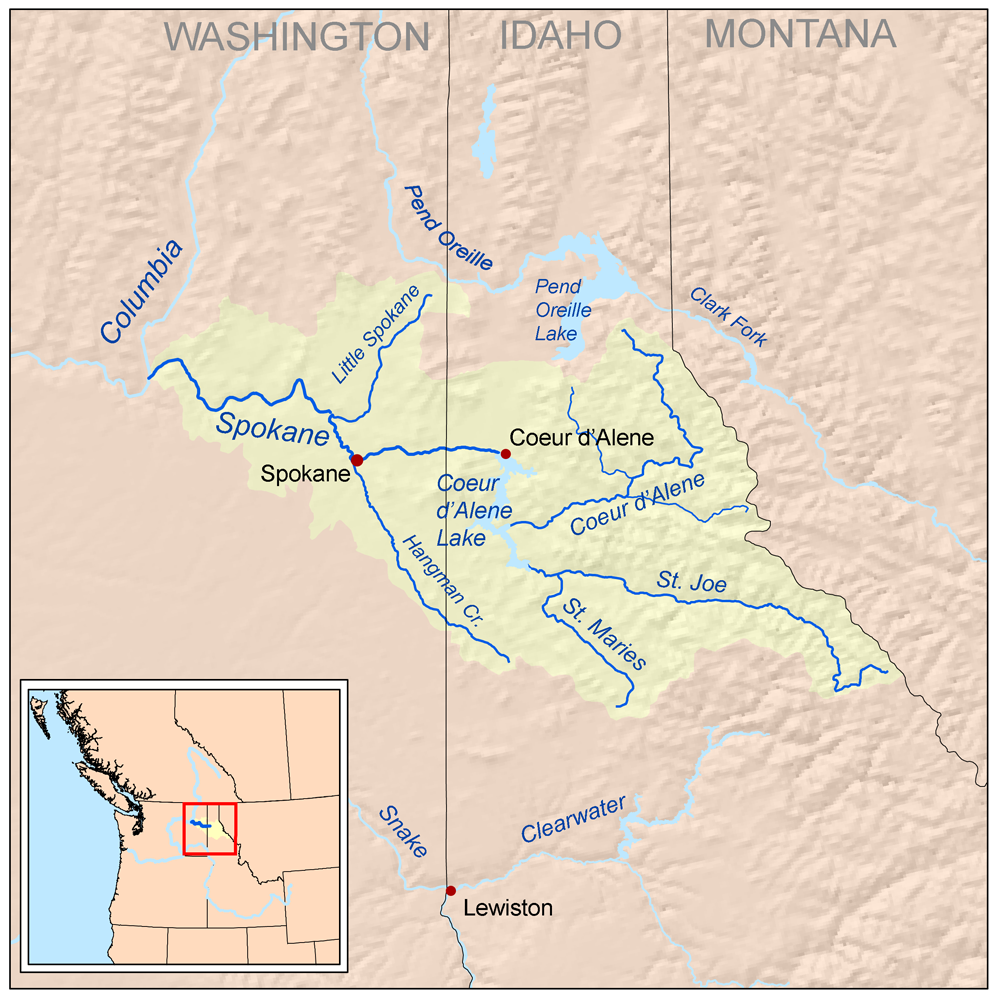

Location
- Country: United States
- State: Washington
- Counties: Spokane, Pend Oreille

Physical characteristics
- Length: 35 miles (56 km)

Basin features
- Waterbodies: Eloika Lake

The Little Spokane River is a major tributary of the Spokane River, approximately 35 miles (56 km) long, in eastern Washington in the United States. It drains a rural area of forested foothills and a farming valley north of the city of Spokane along the Idaho–Washington border. It has two branches, one starting west of Newport and the other stemming from Eloika Lake farther west.

The two branches come together between the communities of Elk upstream and Milan downstream. The supply from Eloika is quite warm in the summer and has different fish habitat than the colder branch from Newport.

It rises in southern Pend Oreille County, south of Newport near the Idaho state line. It flows south-southwest past the communities of Elk, Milan, Chattaroy, Buckeye, Colbert, Dartford and Fairwood. It joins the Spokane River from the east approximately 10 miles (16 km) northwest of Spokane. Between Fairwood and the confluence the stream flows through a natural area with an Indian painted rock, several trails to walk on and berths for canoes and kayaks, though swimming and inflatable rafts are prohibited The Spokane House historical site was located where the Little Spokane and Spokane Rivers come together. The speed and depth varies in the river but is generally slow moving and 2 to 5 feet (0.6 to 1.5 m) deep. The river has an average width of 40 to 60 feet (12 to 18 m). The river is one of only two waterways in Washington state where the waterway itself is not public and is owned by the landowners of the abutting property.

== Fish ==
The Little Spokane River contains both native and introduced fish species. Redband trout, rainbow trout are residualzied from anadromous steelhead, while suckerfish migrated from Spokane River, pikeminnow, longnose dace, speckled dace, sculpin and native mountain whitefish are indigenous. Due to the once-anadromous coastal rainbow trout now sharing spawning time with the residential redband trout, the trout found in this river are most often hybridized and neither genetically pure redband nor coastal rainbow. Strict rules are placed for the winter whitefish season. Many cold and warm-water non-native fish species have been introduced into the river basin. The non-native fish species listed by Washington Department of Ecology are brook trout, brown trout, grass pickerel, pumpkinseed, green sunfish, largemouth bass, tench, yellow bullhead, and yellow perch. It is probable that these non native fish were introduced through upper portions of the watershed basin such as Eloika, Chain, Sacheen, and Horseshoe Lakes, all of which contain the listed non-native fish.

=== Fishing on the Little Spokane River ===
Flyfishing is popular on The Little Spokane River but standard angling does work and is legal.

== Human Activities ==
In 1893, the ichthyologists Charles Gilbert and Barton Warren Evermann reported extensive damage to the Little Spokane as a result of human activities:

"The character of this stream is being materially changed by the advent of civilization, a fact which is, or has been, true of most streams in this country. The cutting away of the timber and brush on the immediate bank and the cultivation of the land within the drainage area of the stream have greatly increased the surface erosion and, in consequence, the impurities of the stream."

== See also ==
- Missoula floods
- List of rivers of Washington (state)
- Spokane River
