= Saltese Creek =

Location
- Country: United States
- State: Washington
- County: Spokane

Physical characteristics
- Source: Saltese Flats
  - location: Spokane County, Washington
  - coordinates: 47°37′49″N 117°07′43″W
  - elevation: 4,557 ft (1,389 m)
- Mouth: Shelley Lake at
  - location: Spokane Valley, Washington
  - coordinates: 47°39′05″N 117°11′05″W

Basin features
- Tributaries
  - right: Quinnamose Creek

Saltese Creek is an approximately 9 mi (14 km) long stream in Spokane County, Washington, United States. Originally only 3.5 miles (5.6 km), the lower 5.5 miles (8.9 km) of the stream, along with around 10 mi (16 km) of drainage canals were dug to drain Saltese Lake. The stream now functions as one of two primary inflows (the other being Quinnamose Creek), as well as the primary outflow for the Saltese Flats (the residual wetlands of the drained lake). The stream has its headwaters near the summit of Mica Peak and terminates at Shelley Lake, which was created as a result of draining Saltese Lake.
