= Amber, Washington =

Unincorporated community in Washington, United States

- Unincorporated community
- Location within Washington (state)
- Coordinates: 47°21′07″N 117°42′42″W
- Country: United States
- State: Washington
- County: Spokane
- Elevation: 2,251 ft (686 m)
- Time zone: UTC-8 (Pacific (PST))
  - Summer (DST): UTC-7 (PDT)
- ZIP code: 99004
- GNIS feature ID: 1511963

Amber is an unincorporated community in Spokane County, Washington, United States. The town is located along Amber Lake. Amber is assigned the ZIP code 99004.

Originally the town and lake were named Calvert, for Samuel Calvert, who moved to this area in the 1890s. A post office was established nearby by Bartley Costello in 1909, who named it Amber. It remained in operation until 1975. The town changed its name during the 1910s to Amber (and then changed the lake name to Amber) to avoid confusion and expedite the mail service.
