= Spokane metropolitan area =

Spokane Metropolitan Area
- Metropolitan Statistical Area
- Spokane–Spokane Valley, WA; Metropolitan Statistical Area
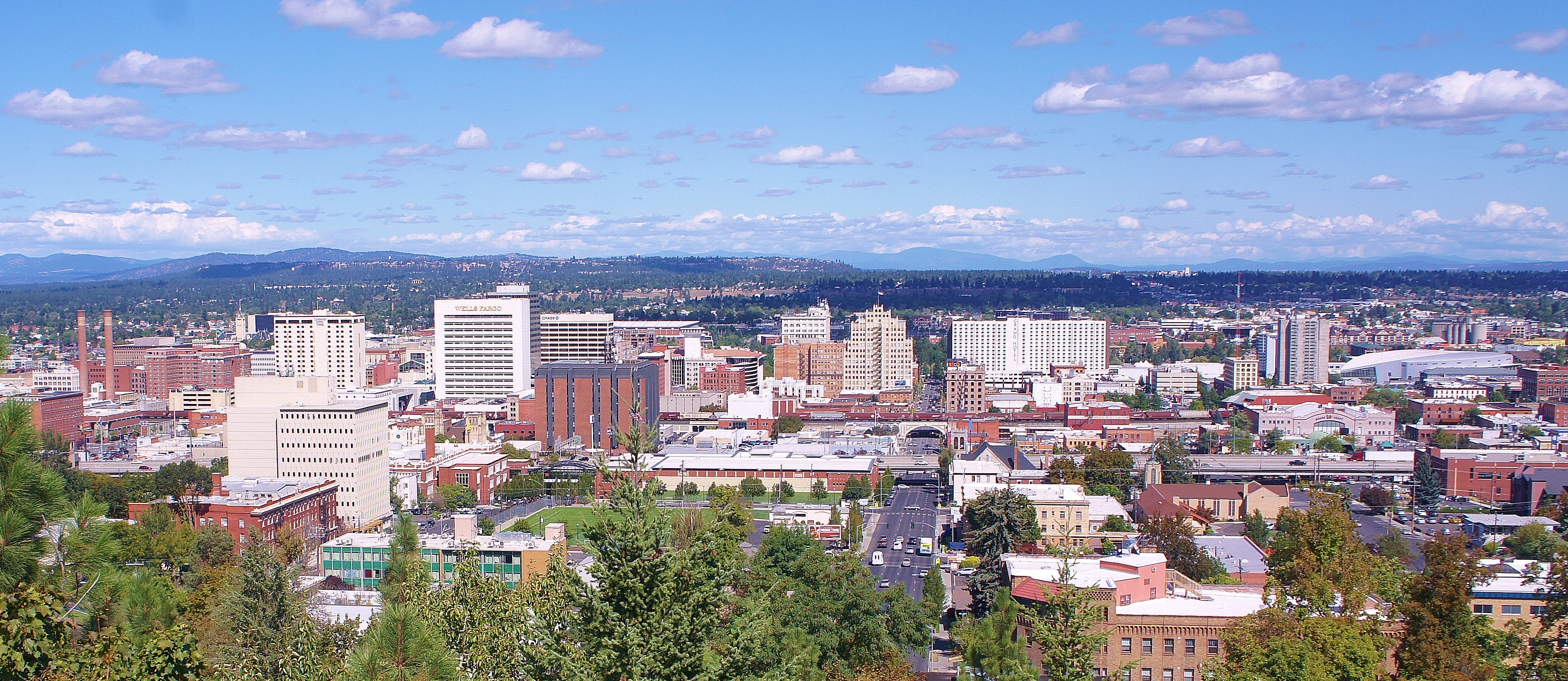
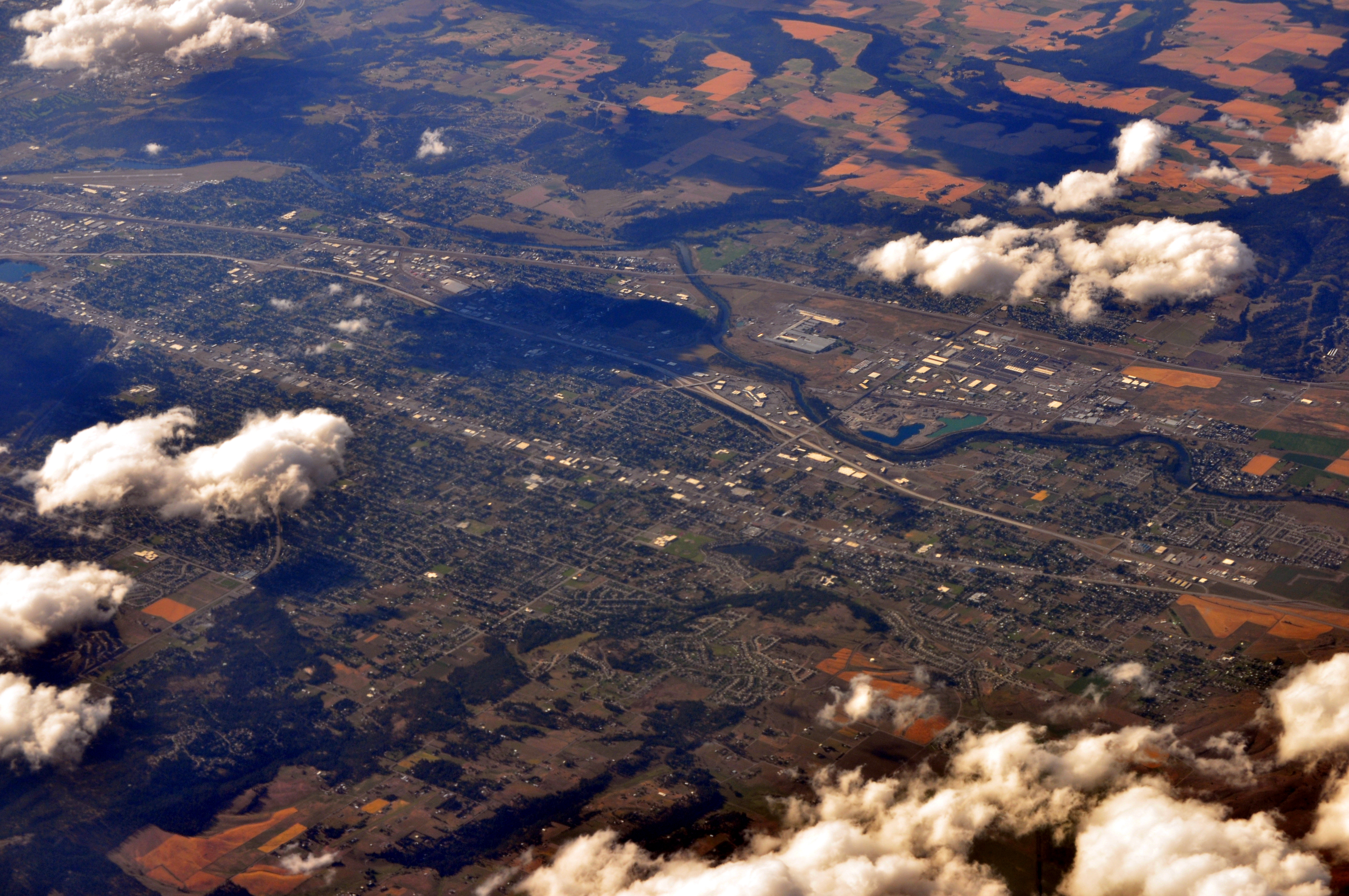
- From top: Downtown Spokane from the south, Spokane Valley from the air
Map of Spokane–Spokane Valley–
Coeur d'Alene, WA–ID CSA
City of Spokane, WA
Spokane–Spokane Valley, WA MSA
City of Coeur d'Alene, ID
Coeur d'Alene, ID MSA
- Country: United States
- State: Washington; Idaho
- Largest city: Spokane, WA (228,989)
- Other cities: Spokane Valley, WA (102,976); Cheney, WA (13,255); Liberty Lake, WA (12,003); Airway Heights, WA (10,757)

Area
  - Total: 5,641.5 sq mi (14,611 km^{2})
- Highest elevation: 7,320 ft (2,230 m)
- Lowest elevation: 1,109 ft (338 m)

Population
  - Total: 593,466
  - Rank: 98th in the U.S.

GDP
  - Total: $35.689 billion (2022)
- Time zone: UTC-8 (PST)
  - Summer (DST): UTC-7 (PDT)

The Spokane–Spokane Valley Metropolitan Statistical Area, as defined by the United States Census Bureau, is an area consisting of Spokane and Stevens counties in Washington state, anchored by the city of Spokane and its largest suburb, Spokane Valley. As of July 1, 2025, the MSA had an estimated population of 608,012. The Spokane Metropolitan Area and the neighboring Coeur d'Alene metropolitan area, make up the larger Spokane–Coeur d'Alene combined statistical area. The urban areas of the two MSAs largely follow the path of Interstate 90 between Spokane and Coeur d'Alene. In 2010, the Spokane–Spokane Valley MSA had a gross metropolitan product of $20.413 billion.

== Counties ==
- Spokane
- Stevens

== Communities ==
=== Over 200,000 inhabitants ===
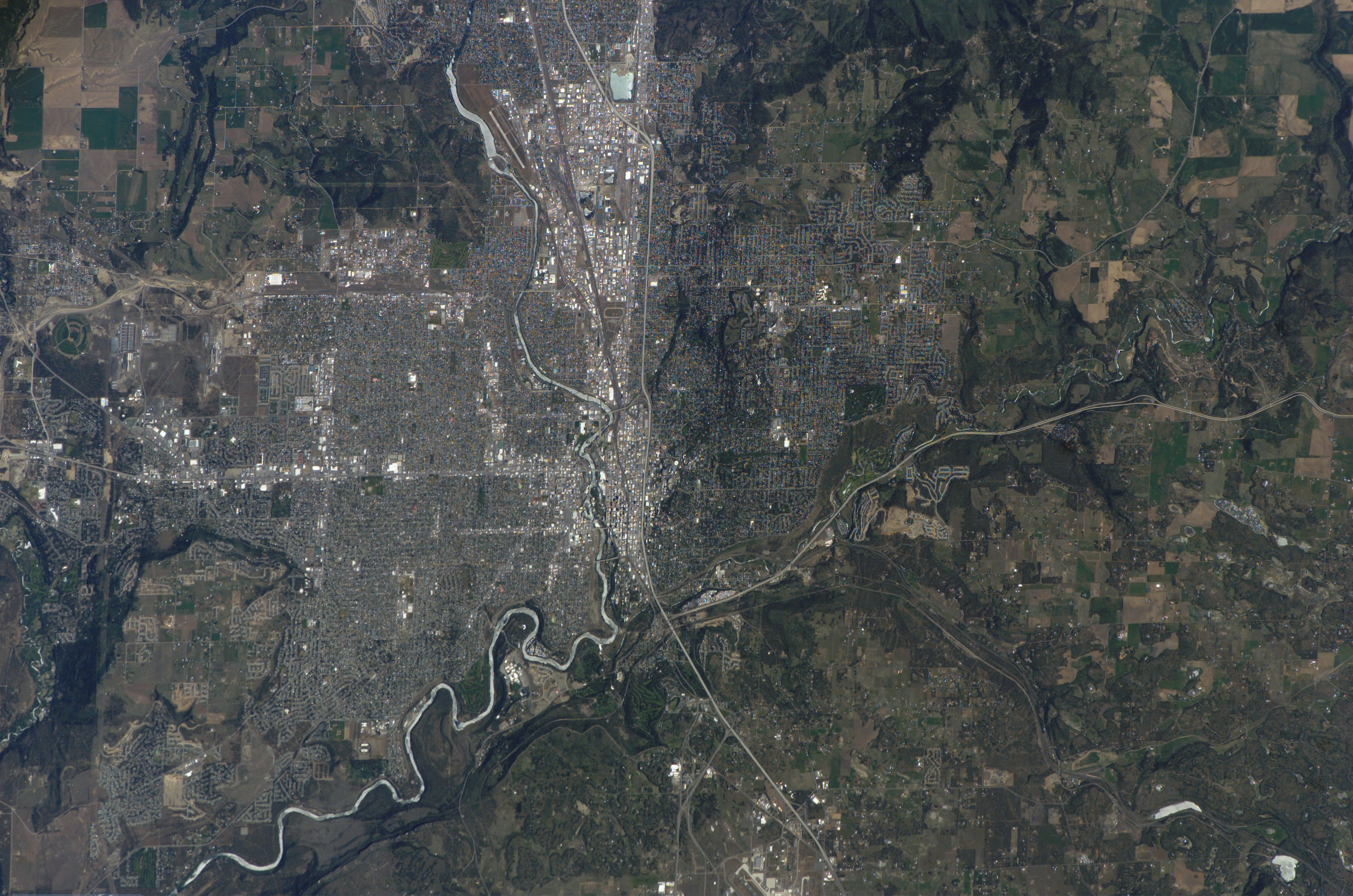
Spokane photographed from space on the 15th expedition to the International Space Station

- Spokane – (principal city)

=== 50,000 to 199,999 inhabitants ===
- Spokane Valley – (principal city)

=== 10,000 to 49,999 inhabitants ===
- Airway Heights
- Cheney
- Fairwood
- Liberty Lake

=== 5,000 to 9,999 inhabitants ===
- Country Homes
- Fairchild AFB
- Mead
- Medical Lake
- Otis Orchards-East Farms
- Suncrest
- Town and Country

=== 1,000 to 4,999 inhabitants ===
- Chewelah
- Colville
- Deer Park
- Kettle Falls
- Millwood

=== 1,000 inhabitants or fewer ===
- Addy
- Clayton
- Fairfield
- Four Lakes
- Green Bluff
- Latah
- Loon Lake
- Marcus
- Northport
- Rockford
- Spangle
- Springdale
- Waverly
- Valley

=== Unincorporated places ===
- Amber
- Arden
- Bluecreek
- Cedonia
- Chattaroy
- Colbert
- Dartford
- Deep Creek
- Denison
- Echo
- Elk
- Espanola
- Evans
- Ford
- Four Lakes
- Freedom
- Freeman
- Fruitland
- Gifford
- Geiger Heights
- Glenrose
- Green Bluff
- Greenacres
- Hunters
- Lakeside
- Marshall
- Mead
- Mica
- Milan
- Newman Lake
- Nine Mile Falls
- Onion Creek
- Orchard Prairie
- Plaza
- Peone
- Rice
- Ruby
- Spokane Bridge
- Tumtum (also known as Tum Tum)
- Tyler
- Valleyford
- Wellpinit

== Demographics ==
As of 2020, there were 585,784 people and 224,385 households residing within the MSA. The racial makeup of the MSA was 86% White, 2% Black, 1% Native, 2% Asian, 0% Islander, and 5% Hispanic. According to the Association of Religion Data Archives' 2010 Metro Area Membership Report, the denominational affiliations of the Spokane MSA are 64,277 Evangelical Protestant, 682 Black Protestant, 24,826 Mainline Protestant, 754 Orthodox, 66,202 Catholic, 31,674 Other, and 339,338 Unclaimed.

County	Seat	2025 estimate	2020 Census	Change	Area	Density
Spokane	Spokane	558,344	539,339	+3.52%	1,781 sq mi (4,610 km^{2})	314/sq mi (121/km^{2})
Stevens	Colville	49,668	46,445	+6.94%	2,541 sq mi (6,580 km^{2})	20/sq mi (8/km^{2})
Total		608,012	585,784	+3.79%	4,322 sq mi (11,190 km^{2})	141/sq mi (54/km^{2})

Historical population
Census	Pop.	Note	%±
1860	1,992		—
1870	2,734		37.2%
1880	5,507		101.4%
1890	41,828		659.5%
1900	68,058		62.7%
1910	164,701		142.0%
1920	169,257		2.8%
1930	176,182		4.1%
1940	191,083		8.5%
1950	247,554		29.6%
1960	303,131		22.5%
1970	310,197		2.3%
1980	379,394		22.3%
1990	401,227		5.8%
2000	469,737		17.1%
2010	527,753		12.4%
2020	585,784		11.0%
2025 (est.)	608,012		3.8%
U.S. Decennial Census

== See also ==
- Washington census statistical areas
