= Peone, Washington =

Unincorporated community in Washington, United States

- Unincorporated community
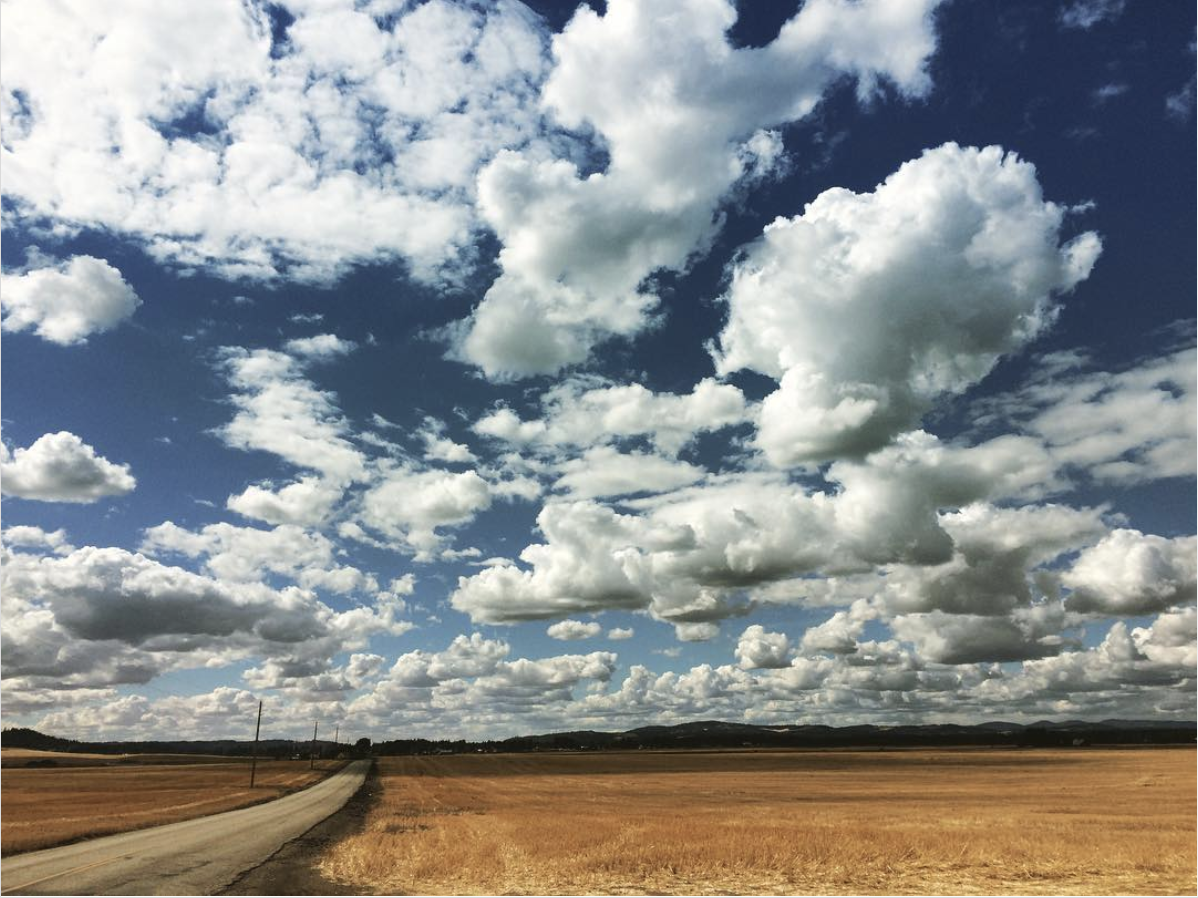
- Peone Prairie from Peone Road

- Location within Washington (state)
- Coordinates: 47°48′08″N 117°13′45″W
- Country: United States
- State: Washington
- County: Spokane
- Elevation: 1,865 ft (568 m)
- Time zone: UTC-8 (Pacific (PST))
  - Summer (DST): UTC-7 (PDT)
- ZIP code: 99021
- Area code: 509
- GNIS feature ID: 1511223

Peone is an unincorporated community in Spokane County, in the U.S. state of Washington.

== Geography ==
Peone is located in the northeastern corner of the Peone Prairie, where the rolling and open farmland meets the foothills of Mount Spokane, at an elevation of 1,865 feet above sea level. Deadman Creek emerges from the mountains and onto the prairie at Peone. Washington State Route 206 runs through the community, traveling from Mead, Washington on the west and up into Mount Spokane State Park on the east.

The Peone Prairie opens up to the southwest of Peone. There is little visible distinction between the community site of Peone and the rest of the prairie at present. The entire area is dominated by farmland with homes spaced well apart.

Peone is a 30-minute drive from Downtown Spokane, located 16 miles to the southwest. North of Peone and at a higher elevation is the community of Green Bluff, Washington.

== History ==
A post office called Peone was established in 1883, and remained in operation until 1933. The community was named after a Peone Indian tribal chief.

Due to its proximity to Spokane and its suburbs, the rural character of the Peone area has been changing in recent decades. The once firmly rural area has seen an increase in residential development that has brought an increasingly exurban flavor to the community.
