= KEWU-FM =

- Cheney, Washington; United States
- Broadcast area: Spokane metropolitan area
- Frequency: 89.5 MHz
- Branding: Kool 89.5

Programming
- Format: Oldies
- Affiliations: Compass Media Networks

Ownership
- Owner: Eastern Washington University; (pending sale to Oldies Preservation Society)
- Operator: Oldies Preservation Society
- Sister stations: KPKL

History
- First air date: April 7, 1950; (on low power AM signal); November 11, 1963; (on 89.5 FM)
- Former call signs: KEWC (1950-1963)
- Call sign meaning: Eastern Washington University

Technical information
- Licensing authority: FCC
- Facility ID: 18391
- Class: C1
- ERP: 10,000 watts
- HAAT: 429 meters (1,407 ft)
- Transmitter coordinates: 47°34′42.6″N 117°17′53.7″W

Links
- Public license information: Public file; LMS
- Webcast: Listen live
- Website: www.koolops.org

KEWU-FM (89.5 MHz, Kool 89.5) is a radio station licensed to Cheney, Washington, serving the Spokane metropolitan area. The station is owned by Eastern Washington University (EWU), and operated by the Oldies Preservation Society. It airs an oldies radio format. KEWU-FM has an effective radiated power of 10,000 watts.

== History ==
The university station went on the air on April 7, 1950, as KEWC, a 10-watt AM station. On November 11, 1963, the station moved to the FM Band as KEWU-FM.

In 1986, the station's transmitting power was increased to 10,000 watts, and its format was changed to jazz. Since then, KEWU had featured more than 150 hours of classic and contemporary jazz weekly, while also expanding its offerings to include related genres, such as Big Band, Latin Jazz, and Blues.

Over the years, the station had received recognition for the quality of its programming. In 2005 and 2015, JazzWeek magazine named KEWU the Best Small Market Jazz station in the U.S., while also honoring program director Elizabeth Farriss as the Best Small Market Jazz Programmer in 2005, 2009, and 2015.

In the summer of 2023, the university announced it would cease operating the station in a process that would ultimately last into 2024, when the sale of the station's license was formally announced with an intended mid-2025 completion. In preparation, the university donated KEWU's music library to Spokane Public Radio. On February 24, 2025, it was announced that an agreement was reached with the Oldies Preservation Society to acquire the station. Oldies Preservation Society began programming the station on October 1, 2025.
