= KBNW-FM =

Radio station in Deer Park–Spokane, Washington

- Deer Park, Washington; United States
- Broadcast area: Spokane metropolitan area
- Frequency: 107.1 MHz
- Branding: News Radio KBNW

Programming
- Format: News/Talk

Ownership
- Owner: Robert Anthony and Patricia Fogal; (Spokane Broadcasting Company, LLC)
- Operator: HBG-Spokane I, LLC
- Sister stations: KSBN

History
- First air date: September 1983
- Former call signs: KNOI (1983–1986); KAZZ (1986–2012); KPKL (2012–2026)

Technical information
- Licensing authority: FCC
- Facility ID: 3922
- Class: C3
- ERP: 25,000 watts
- HAAT: 100 meters (330 ft)
- Transmitter coordinates: 48°01′45″N 117°35′57″W
- Repeater: 107.1 KBNW-FM1 (Spokane)

Links
- Public license information: Public file; LMS
- Webcast: Listen live
- Website: www.myinlandnorthwest.com

KBNW-FM (107.1 FM) is a radio station licensed to Deer Park, Washington, and serving the Spokane metropolitan area. The station is airing a news/talk radio format. The broadcast license is held by Robert Anthony and Patricia Fogal, through licensee Spokane Broadcasting Company, LLC, and the station is operated by HBG-Spokane I, LLC.

KBNW-FM's studios and offices are located at the Northtown Office Building in Spokane, WA. The transmitter is in Loon Lake, Washington, of U.S. Route 395. KBNW-FM also operates a booster station licensed to Spokane (5,000 watt KBNW-FM1) transmitting from a tower in Airway Heights, WA. Due to financial problems, the station was off the air under previous owners for twelve months in 2008-2009 and nine months in 2012.

== History ==
In September 1983, the station first signed on as KNOI. It was owned by Tri-County Broadcasting and aired an adult contemporary music format. The power at first was only 3,000 watts, so it did not reach most of the Spokane radio market from its Deer Park location.

On April 1, 1986, the station was assigned the KAZZ call sign by the Federal Communications Commission (FCC). The station featured veteran 1970s WHYI Miami DJs Mark In The Dark and Big Al, and also included local radio veterans JP Bzet and Dean Jaxson. On February 29, 1994, the station aired a children's radio format, as a Radio AAHS Network affiliate, the only FM station on the network.

According to the FCC records, the station went dark on June 4, 2008. On June 16, 2008, it applied for special temporary authority (STA) to "remain silent" which was granted on July 9, 2008. The reason given in the application was "a secured creditor has seized transmitting equipment necessary to the operation of the station." Per the FCC notification, KAZZ's license would automatically expire as a matter of law if broadcast operations did not resume by 12:01 a.m. on June 5, 2009. KAZZ stayed off the air for almost a year.

In May 2009, an application was filed with the FCC for the involuntary assignment of the KAZZ broadcast license from Proactive Communications, Inc., to Nancy L. Isserlis, acting as receiver for KAZZ. The transfer was approved by the FCC on May 15, 2009, and the transaction was consummated on the same day. The station resumed broadcasting in June 2009, with a classic hits music format branded as "K-HITS."

KAZZ fell silent again on March 2, 2012, due to financial problems. This time, the station was off the air for nine months. On September 26, 2012, KAZZ's license was transferred to Robert Anthony and Patricia Fogal's Spokane Broadcasting Company, LLC, for consideration of $450,000. The station's call sign was changed the same day to KPKL. KPKL went back on the air on November 12, at first stunting with Christmas music. In 2018, a non-profit was formed, the Oldies Preservation Society (OPS), in order to solicit listener donations on-air in order to maintain station operations. On February 24, 2025, it was announced that OPS would buy Cheney-licensed station KEWU from Eastern Washington University and move KPKL's format over to that station. Oldies Preservation Society began operating KEWU on October 1, 2025. In an edition of the OPS' e-mail newsletter, they stated that their programming of KPKL would continue to at least the end of 2025, with the format switching to Christmas music on November 1 as "a great way to close the 1071FM Chapter".

HBG-Spokane I, LLC began operating KPKL-FM under a Local Marketing Agreement on January 1, 2026. The call sign was changed to KBNW-FM on April 14, 2026.

On May 8, 2026, KBNW-FM launched a news/talk format, branded as "107.1 FM | 1230 AM News Radio KBNW". The station features 29 hours of local news programming each week, featuring Spokane's Morning News, Spokane's Afternoon News, local news updates at the top and bottom of each hour and MyInlandNorthwest This Week (weekly public affairs program). Syndicated programs include Armstrong and Getty, The Lars Larson Show (Northwest version) and The Ramsey Show. The station is affiliated with ABC Radio News (top of hour) and World Wide News Network (bottom of the hour). News Radio KBNW also airs University of Idaho football, men's basketball and weekly coaches shows.
