= Peone =

Peone may refer to:

- Peone, Washington, a community in the United States
- Péone, a commune in France
