= KSBN (AM) =

Simulcast with KBNW-FM Deer Park
- Spokane, Washington; United States
- Broadcast area: Spokane metropolitan area
- Frequency: 1230 kHz
- Branding: News Radio KBNW

Programming
- Format: News/Talk
- Affiliations: ABC Radio News; World Wide News Network; Premiere Networks; Westwood One; Salem Radio Network; Talk Media Network; Compass Media Networks; Learfield Sports

Ownership
- Owner: HBG-Spokane II, LLC; (HBG-Spokane II, LLC)
- Operator: HBG-Spokane II, LLC
- Sister stations: KBNW-FM

History
- First air date: May 22, 1923 (as KFIO)
- Former call signs: KFIO (1923–1950); KSPO (1950–1957); KLYK (1957–1964); KSPO (1964–1983); KKER (1983–1984); KRSS (1985–1991)

Technical information
- Licensing authority: FCC
- Facility ID: 64668
- Class: C
- Power: 1,000 watts unlimited
- Transmitter coordinates: 47°39′29.60″N 117°25′11.80″W

Links
- Public license information: Public file; LMS
- Webcast: Listen Live
- Website: myinlandnorthwest.com

KSBN (1230 kHz, "News Radio KBNW") is a news/talk AM radio station licensed to serve the Spokane, Washington metropolitan area. The station was acquired by HBG-Spokane II, LLC from KSBN Radio, Inc. on June 1, 2026. KSBN-AM's studio is located at the Northtown Office Building in Spokane, and currently broadcasts at 1230 kHz with a power of 1,000 watts day and night from a rooftop antenna in downtown Spokane.

== History ==
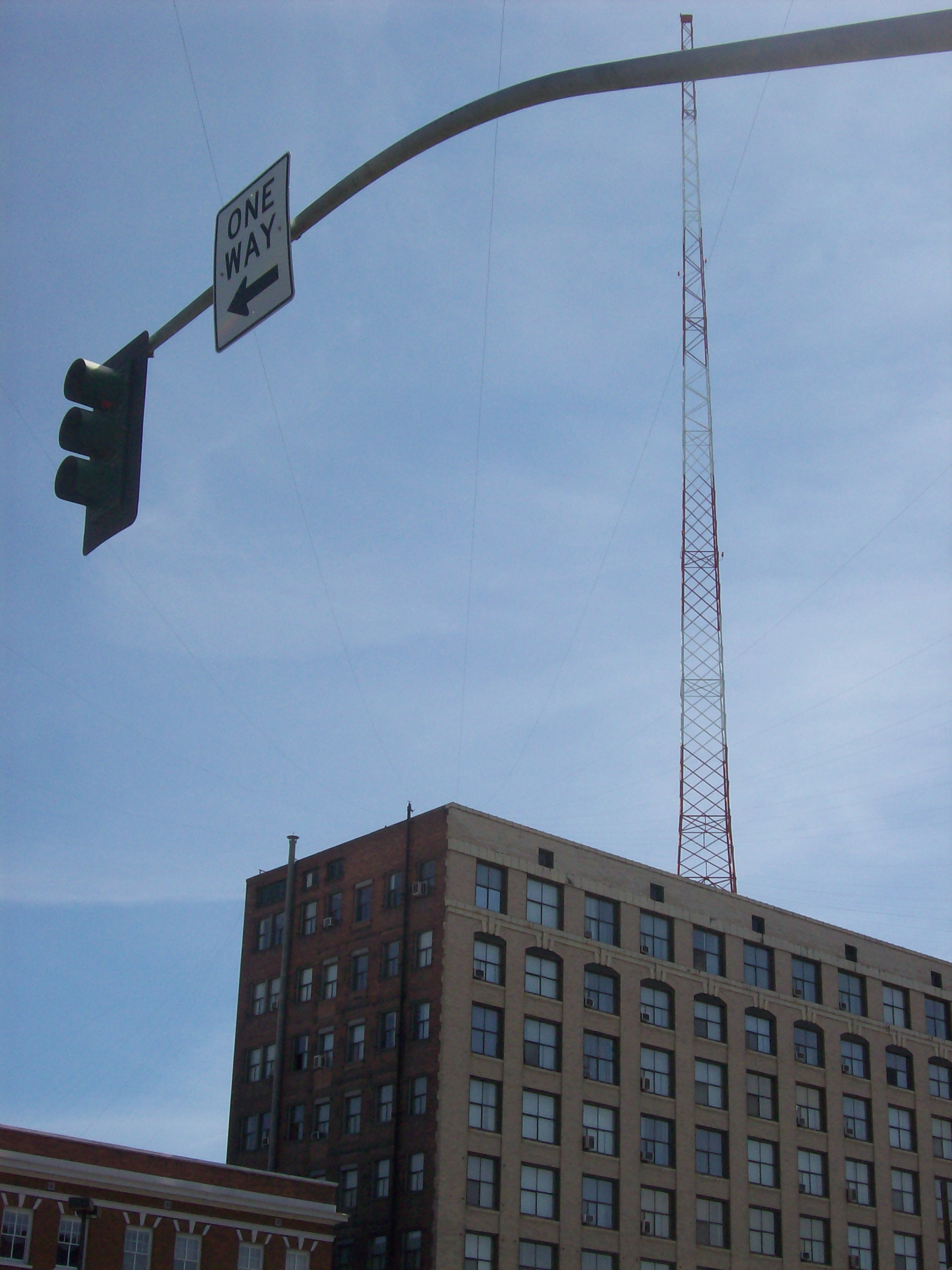
KSBN transmitter tower atop the Delaney Building (2009)

KSBN was first licensed in 1923 as KFIO, to North Central High School in Spokane. However, by this time, the school had been operating a radio transmitter for two years. In the summer of 1921 physics teacher Arthur L. Smith had seen the need to train young students in radio, an infant technology that would soon be widely used commercially. He obtained a "Technical and Training School" station license, with the call sign "7YL", that was issued in the name of North Central High School. With this license students could learn telegraphy and radio theory, and then apply what they learned in real life.

=== High school operations ===
Effective December 1, 1921, the Department of Commerce, which regulated radio at this time, adopted regulations formally establishing standards for stations making broadcasts intended for the general public. On May 22, 1923, the high school was issued a broadcast station license, with the alphabetically assigned call letters of KFIO. This was one of the earliest non-commercial educational stations, and one of the few operated by a high school instead of a college. It was the fourth radio station in Spokane, but the oldest continuously licensed and still operating.

KFIO was operated by student members of high school's Radio Club. The station broadcast features such as school news, entertainment that included concerts by the school band and orchestra (live from the auditorium) and sports events, in particular games between North Central High and Lewis and Clark High in 1924 and 1925. In addition to Friday evening programs, the station also broadcast during school time Monday to Friday and occasionally on Sunday evenings. Despite some difficulty in and controversy over keeping the station on the air, many of the people who became radio broadcast professionals in Spokane and nearby communities in the early radio days got their start in radio at KFIO.

D. Windsor Hunt, who worked at the station as a student beginning in 1927, related his experiences at the station and talked about what kind of programming the station broadcast. He noted that, among other things, he was responsible for reading the news, playing records, announcing school athletic events, and proms. The station had a library of records, all 78 RPM, mostly from the 1910s, but they also were able to get a hold of more recent hits of the time. Hunt noted that they obtained a copy of the record "Sweet Hearts on Parade" when it was still number one on the hit parade. Hunt also related they would read the news verbatim from the Spokesman-Review and the Spokane Chronicle, but they gave no credit to the original sources. They had to be careful to avoid mentioning divorce, sex, or bootlegging as those topics were considered taboo.

Hunt's account noted that the station's studio was originally located in crowded quarters on an upper floor in the south end of the high school building. He also stated that: "... The [transmitter] was in a closet about 8' X 16', between the physics lab and classroom, on the south side of the 3rd floor. ... The transmitter took up about six square feet and a two-foot passage alongside led to the studio. This was the back of the room with one window to an airwell. It was about 8' X 12'. ... On the right side was the 'console' - a bench about two feet wide with one turntable mounted on it. Later we got a variable speed job, but we didn't have LP (long play, not liquid petroleum) records so we never used it in my time. ... Someone loaned Mr. A. L. Smith a mechanical song bird from Europe - a wind up dealy in a big brass cage. Every 15 minutes it sang a line in a very beautiful realistic bird song. On the hour it sang a longer trill. It not only warned us of the time but often added a nice touch to the announcements."

=== Commercial station ===
KFIO was financed by the local school board, which eventually reduced its support to a level that no longer permitted the station to remain operating. Thus, on August 23, 1929, the station was sold to the Spokane Broadcasting Corporation and converted to a commercial operation.

In 1950, with the sale of the station to Louis Wasmer, the call letters were changed to KSPO. This was followed by a series of ownership and call letter changes. Marlin R. Taylor former President of Bonneville Broadcast Consultants owned the station for several years in the mid 1980's. TCC Broadcasting established an "all business" format in 1990, after the station went off the air for a short time. On April 29, 1991, it became KSBN. Owner/Manager Tom Cock sold the station in 1995 to KSBN Radio, Inc. HBG-Spokane II, LLC (Keith Shipman, Roger Nelson and Greg Obata, partners) acquired KSBN-AM on June 1, 2026.

Former logo

On May 8, 2026, KSBN rebranded as "News Radio KBNW", simulcasting KBNW-FM 107.1 Deer Park. 107.1 FM | 1230 AM News Radio KBNW provides 29 hours of local news programming each week, featuring Spokane's Morning News, Spokane's Afternoon News, local news updates at the top and bottom of each hour and MyInlandNorthwest This Week (weekly public affairs program). The station is affiliated with ABC Radio News (top of hour) and World Wide News Network (bottom of hour). Syndicated programs include Armstrong and Getty, The Lars Larson Show (Northwest version) and The Ramsey Show. News Radio KBNW also airs University of Idaho football, men's basketball and weekly coaches shows.
