= Grays, Washington =

Unincorporated community in Washington, United States

- Unincorporated community
- Location within Washington (state)
- Coordinates: 48°06′22″N 117°45′06″W
- Country: United States
- State: Washington
- County: Stevens
- Elevation: 1,870 ft (570 m)
- Time zone: UTC-8 (Pacific (PST))
  - Summer (DST): UTC-7 (PDT)
- ZIP code: 99181
- Area code: 509
- GNIS feature ID: 1531840

Grays (also called Gray and Grays Siding) is an unincorporated community in Stevens County, in the U.S. state of Washington.

== History ==
A post office called Gray was established in 1901, and remained in operation until 1935. The community was named after William Gray, a local land owner.
