= Dreamin' Wild =

2022 film by Bill Pohlad

- Theatrical release poster
- Directed by: Bill Pohlad
- Written by: Bill Pohlad
- Based on: "Fruitland" by Steven Kurutz
- Produced by: Jim Burke; Bill Pohlad; Kim Roth; Viviana Vezzani; Karl Spoerri
- Starring: Casey Affleck; Noah Jupe; Zooey Deschanel; Walton Goggins; Jack Dylan Grazer; Beau Bridges; Chris Messina
- Cinematography: Arnaud Potier
- Edited by: Annette Davey
- Music by: Donnie Emerson
- Production companies: River Road Entertainment; Zurich Avenue; Innisfree Pictures
- Distributed by: Roadside Attractions
- Release dates: September 7, 2022 (Venice); August 4, 2023
- Running time: 110 minutes
- Country: United States
- Language: English
- Box office: $303,164

Dreamin' Wild is a 2022 American biographical drama film written, directed, and produced by Bill Pohlad, and starring Casey Affleck, Noah Jupe, Zooey Deschanel, Walton Goggins, Jack Dylan Grazer, and Beau Bridges. Its storyline is based on the life of singer-musician brothers Donnie and Joe Emerson.

The film had its world premiere at the 79th Venice International Film Festival on September 7, 2022. It was released on August 4, 2023, by Roadside Attractions.

== Plot ==
30 years after it was recorded, the 1978 debut album of brothers Donnie and Joe Emerson is rediscovered long after they have given up on their rock 'n' roll dreams.

== Cast ==
- Casey Affleck as Donnie Emerson
  - Noah Jupe as young Donnie
- Zooey Deschanel as Nancy
- Walton Goggins as Joe Emerson
  - Jack Dylan Grazer as young Joe
- Beau Bridges as Don Emerson Sr.
- Chris Messina as Matt Sullivan

== Production ==
In April 2019, it was announced Bill Pohlad would direct, write, and produce a biographical film about Donnie and Joe Emerson, with Focus Features set to distribute. In October 2021, Casey Affleck, Noah Jupe, Zooey Deschanel, Chris Messina, Jack Dylan Grazer and Walton Goggins joined the cast of the film.

Principal photography began in October 2021, in Spokane, Washington.

== Release ==
The film had its world premiere at the 79th Venice International Film Festival on September 7, 2022. In March 2023, Roadside Attractions acquired distribution rights to the film, and scheduled a release date on August 4, 2023.

== Critical response ==
On the review aggregator website Rotten Tomatoes, 90% of 60 critics' reviews are positive, with an average rating of 7.3/10. The website's consensus reads: "The thoughtful and well-acted Dreamin' Wild honors the creative impulse and the faith it takes to will a dream into reality." Metacritic, which uses a weighted average, assigned the film a score of 66 out of 100, based on 14 critics, indicating "generally favorable" reviews.
