= Mount Kit Carson =

Mountain in Washington (state), United States

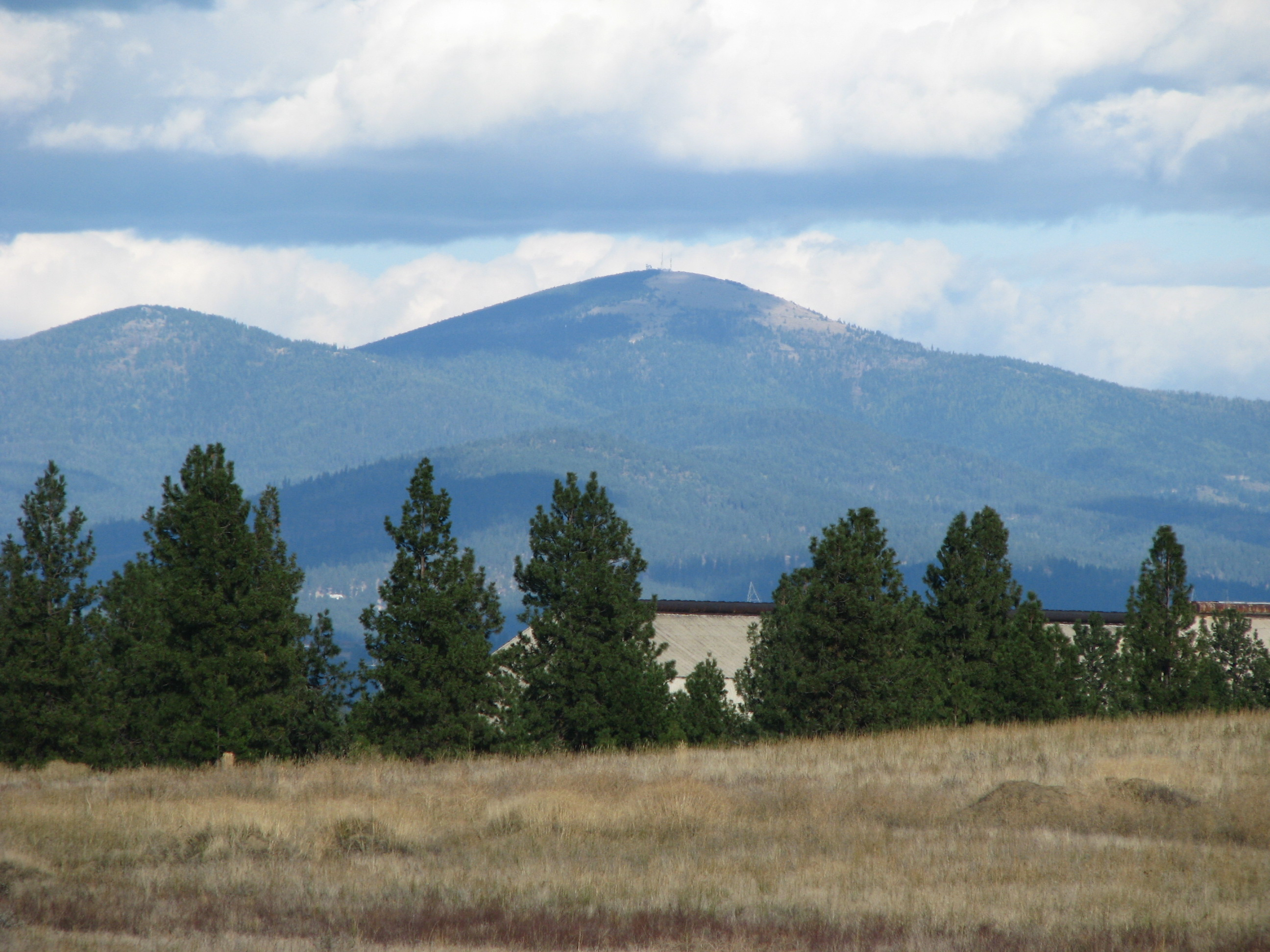
- Mount Kit Carson (left) and Mount Spokane (center), as seen from northeast Spokane

Highest point
- Elevation: 5,286 ft (1,611 m) NAVD 88
- Prominence: 322 ft (98 m)
- Parent peak: Mount Spokane
- Coordinates: 47°55′02″N 117°08′30″W

Geography
- Location within the United States Location within Washington (state)
- Location: Spokane County, Washington, U.S.
- Parent range: Selkirk Range
- Topo map: USGS Mount Kit Carson

Climbing
- Easiest route: Trail hike

Mount Kit Carson is a mountain in the northwest United States, located in Spokane County, Washington, northeast of Spokane, with a summit elevation of 5,286 feet (1,611 m) above sea level. It is in Mount Spokane State Park, the largest of Washington's State Parks at 13,919 acres (21.7 mi^{2}; 56.3 km^{2}).

== 1962 Plane crash ==
On September 10, 1962, a U.S. Air Force KC-135 Stratotanker was descending for a landing at Fairchild Air Force Base west of Spokane when it flew into a fog-shrouded ravine on Mount Kit Carson. The aircraft was based at Ellsworth AFB in South Dakota and all forty-four aboard were killed. It was the worst aviation accident in U.S. history (at the time) and as of October 2012, remains the 3rd worst accident (currently) involving a KC-135. It was attributed to a navigational error by the crew.
