= Green Bluff, Washington =

- Unincorporated community Census designated place
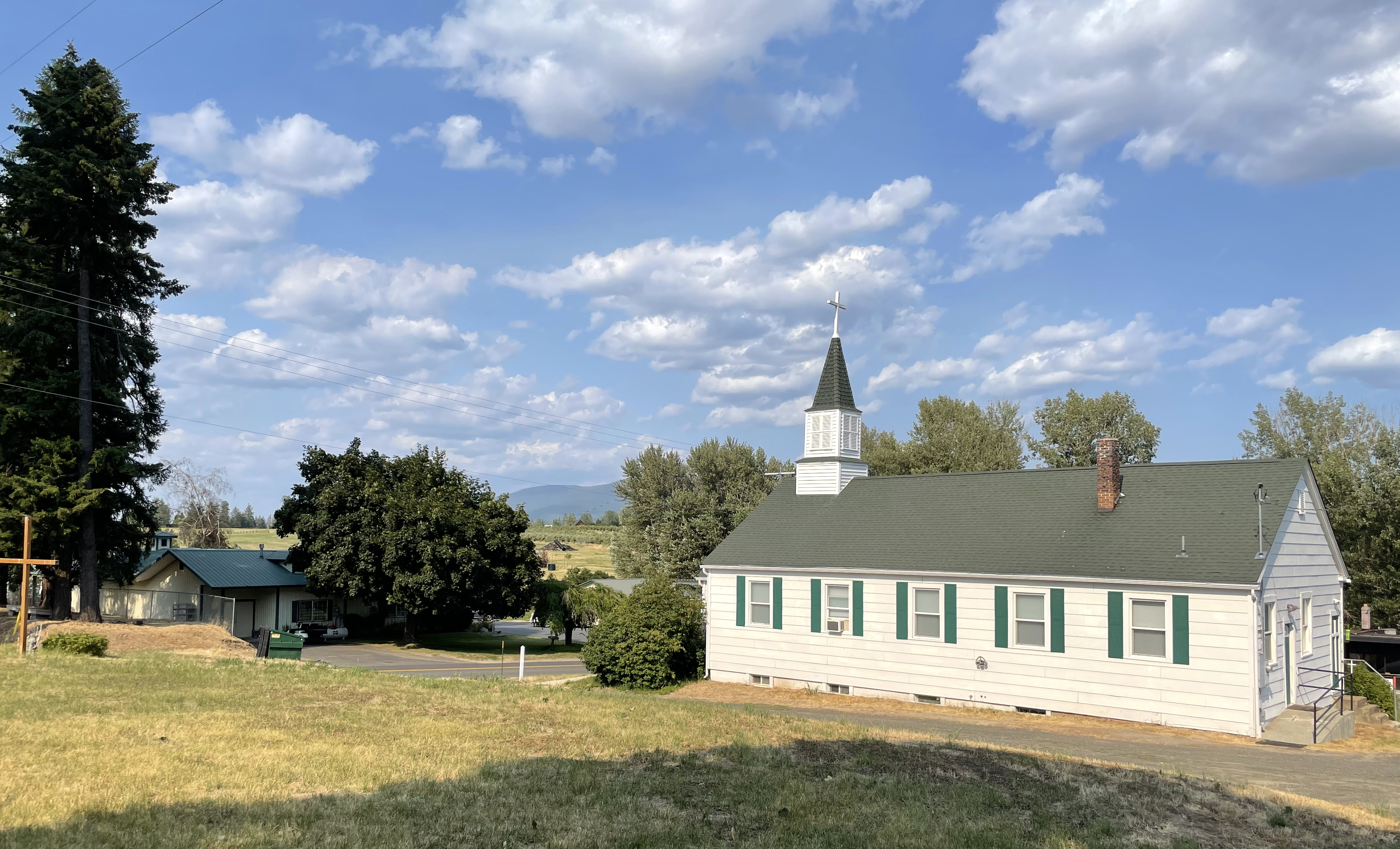
- Green Bluff Community Church and Beck's Harvest House

- Location within Washington (state)
- Coordinates: 47°49′18″N 117°15′35″W
- Country: United States
- State: Washington
- County: Spokane
- Elevation: 2,313 ft (705 m)
- Time zone: UTC-8 (Pacific (PST))
  - Summer (DST): UTC-7 (PDT)
- ZIP code: 99005, 99021
- Area code: 509
- GNIS feature ID: 2584978

Green Bluff is an unincorporated farming community and census-designated place in Spokane County, Washington. It is named after a nearby cliff. Its elevation is 2,310 feet (700 m).

As of the 2020 census, Green Bluff had a population of 697. The 2010 census was the first time the community has been recognized by the U.S. Census Bureau.

The town has a grange hall, church, fire station and general store and is known for equestrian properties as well as small farms. Located just 15 minutes drive north of Spokane, Green Bluff is a popular destination among locals for fruit picking. It hosts various festivals throughout the year, highlighted by the annual fall festival during the apple and pumpkin harvests.

== History ==
Long ago Native Americans burned away the underbrush on the bluff to give them better vision while they hunted game. A repercussion of this act was the growth of thick green grass around the evergreen trees, giving the area a park-like appearance. The bluff was given the name "Green Bluff" by early pioneers.

Peone Prairie, a valley to the south of the bluff was a gathering place for Native American tribes who frequented Green Bluff. Baptiste Peone was chief of the valley camp, and his wife and children were baptized by Ref. J.M. Cataldo in 1864. Cataldo became missionary for the Spokane people in 1867, and soon baptized every member of the camp.

As many as 500 Native Americans gathered in the valley for horse races. Green Bluff was favored as a lookout spot and hunting ground for the natives of the area. Most of the trappers and hunters eventually moved on, and a lumber industry with several saw mills arose in the area. Some pioneers took logs to Newman Lake, and traded them for lumber. Many homes were built from the area's wood.

Some families from Germany moved into the area around 1889. There were still many pine and fir tree roots on the bluff, so much of the early work by these settlers was removal of the roots, which took a great deal of work and time. As time passed, the area was opened up to farming. There were few trails and no roads on the bluff, so transportation was difficult. Because of the vast amount of roots that needed to be cleared, the early settlers had to find a crop that would grow between tree stumps. Strawberries were the early choice, and were picked for years.

Since Green Bluff was a day's ride by wagon northeast of Spokane, in 1909 the area was officially called the "Green Bluff Township #20." Officers who carried out governing duties such as a clerk, assessor and treasurer were elected by the community and held monthly and annual meetings until 1972, when the township was disbanded by demand of the county. It was one of the last townships in the area.

The Green Bluff Grange is described as "an agricultural fraternity and its purpose is to build a program of fellowship, service and member activities." Green Bluff Grange #300 was first organized in 1909, and meetings were held twice a month, on the second and fourth Saturdays of the month. In March 1909, the idea of building a community hall was proposed, and the hall was soon built by many local people who purchased shares. Meetings were held in the hall except when the $5 a month rent could not be paid. On those months, meetings were held in the schoolhouse. Then in 1916 the Hall burned down. There were long periods of inactivity at this point, until 1929 when the idea of building a new Grange Hall was proposed. It wasn't until 1934 that an old boarding house in Elk, Washington was torn down and the wood was used to build the new Grange Hall. It was completed in May 1935.

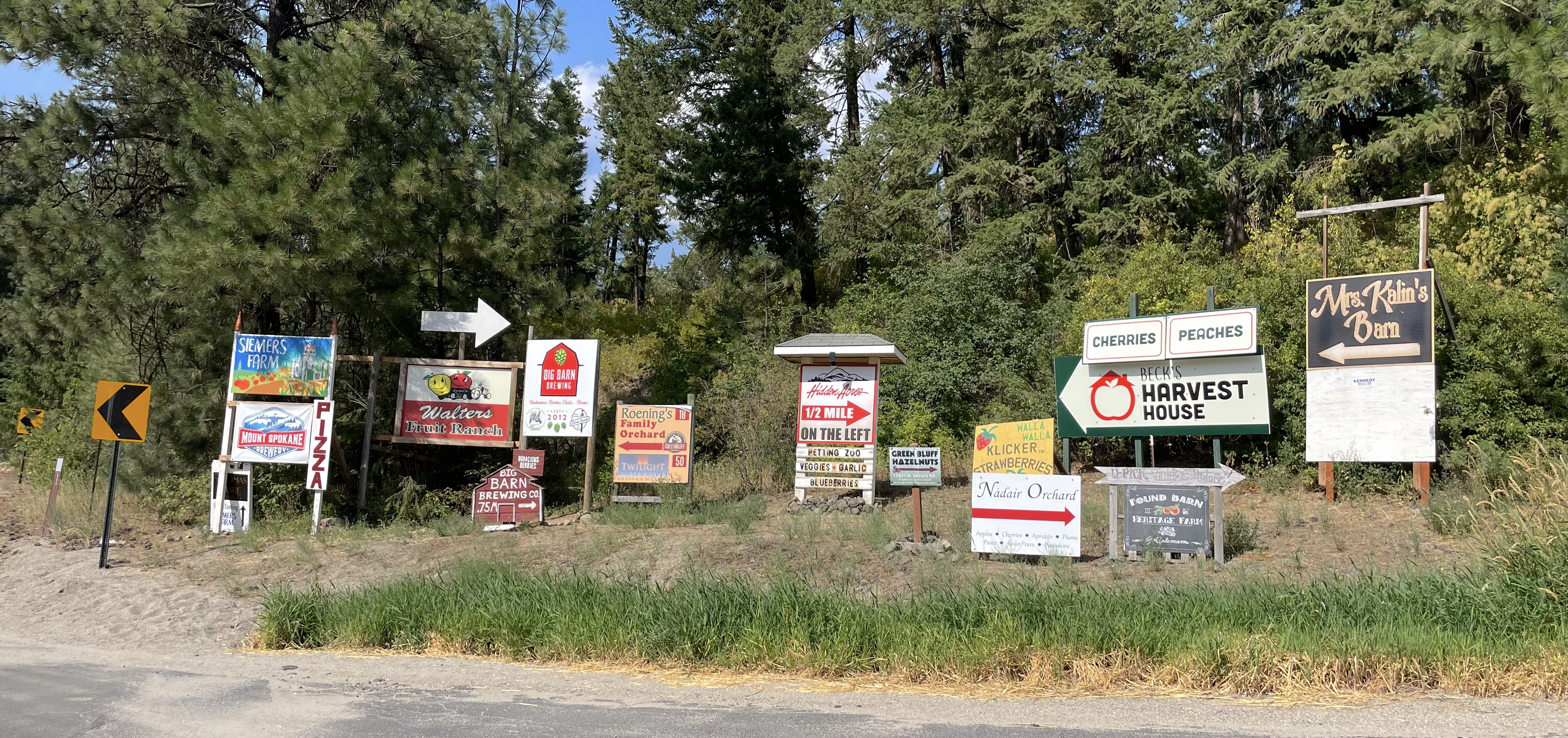
Signs advertising farms on the road up to Green Bluff

There are many farms on Green Bluff which can be found at GreenbluffGrowers.com. Green Bluff is known for dry land farming and is home to breweries, a winery, cidery, meadery, and catering company, as well as an abundance of fresh produce including strawberries, rhubarb, lavender, cherries, raspberries, apricots, peaches, pears, blackberries, apples, nectarines, potatoes, carrots, cabbages, christmas trees and more.

== Geography ==
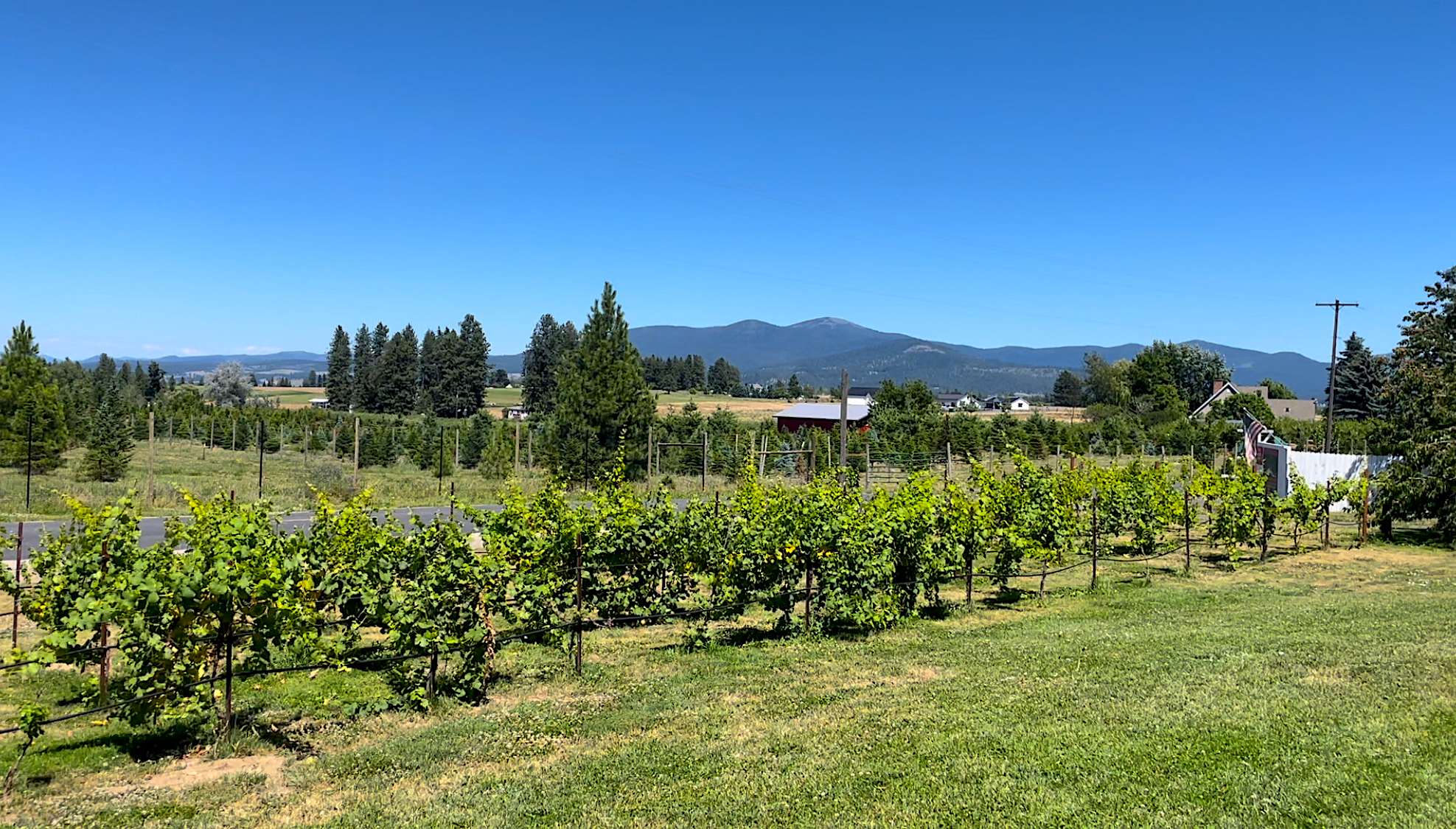
View of Mount Spokane from Green Bluff

Green Bluff is located in northeastern Spokane County on a bluff of the same name which rises to a plateau 500 feet above the Peone Prairie immediately to the south and the Valley Prairie immediately to the north. An intermittent stream cuts a thin, steep valley through the center of the Green Bluff area, which Day Mount Spokane Road follows into the community. The terrain where the farming takes place in Green Bluff is a relatively flat plateau compared to the bluffs which surround it. To the east of Green Bluff rise the foothills of Mount Spokane.

The community of Colbert is located approximately two miles west and the community of Mead is approximately three miles to the southwest. These two areas are on the suburban edge of the Spokane urban area. The nearest highways are Washington State Route 206 two miles south of Green Bluff and U.S. 2 a mile and a half to the west.

== Demographics ==
Historical population
Census	Pop.	Note	%±
2010	761		—
2020	697		−8.4%
U.S. Decennial Census; 2000 2010

Green Bluff first appeared as a census designated place in the 2010 U.S. census.

=== Racial and ethnic composition ===
Green Bluff CDP, Washington – Racial and ethnic composition Note: the US Census treats Hispanic/Latino as an ethnic category. This table excludes Latinos from the racial categories and assigns them to a separate category. Hispanics/Latinos may be of any race.
Race / Ethnicity (NH = Non-Hispanic)	Pop 2010	Pop 2020	% 2010	% 2020
White alone (NH)	706	631	92.77%	90.53%
Black or African American alone (NH)	0	4	0.00%	0.57%
Native American or Alaska Native alone (NH)	6	2	0.79%	0.29%
Asian alone (NH)	5	7	0.66%	1.00%
Native Hawaiian or Pacific Islander alone (NH)	0	0	0.00%	0.00%
Other race alone (NH)	2	1	0.26%	0.14%
Mixed race or Multiracial (NH)	11	33	1.45%	4.73%
Hispanic or Latino (any race)	31	19	4.07%	2.73%
Total	761	697	100.00%	100.00%

== Local buildings ==
In addition to the farm and residential buildings, the Green Bluff community is home to a handful of other buildings.

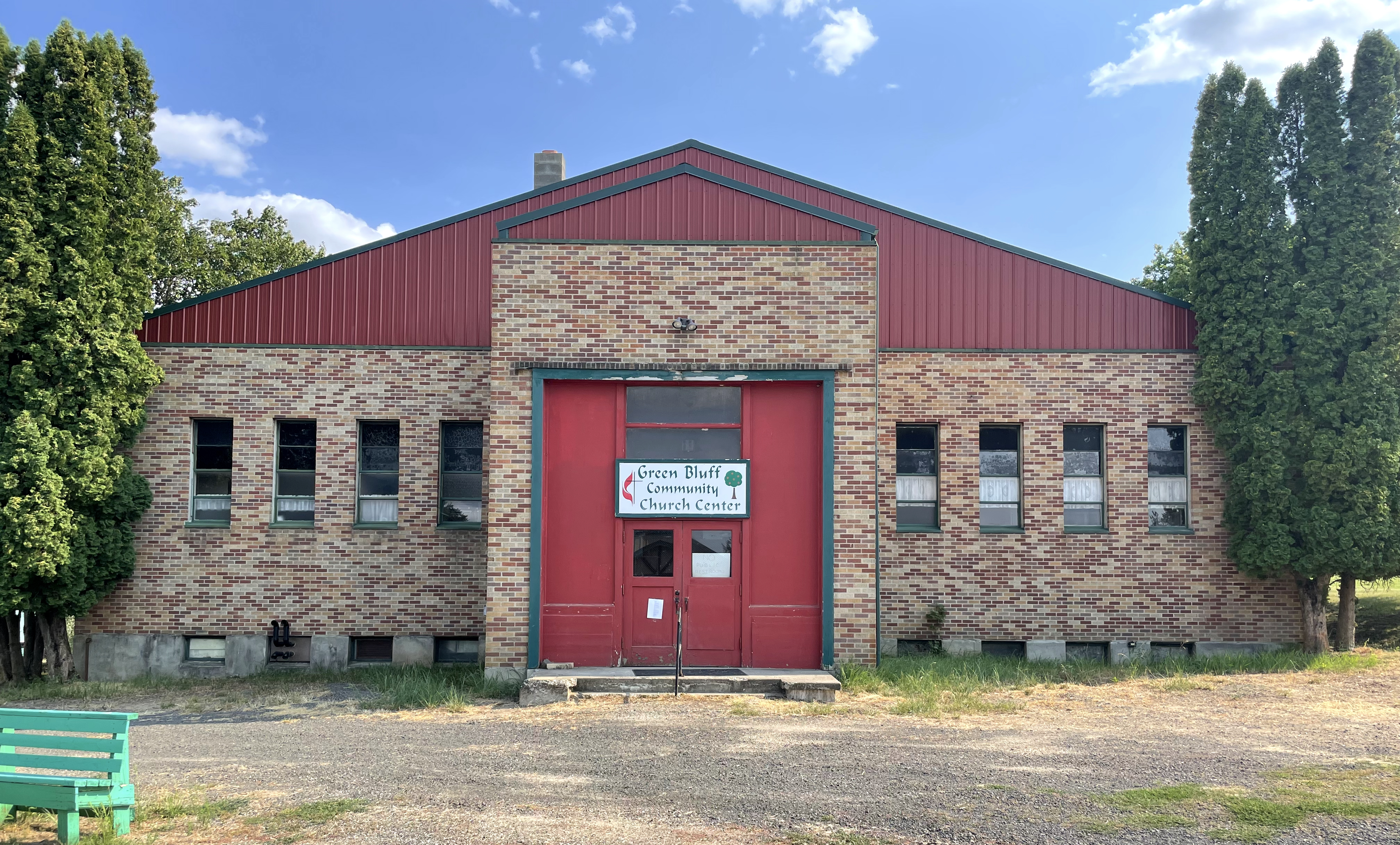
Green Bluff School

School

Green Bluff School District #101 was formed on February 18, 1891. Land was purchased in 1891 for purpose of building a school. Another acre of land was given to the school some years later. In 1913, more property was purchased, giving the school ground a total of 3.2 acres (13,000 m^{2}). In the early years, the school was surrounded by apple trees that had to be dug out by hand. The first school was a one-room log building. By 1901, a new, one-room framed school was built. In June 1906, a second room was added; in 1910, a third room was added. In 1945, the frame schoolhouse was dismantled and a new "chicken-house" was built.

In 1952 it was faced with brick, and in 1969 a third classroom was added. In 1970 its doors were closed, until 1972 when it became the Green Bluff Learning Center, which was an alternative school for boys with special learning needs. That lasted until 1976. Then in 1977, because of crowded conditions, all first-graders from Colbert Elementary School were transferred to Green Bluff's school, which continued until 1980, the last year that students were taught at the school. It was later purchase by the local church, serving as a community center and pre-school.

Church

The first Green Bluff United Methodist Church was built in 1909. It was created by the community, since until that time, only a visiting minister provided Sunday school, just once a month. The community agreed to pay him a $200 salary to come every Sunday and provide services in the schoolhouse until a church could be built. Many pastors served the church in its early years, coming from the Peone or the Mead parsonage. On March 16, 1945, the church was completely destroyed by fire. The cause is assumed to be an overheated furnace. Church services took place in the grange until the new church's dedication on May 4, 1947.

General store

The Green Bluff General Store has existed for over a hundred years, surviving two locations, two fires and three different buildings. It no longer has the full-service use it once did, but the location on the corner of Green Bluff and Day-Mt. Spokane Rd. hasn't changed since 1910. It was originally located at the corner of Halliday and Day-Mt. Spokane Rd., and called "Abbott's Store." After a year or two the store closed due to a property dispute. In 1910 the first store in its present location was built. It burned around 1923 or ’24. Rev. Wellington operated the "Green Bluff Mercantile" for twenty years, sometimes marrying people in the store rather than the church. In 1955 the store burned down, and a replacement store wasn't built until 1958. It still stands to this day, although there have been many different owners.

Fire station

The original Green Bluff Fire Station was built in the early 1960s northeast of the Green Bluff store and church. It was a small red building housing a 5 to 7-thousand gallon water tank beneath it. Need for a fire station arose after the 1955 burning of the general store and a local barn. Fundraising for the fire station took place in 1960. The first fire chief was elected in November 1962, and in January 1963, Green Bluff got its first fire truck, a 1963 GMC converted gasoline delivery truck. A new station was built in the 1990s west of the school and church.

== Education ==
The community is served by the Mead School District.

== Events and festivals ==
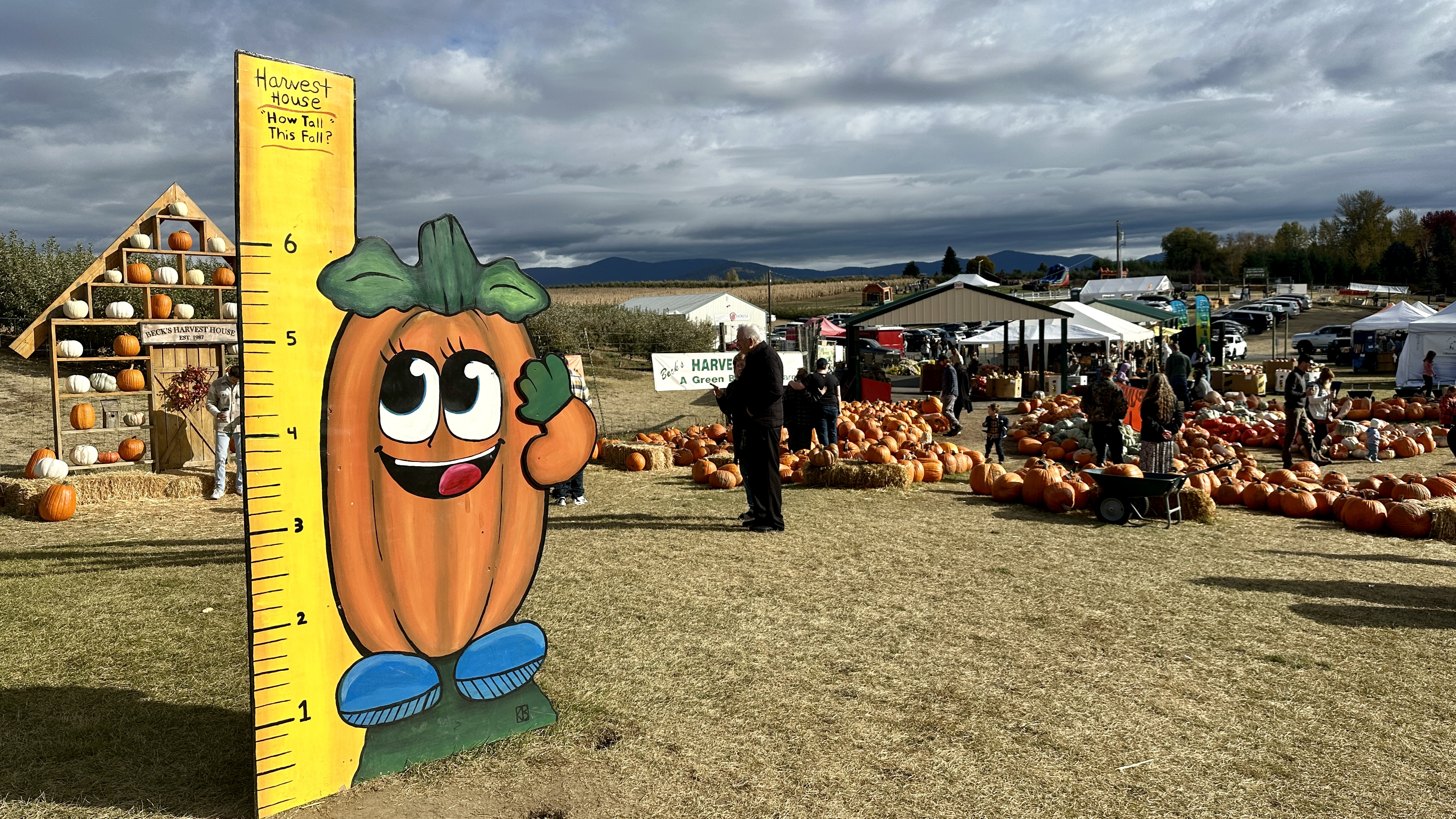
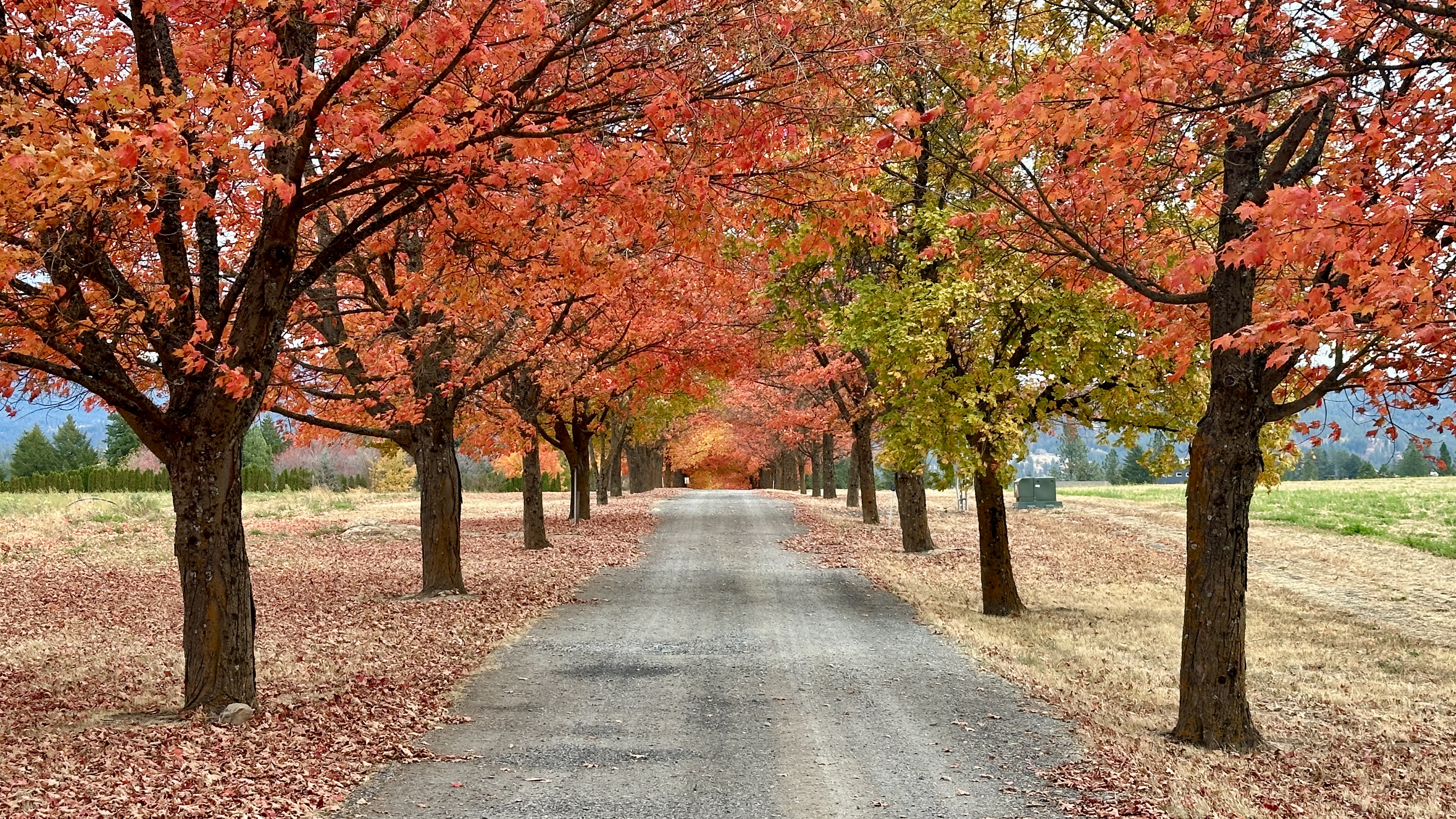
A Green Bluff pumpkin patch (left) and fall foliage (right) seen during the annual Harvest Festival

Green Bluff has become a popular place to visit for locally sourced foodstuffs. The Green Bluff community and participating growers host many festivals throughout the year that coincide with the harvesting time of various produce such as berries, cherries, peaches, apples, and pumpkins for those who enjoy the act of picking their own fruit. Arguably the most popular of these festivals is the Harvest Festival, which happens annually on the last two weekends of September and every weekend of October; attendees can go to participating growers and may experience apple and pumpkin picking, riding ponies and tractors, getting lost in corn and hay mazes, visiting food and craft vendors, and listening to live music. The fall festival is a popular activity for families and hosts school field trips and also attracts leaf peepers who want to witness or photograph the vibrant fall foliage that comes with the changing seasons. The area farms and barn houses are also popular wedding venues.

== Sources ==
- Hogue, Jadee; Kalhar, Anne Margaret; Turner (1984). Green Bluff's Heritage. Ye Galleon Press. ISBN 9780877703242.
