= Stevens County, Washington =

County in Washington, United States

- County
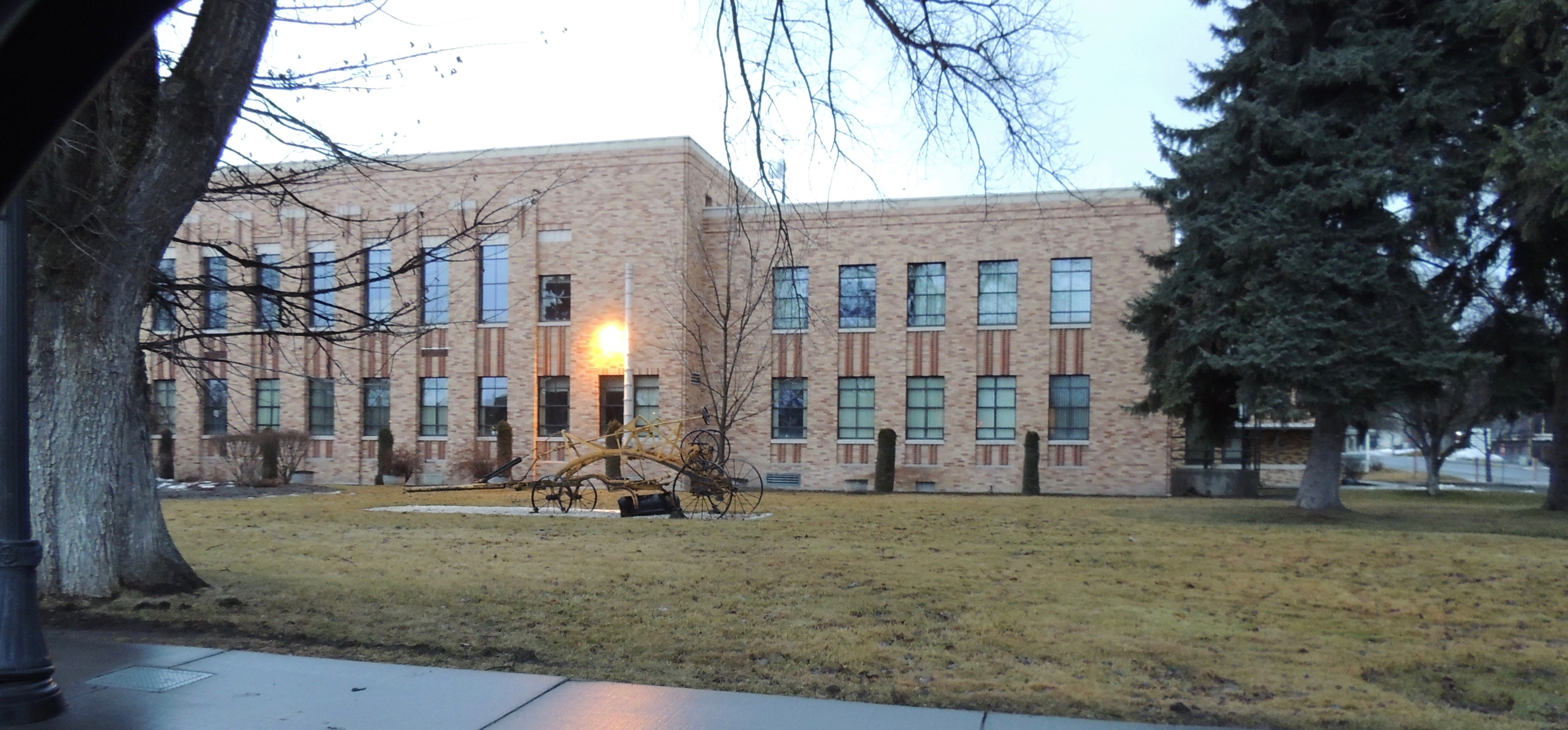
- Stevens County Courthouse in Colville

- Flag

- Location within the U.S. state of Washington
- Coordinates: 48°24′N 117°51′W
- Country: United States
- State: Washington
- Founded: January 20, 1863
- Named for: Isaac Stevens
- Seat: Colville
- Largest city: Colville

Area
  - Total: 2,541 sq mi (6,580 km^{2})
  - Land: 2,478 sq mi (6,420 km^{2})
  - Water: 63 sq mi (160 km^{2}) 2.5%

Population (2020)
  - Total: 46,445
  - Estimate (2025): 49,668 ▲
  - Density: 18/sq mi (6.9/km^{2})
- Time zone: UTC−8 (Pacific)
  - Summer (DST): UTC−7 (PDT)
- Congressional district: 5th
- Website: stevenscountywa.gov

Stevens County is a county located in the U.S. state of Washington along the Canada–US border. At the 2020 census, its population was 46,445. The county seat and largest city is Colville, and the largest CDP is Suncrest. The county was created in 1863 and named after Isaac Stevens, the first governor of Washington Territory.

Stevens County is included in the Spokane-Spokane Valley, WA Metropolitan Statistical Area. Most of the Spokane Indian Reservation is within the borders of the county.

== Geography ==
According to the United States Census Bureau, the county has a total area of 2,541 square miles (6,580 km^{2}), of which 2,478 square miles (6,420 km^{2}) is land and 63 square miles (160 km^{2}) (2.5%) is water.

=== Geographic features ===
- Columbia River

=== Adjacent counties ===
- Pend Oreille County – east
- Spokane County – southeast
- Lincoln County – southwest
- Ferry County – west
- Kootenay Boundary Regional District, British Columbia – north
- Regional District of Central Kootenay, British Columbia – northeast

=== National protected areas ===
- Pacific Northwest National Scenic Trail (part)
- Colville National Forest (part)
- Kaniksu National Forest (part)
- Lake Roosevelt National Recreation Area (part)
- Little Pend Oreille National Wildlife Refuge (part)

== Demographics ==
Historical population
| Census | Pop. | Note | %± |
|---|---|---|---|
| 1860 | 996 | | — |
| 1870 | 734 | | −26.3% |
| 1880 | 1,245 | | 69.6% |
| 1890 | 4,341 | | 248.7% |
| 1900 | 10,543 | | 142.9% |
| 1910 | 25,297 | | 139.9% |
| 1920 | 21,605 | | −14.6% |
| 1930 | 18,550 | | −14.1% |
| 1940 | 19,275 | | 3.9% |
| 1950 | 18,580 | | −3.6% |
| 1960 | 17,884 | | −3.7% |
| 1970 | 17,405 | | −2.7% |
| 1980 | 28,979 | | 66.5% |
| 1990 | 30,948 | | 6.8% |
| 2000 | 40,066 | | 29.5% |
| 2010 | 43,531 | | 8.6% |
| 2020 | 46,445 | | 6.7% |
| 2025 (est.) | 49,668 | ▲ | 6.9% |
U.S. Decennial Census; 1790–1960 1900–1990; 1990–2000 2010–2020

=== 2020 census ===
As of the 2020 census, the county had a population of 46,445. Of the residents, 21.2% were under the age of 18 and 24.5% were 65 years of age or older; the median age was 48.3 years. For every 100 females there were 100.7 males, and for every 100 females age 18 and over there were 99.8 males. 10.9% of residents lived in urban areas and 89.1% lived in rural areas.

Stevens County, Washington – Racial and ethnic composition Note: the US Census treats Hispanic/Latino as an ethnic category. This table excludes Latinos from the racial categories and assigns them to a separate category. Hispanics/Latinos may be of any race.
| Race / Ethnicity (NH = Non-Hispanic) | Pop 2000 | Pop 2010 | Pop 2020 | % 2000 | % 2010 | % 2020 |
|---|---|---|---|---|---|---|
| White alone (NH) | 35,718 | 38,261 | 38,722 | 89.15% | 87.89% | 83.37% |
| Black or African American alone (NH) | 107 | 145 | 141 | 0.27% | 0.33% | 0.30% |
| Native American or Alaska Native alone (NH) | 2,163 | 2,275 | 2,558 | 5.40% | 5.23% | 5.51% |
| Asian alone (NH) | 193 | 234 | 280 | 0.48% | 0.54% | 0.60% |
| Pacific Islander alone (NH) | 56 | 62 | 84 | 0.14% | 0.14% | 0.18% |
| Other race alone (NH) | 86 | 73 | 288 | 0.21% | 0.17% | 0.62% |
| Mixed race or Multiracial (NH) | 1,004 | 1,296 | 2,687 | 2.51% | 2.98% | 5.79% |
| Hispanic or Latino (any race) | 739 | 1,185 | 1,685 | 1.84% | 2.72% | 3.63% |
| Total | 40,066 | 43,531 | 46,445 | 100.00% | 100.00% | 100.00% |

The racial makeup of the county was 84.6% White, 0.3% Black or African American, 5.8% American Indian and Alaska Native, 0.6% Asian, 0.2% Native Hawaiian and Pacific Islander, 1.3% from some other race, and 7.1% from two or more races. Hispanic or Latino residents of any race comprised 3.6% of the population.

There were 18,805 households in the county, of which 25.2% had children under the age of 18 living with them and 21.5% had a female householder with no spouse or partner present. About 26.6% of all households were made up of individuals and 13.8% had someone living alone who was 65 years of age or older.

There were 22,242 housing units, of which 15.5% were vacant. Among occupied housing units, 79.0% were owner-occupied and 21.0% were renter-occupied. The homeowner vacancy rate was 1.2% and the rental vacancy rate was 4.0%.

=== 2010 census ===
As of the 2010 census, the population density was 17.6 people per square mile (6.8 people/km^{2}). There were 21,156 housing units at an average density of 8.5 units per square mile (3.3 units/km^{2}). The racial makeup of the county was 88.9% White, 0.6% Black or African American, 1.5% Native American, 1.5% Asian, 0.2% Pacific Islander, 3.5% from other races, 3.7% two or more races. Those of Hispanic or Latino origin made up 2.7% of the population. In terms of ancestry, 24.6% were German, 14.2% were Irish, 13.7% were English, 6.4% were Norwegian, and 6.1% were American.

Of the households, 29.6% had children under the age of 18 living with them, 56.3% were married couples living together, 9.0% had a female householder with no husband present, 29.9% were non-families, and 24.6% of households were made up of individuals. The average household size was 2.50 and the average family size was 2.95. The median age was 45.0 years.

The median household income was $42,845 and the median family income was $51,544. Males had a median income of $46,721 versus $33,651 for females. The per capita income for the county was $21,773. About 11.0% of families and 15.1% of the population were below the poverty line, including 21.1% of those under age 18 and 9.3% of those age 65 or over.

=== 2000 census ===
As of the 2000 census, there were 40,066 people, 15,017 households, and 11,022 families in the county. The population density was 16 people per square mile (6.2 people/km^{2}). There were 17,599 housing units at an average density of 7 units per square mile (2.7 units/km^{2}). The racial makeup of the county was 90.05% White, 0.28% Black or African American, 5.66% Native American, 0.48% Asian, 0.16% Pacific Islander, 0.68% from other races, and 2.70% from two or more races. 1.84%. were Hispanic or Latino of any race. 20.6% were of German, 18.9% United States or American, 10.0% English, 7.9% Irish and 5.0% Norwegian ancestry.

Of the 15,017 households 34.40% had children under the age of 18 living with them, 60.40% were married couples living together, 8.70% had a female householder with no husband present, and 26.60% were non-families. 22.00% of households were one person and 8.80% were one person aged 65 or older. The average household size was 2.64 and the average family size was 3.08.

The age distribution was 28.70% under the age of 18, 6.40% from 18 to 24, 24.90% from 25 to 44, 27.10% from 45 to 64, and 12.90% 65 or older. The median age was 39 years. For every 100 females there were 99.10 males. For every 100 females age 18 and over, there were 96.60 males.

The median household income was $34,673 and the median family income was $40,250. Males had a median income of $35,256 versus $23,679 for females. The per capita income for the county was $15,895. About 11.50% of families and 15.90% of the population were below the poverty line, including 19.80% of those under age 18 and 11.90% of those age 65 or over.

== Communities ==
=== Cities ===
- Chewelah
- Colville (county seat)
- Kettle Falls

=== Towns ===
- Marcus
- Northport
- Springdale

=== Census-designated places ===
- Addy
- Clayton
- Loon Lake
- Suncrest
- Valley

=== Unincorporated communities ===
- Arden
- Arzina
- Cedonia
- Evans
- Ford
- Fruitland
- Gifford
- Grays
- Hunters
- Nine Mile Falls
- Rice
- Tumtum (also known as Tum Tum)
- Wellpinit

== Politics ==
Like many counties in Eastern Washington, Stevens County is solidly Republican and has voted for every Republican presidential nominee since Richard Nixon in 1968. In 2024, the county was one of only four in Washington State, along with neighboring Lincoln County, to give all ten statewide Republican candidates over 70% of the vote.

United States presidential election results for Stevens County, Washington
| Year | Republican | | Democratic | | Third party(ies) | |
| Year | No. | % | No. | % | No. | % |
|---|---|---|---|---|---|---|
| 1892 | 622 | 37.31% | 501 | 30.05% | 544 | 32.63% |
| 1896 | 433 | 18.08% | 1,926 | 80.42% | 36 | 1.50% |
| 1900 | 1,121 | 39.95% | 1,612 | 57.45% | 73 | 2.60% |
| 1904 | 2,369 | 63.31% | 872 | 23.30% | 501 | 13.39% |
| 1908 | 2,546 | 52.13% | 1,564 | 32.02% | 774 | 15.85% |
| 1912 | 810 | 13.50% | 1,979 | 32.98% | 3,212 | 53.52% |
| 1916 | 2,684 | 40.32% | 3,184 | 47.84% | 788 | 11.84% |
| 1920 | 3,282 | 55.68% | 1,452 | 24.64% | 1,160 | 19.68% |
| 1924 | 2,909 | 48.94% | 685 | 11.52% | 2,350 | 39.54% |
| 1928 | 3,813 | 63.05% | 2,147 | 35.50% | 88 | 1.46% |
| 1932 | 2,247 | 32.13% | 4,262 | 60.94% | 485 | 6.93% |
| 1936 | 1,981 | 28.57% | 4,536 | 65.41% | 418 | 6.03% |
| 1940 | 3,238 | 39.45% | 4,904 | 59.75% | 66 | 0.80% |
| 1944 | 3,151 | 43.98% | 3,951 | 55.14% | 63 | 0.88% |
| 1948 | 2,977 | 40.05% | 4,205 | 56.56% | 252 | 3.39% |
| 1952 | 4,458 | 56.54% | 3,355 | 42.55% | 72 | 0.91% |
| 1956 | 4,499 | 54.06% | 3,808 | 45.76% | 15 | 0.18% |
| 1960 | 4,076 | 51.24% | 3,861 | 48.54% | 18 | 0.23% |
| 1964 | 3,302 | 43.57% | 4,266 | 56.29% | 10 | 0.13% |
| 1968 | 3,435 | 46.77% | 2,948 | 40.14% | 962 | 13.10% |
| 1972 | 4,839 | 61.26% | 2,390 | 30.26% | 670 | 8.48% |
| 1976 | 4,719 | 51.81% | 3,824 | 41.98% | 566 | 6.21% |
| 1980 | 7,094 | 61.53% | 3,584 | 31.08% | 852 | 7.39% |
| 1984 | 8,211 | 64.29% | 4,304 | 33.70% | 256 | 2.00% |
| 1988 | 6,576 | 54.97% | 5,068 | 42.37% | 318 | 2.66% |
| 1992 | 5,706 | 38.59% | 4,960 | 33.54% | 4,121 | 27.87% |
| 1996 | 7,524 | 46.96% | 5,591 | 34.90% | 2,907 | 18.14% |
| 2000 | 11,299 | 62.78% | 5,560 | 30.89% | 1,140 | 6.33% |
| 2004 | 13,015 | 63.99% | 6,822 | 33.54% | 503 | 2.47% |
| 2008 | 13,132 | 58.78% | 8,499 | 38.04% | 710 | 3.18% |
| 2012 | 13,691 | 61.78% | 7,762 | 35.03% | 708 | 3.19% |
| 2016 | 15,161 | 64.80% | 5,767 | 24.65% | 2,467 | 10.54% |
| 2020 | 19,808 | 69.67% | 7,839 | 27.57% | 783 | 2.75% |
| 2024 | 19,895 | 70.43% | 7,492 | 26.52% | 859 | 3.04% |

== See also ==
- National Register of Historic Places listings in Stevens County, Washington
