= Mount Spokane Ski and Snowboard Park =

Ski area in Washington, United States

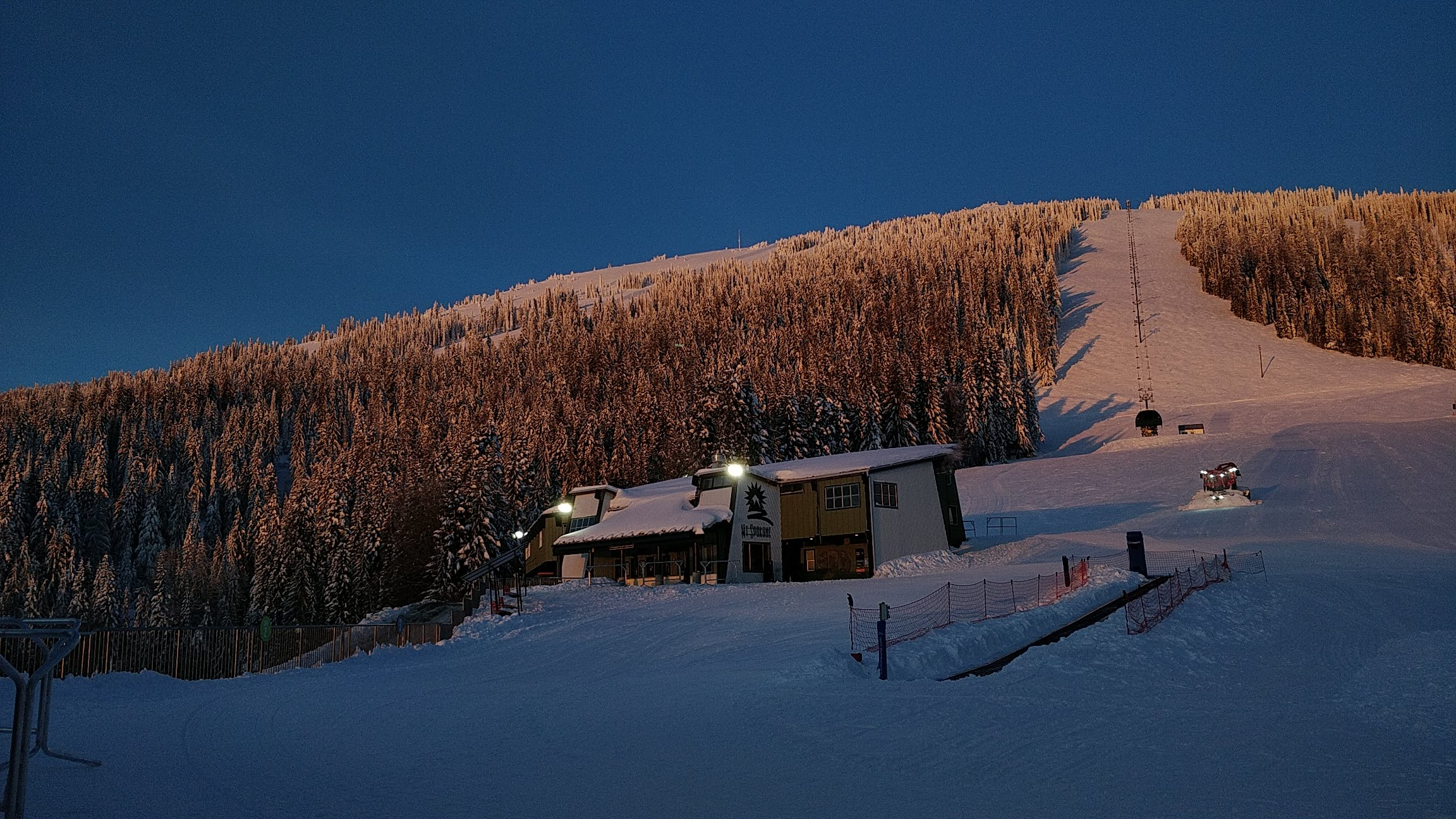
- Early sunrise at Lodge 2 in January 2022

- Location in the United States Location in Washington
- Location: Mount Spokane State Park, Spokane County, Washington, U.S.
- Nearest city: Spokane: 23 miles (37 km)
- Coordinates: 47.922°N 117.097°W
- Vertical: 2,071 ft (631 m)
- Top elevation: 5,889 ft (1,795 m)
- Base elevation: 4,400 ft (1,340 m) lodge 2 base area 3,818 ft (1,164 m) lowest lift base, #4
- Skiable area: 1,704 acres (6.9 km^{2})
- Trails: 52 (16 night runs): 23% easiest; 62% more difficult; 15% most difficult
- Lift system: 6 Chairlifts, 2 Surface lifts
- Lift capacity: 8,000 per hr
- Terrain parks: 3
- Snowfall: 250 in (640 cm)
- Snowmaking: no
- Night skiing: yes
- Website: https://www.mtspokane.com

Mount Spokane Ski and Snowboard Park is a ski resort in the western United States, located inside Mount Spokane State Park in Spokane County, Washington, about 23 miles (37 km) northeast of Spokane via State Route 206. The base elevation is at 3,818 feet (1,164 m) with the peak at 5,889 feet (1,795 m), yielding a vertical drop of 2,071 feet (631 m). Its slopes are primarily east-facing, and are served by six chairlifts.

== History ==
Additional land at Mount Spokane was obtained due to the efforts of Cheney Cowles (1908–1943), whose father ran the Cowles Publishing Company. Cowles was the managing editor of the Spokane Daily Chronicle and was an original member of the Spokane Ski Club; he was killed in military plane crash in Alabama during World War II.

The Vista House at the summit was constructed in 1933, and built by local Washington contractor E.O. Fieldstad – the first of five fire lookouts on the mountain, some of which were constructed by the Civilian Conservation Corps (CCC). Mount Spokane hosted the Northwest ski championships in February 1937. Future Olympic gold medalist Gretchen Fraser (née Kunigk), then 18, won the women's slalom.

The ski area was originally on the west side of the mountain with rope tows and operated the world's first double chairlift in 1947, converted from a mine tramway from Wallace, Idaho, with a lodge built by the CCC the late 1930s. A one-fatality fire in the nearly-completed lodge addition in January 1952 began the move to the east slopes. A new day lodge (#1) was built by the state on the east side and a Riblet double chair was installed in the summer of 1956. A second was added five years later, and a third in 1970. The fourth chair was added a few years later, the fifth in 1977 and the sixth in 2018. Night skiing on Mount Spokane began 59 years ago in December 1967.

The majority owner of the Mount Spokane Chairlift, Inc. was founder Al E. Mettler (1902–1985), who sold his interest in 1970 to Rock E. Caley. Six years later, Caley filed for Chapter 11 bankruptcy and the ski area assets were sold to a creditor, Riblet Tramway Company of Spokane. Mettler returned in March 1976, as interim general manager for a few months, relieved by Keith Petrie, previously at Anthony Lakes in eastern Oregon. Sam Wormington took over in 1977, moving southwest to Spokane from nearby Schweitzer Mountain in Sandpoint, Idaho.
