= Orchard Prairie, Washington =

Unincorporated community in Washington, United States

- Unincorporated community
- Location within Washington (state)
- Coordinates: 47°43′55″N 117°18′52″W
- Country: United States
- State: Washington
- County: Spokane
- Time zone: UTC-8 (Pacific (PST))
  - Summer (DST): UTC-7 (PDT)
- ZIP code: 99217
- Area code: 509
- GNIS feature ID: 1514847

Orchard Prairie is an unincorporated community in Spokane County, in the U.S. state of Washington.

== Geography ==
Located on a prairie of the same name, Orchard Prairie is immediately to the east of and above Spokane with Bigelow Gulch Road connecting the prairie to the Hillyard neighborhood of the city. To the south on the hills descending from the prairie to the Spokane River are residential suburban developments that have been built in recent decades. Argonne Road connects the prairie with them and the other suburbs in nearby Millwood and the greater Spokane Valley area.

To the north and northeast is the similar Peone Prairie.

Argonne and Bigelow Gulch roads have seen increased traffic over the years as they provide something of a shortcut for commuters traveling between north Spokane and the Spokane Valley. The original two-lane roads have been widened over the years into four-lane roads meant to handle the current volume of traffic.

== History ==
The community was named for fruit orchards near the original town site. The community retains much of its rural character, but due to its close proximity to Spokane the area has seen growth in recent decades and has taken on aspects of an exurban nature. This has led to controversy within the community, including a 2008 lawsuit brought against the county by Orchard Prairie residents.

Orchard Prairie has its own school district consisting of one school established in 1894. The school serves kindergarten through seventh grade, combined in four classrooms. Enrollment averages 65 to 80 students each year, making it the second smallest school in Spokane, Washington.
