= Arzina, Washington =

Unincorporated community in Washington, United States

- Unincorporated community
- Location within Washington (state)
- Coordinates: 48°26′23.63″N 118°7′6.96″W
- Country: United States
- State: Washington
- County: Stevens
- Time zone: UTC-8 (Pacific (PST))
  - Summer (DST): UTC-7 (PDT)
- Area code: 509
- GNIS feature ID: 1525025

Arzina is an unincorporated community in Stevens County, Washington, United States. A post office operated there from 1897 to 1911.
