= Donnie and Joe Emerson =

American musical duo

- Origin: Fruitland, Washington, United States
- Genres: Pop, Rock
- Years active: 1978–present
- Labels: Light in the Attic Records; Enterprise & Co.
- Members: Donnie Emerson; Joe Emerson

Donnie and Joe Emerson are an American musical duo. Their late 1970s work was largely unknown until it was rediscovered by a new generation of fans in the 21st century.

== Background ==
Living on a 1600-acre family farm in rural Fruitland, Washington, in the late 1970s, the brothers' father, Don Emerson Sr., encouraged his teenage sons' musical interest as they began writing and playing their own music. Don Sr. built his sons a state-of-the-art $100,000 recording studio called The Practice Place and in it they self-produced and self-released their first album, Dreamin' Wild, in 1979, an eclectic mix of rock, soul, R&B, country and funk music, on their own Enterprise & Co. label.

After Dreamin' Wild, Donnie embarked on a solo career and recorded at least two solo albums; Can I See You, recorded in Los Angeles in 1981, was not released. Whatever It Takes, a country album, was released by a private press label in 1997.

Dreamin' Wild had no commercial success until 2008, when record collector Jack Fleischer discovered the record in an antique shop in Spokane, Washington. Fleisher began to evangelize it. In July 2012, Ariel Pink's Haunted Graffiti covered the song "Baby" and in the same year Light in the Attic Records re-released Dreamin' Wild, with "Baby" becoming an underground hit. In October 2012, the brothers performed at a Light in the Attic anniversary concert in Seattle.

In the 18 months the Emerson brothers spent in their farm studio, they wrote and recorded around 70 songs. As a result, they followed up the reissue of Dreamin' Wild with the 2014 release Still Dreamin' Wild: The Lost Recordings 1979–81.

The 2022 film Dreamin' Wild is based on their story.

== Discography ==
- Dreamin' Wild (1979, 2012 reissue)
- Can I See You (1981, Donnie Emerson solo; not released)
- Through Life (1995, Donnie Emerson solo)
- Whatever It Takes (1997, Donnie Emerson solo)
- Still Dreamin' Wild: The Lost Recordings 1979–81 (2014)
- "Thoughts in My Mind" (2019, single)
- "Tonight" (2020, single)
- "Finally Found Someone" (2024, single)
- "Searching" (2024, single)
