= Rice, Washington =

- Unincorporated community
- Location within Washington (state)
- Coordinates: 48°25′44″N 118°10′13″W
- Country: United States
- State: Washington
- County: Stevens
- Elevation: 1,732 ft (528 m)

Population (2010)
  - Total: 40
- Time zone: UTC-8 (Pacific (PST))
  - Summer (DST): UTC-7 (PDT)
- ZIP code: 99167
- Area code: 509
- GNIS feature ID: 1525025

Rice is an unincorporated community in Stevens County, Washington, United States. Rice is located along the Columbia River at Washington State Route 25 and Orin-Rice Road 13.5 miles (21.7 km) south-southwest of Kettle Falls. The Rice ZIP code is 99167.
