= Fruitland, Washington =

Unincorporated community in Washington, United States

- Unincorporated community
- Location within Washington (state)
- Coordinates: 48°04′16″N 118°11′56″W
- Country: United States
- State: Washington
- County: Stevens
- Elevation: 1,824 ft (556 m)

Population
  - Total: 812
- Time zone: UTC-8 (Pacific (PST))
  - Summer (DST): UTC-7 (PDT)
- ZIP code: 99129
- Area code: 509
- GNIS feature ID: 1510981

Fruitland is an unincorporated community in Stevens County, Washington, United States. Fruitland is located along Washington State Route 25 near the Columbia River, 26.5 miles (42.6 km) northeast of Creston. Fruitland has a post office with ZIP code 99129.

First settled in 1880 by A.L. Washburn and Price, it received its name from the presence of apple orchards. According to the 2010 census, the population of Fruitland is 812 people.

== Notable residents ==
- Donnie and Joe Emerson, brother rock music duo.
