= Washington State Route 206 =

State highway in Spokane County, Washington, US

State Route 206
- Mount Spokane Park Drive
- SR 206 is highlighted in red.

Route information
- Auxiliary route of US 2
- Maintained by WSDOT
- Length: 15.30 mi (24.62 km)
- Existed: 1964–present

Major junctions
- West end: US 2 near Mead
- East end: Mount Spokane State Park

Location
- Country: United States
- State: Washington
- Counties: Spokane

Highway system
- State highways in Washington; Interstate; US; State; Scenic; Pre-1964; 1964 renumbering; Former
← I-205	→ SR 207

State Route 206 (SR 206, named the Mount Spokane Park Drive) is a 15.30-mile-long (24.62 km) state highway serving Mount Spokane State Park in the U.S. state of Washington. Beginning at U.S. Route 2 (US 2) north of Mead, the highway travels east through unincorporated Spokane County and northeast into the Selkirk Mountains, ending at the entrance to Mount Spokane State Park. The roadway, first constructed in the 1890s and reconstructed several times, was designated as SR 206 during the 1964 highway renumbering.

== Route description ==
SR 206 begins as Mount Spokane Park Drive at an intersection with US 2 north of Mead and east of Mead Flying Service Airport. The highway travels east under a BNSF Railway line and serves Mt. Spokane High School before a roundabout with Bruce Road. SR 206 turns northeast, parallel to Deadman Creek, towards Green Bluff and the Selkirk Mountains. The highway ends at the entrance of Mount Spokane State Park, and the road continues northeast to serve the Mount Spokane Ski and Snowboard Park.

Every year the Washington State Department of Transportation (WSDOT) conducts a series of surveys on its highways in the state to measure traffic volume. This is expressed in terms of annual average daily traffic (AADT), which is a measure of traffic volume for any average day of the year. In 2011, WSDOT calculated that between 210 and 10,000 vehicles per day used the highway, mostly in the Mead area.

== History ==
During the 1890s, a road connecting Mead to Mount Carlton, later renamed to Mount Spokane, via Deadman Creek was constructed. The road to Mount Spokane was paved in 1921, and was later improved in the late 1940s. The Mount Spokane road was designated as SR 206, extending from US 2 north of Mead to Mount Spokane State Park, during the 1964 highway renumbering. The state legislature passed a bill creating the highway in 1963 with the designation of Secondary State Highway 6C, which was never signed. SR 206 was improved and re-paved in 1985, but remains prone to closures. Since 1964, no major revisions to the route of the highway have occurred, however the route was shortened by 0.09 miles (0.14 km) in 1999 after the construction of a new rail overpass.

== Major intersections ==
The entire highway is in Spokane County.

Location	mi	km	Destinations	Notes
Mead	0.00	0.00	US 2 (Newport Highway) – Spokane, Newport	Southern terminus
Mount Spokane State Park	15.30	24.62	Northern terminus	
1.000 mi = 1.609 km; 1.000 km = 0.621 mi
