= Evans, Washington =

Unincorporated community in Washington, United States

- Unincorporated community
- Location within Washington (state)
- Coordinates: 48°42′49″N 118°01′31″W
- Country: United States
- State: Washington
- County: Stevens
- Elevation: 1,319 ft (402 m)
- Time zone: UTC-8 (Pacific (PST))
  - Summer (DST): UTC-7 (PDT)
- ZIP code: 99126
- Area code: 509
- GNIS feature ID: 1519396

Evans is an unincorporated community in Stevens County, Washington, United States. Evans is located along the Columbia River and Washington State Route 25 4 miles (6.4 km) northeast of Marcus. Evans has a post office with ZIP code 99126.

Evans was named in 1901 for local quarry owner J.H. Evans.
