= Mount Spokane State Park =

State park in Washington (state), United States

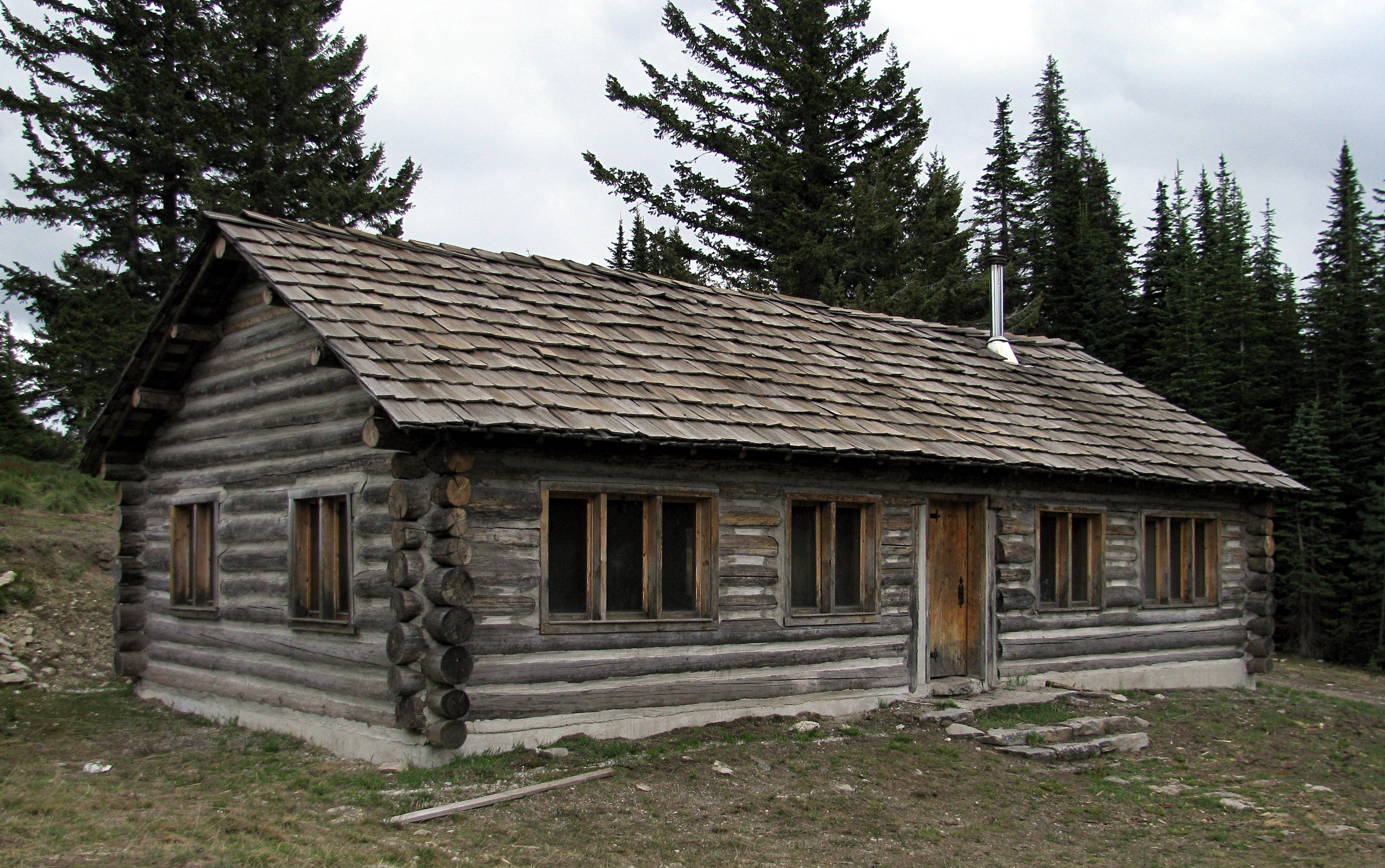
- Caretaker's cabin designed by E. O. Fieldstad and built by Elmer Highberg

- Location within Washington (state) Location within the United States
- Location: Spokane County, Washington, United States
- Coordinates: 47°55′25″N 117°06′44″W
- Area: 12,444 acres (5,036 ha)
- Elevation: 5,880 ft (1,790 m)
- Established: 1927
- Administrator: Washington State Parks and Recreation Commission
- Visitors: 550,921 (in 2024)
- Website: Official website

Mount Spokane State Park is a public recreation area in the Northwestern United States, located in the Selkirk Mountains, 23 miles (37 km) northeast of the city of Spokane, Washington. The state park surrounds 5,883-foot (1,793 m) Mount Spokane and other peaks including Mount Kit Carson, Beauty Mountain, and Quartz Mountain.

The park receives 300 inches (25 ft; 7.6 m) of snow annually and is home to Mount Spokane Ski and Snowboard Park as well as an extensive system of trails for hiking, biking, and horseback riding. As of 2025, Washington State Parks reported its acreage as 12,444 acres (19.4 mi^{2}; 50.4 km^{2}), making it Washington's largest state park, well ahead of Riverside State Park (9,194 acres (14.4 mi^{2}; 37.2 km^{2})) which lies 23 miles to the southwest.

== History ==
The park was dedicated with 1500 acres in 1927. During the 1930s, workers with the Civilian Conservation Corps (CCC) planted grass, constructed picnicking and parking areas, constructed trails and shelters, and improved roads.

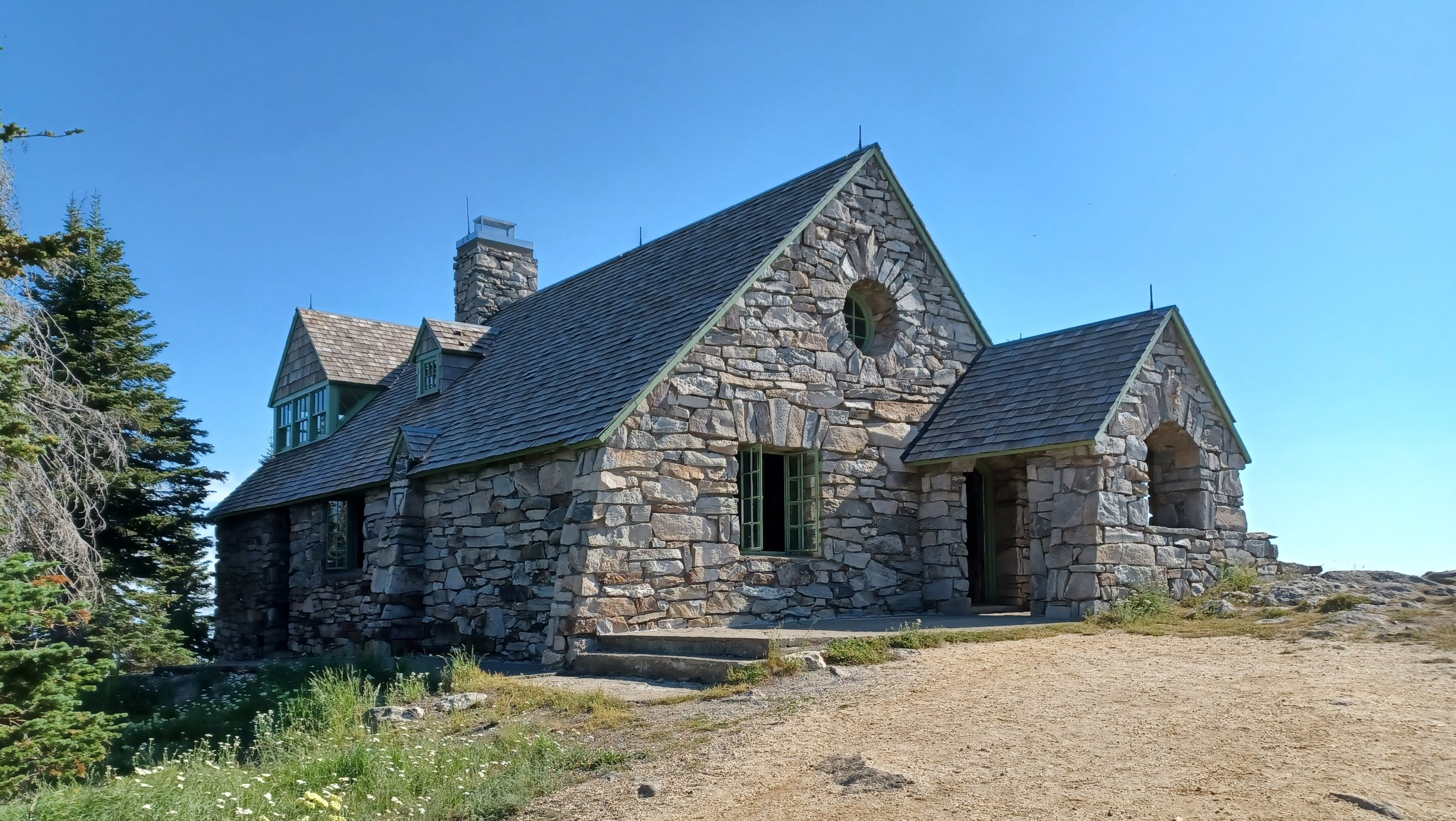
Vista House

=== Vista House ===
Vista House was designed by architect, H. C. Bertelsen, as was the caretaker's cabin, although an earlier design for Vista House had been prepared by state park architect Charles Saunders. The caretaker's cabin was built by Elmer Highberg. Some sources state that Vista House was built by the CCC. However, according to the State of Washington's Cultural Resources Management Plan (2009), a local contractor, E.O. Fieldstad, won the contract with a "low bid of $4,693," and built Vista House. The publication states: "Its existence near the site of the Mount Spokane CCC camp may have contributed to the present impression held by many that the Vista House was constructed by the CCC."

=== Timeline ===
1909	Frances Cook, owner of the summit, builds a toll road to within 3 miles (5 km) of the summit.
1927	Mt. Spokane State Park is officially dedicated 99 years ago at 1,500 acres (6.1 km^{2}).
1929	William H. Cowles, Jr. donates 640 acres (2.6 km^{2}) of land to the park.
1930s	The Spokane Ski Club, the Selkirk Ski Club, and the Spokane Mountaineers purchase over 500 acres (2.0 km^{2}) on the mountain for construction of lodges, rope-tows, and ski jump hills. The road is completed to the summit.
1932	A "monster" sized Sun Globe was erected at the top of the mountain on June 26 by the Spokane Federation of Women's Organizations. Its purpose was to reflect the sun's rays for many miles in a tribute to fatherhood, as well as being a permanent memorial to the people of Spokane as being children of the sun. A dedication ceremony took place and Mrs. J. B. Dodd, the originator of Father's Day, unveiled the globe. As of 2011, the Sun Globe and its base are absent, and it is not known how long it stayed in place.
1933	Vista House is built by local contractor E.O.Fieldstad
1935	CCC sets up camp on Beauty Mountain to improve the road and construct other facilities.
1939	The Spokane Chapter of the Conservation League buys 320 acres (1.3 km^{2}) for the park for $1,500 (south half of Section 21) to save virgin timber from logging and fire.
1946	The first double chairlift in the world is put into operation on the south face of the summit.
1952	A master plan is proposed for the park which includes over 24,000 acres (97.1 km^{2}) and designates all of Mt. Spokane proper for downhill ski purposes. This proposal is not implemented.
1953	KXLY-TV becomes operational from the summit.
1955	Lodge #1 and Chairlift #1 are constructed.
1961	Concessionaire A.E.Mettler constructs Lodge #2 and Lift #2
1965	Another master plan is developed by State Parks to include 11,592 acres (46.9 km^{2}) of land, 958 acres (3.9 km^{2}) of which were allocated for general outdoor recreation with the remainder to be administered as a natural environment area. This plan is not adopted by the Parks Commission.
1974	Mt. Spokane Park's official classification is changed from recreation area to state park and a new philosophy is applied: State Parks are to continuously service man’s spiritual, mental, and leisure time physical needs through the use of selected outstanding natural resources. This is to be accomplished by providing a full range of non-urban outdoor educational and recreational services and opportunities to a wide range of users with diversified interests and needs.
1978	A coordinated trail system plan is developed to, among other things, reduce conflicting recreational uses by specific allocation of park lands to user groups. The plan quickly became out of date and was never fully implemented.
1985	The Parks Commission formally designates the Ragged Ridge Natural Area within Mt. Spokane State Park.
1993	The Park contains about 13,643 acres (55.2 km^{2}) of land, not including Quartz Mountain. Most of this land was donated or obtained during the Great Depression through property forfeitures. The Mt. Spokane State Park Alpine Ski Area Working Group Interface Subcommittee issues a report concerning the future of the Park. Among other things, it recommends a comprehensive planning process.
1994	State Parks proposes to classify areas of the Park as Natural Forest Areas. Several alternatives are proposed. The Mt. Spokane Planning Task Force Steering Committee is formed and issues its report. The group recommends a comprehensive planning process as well as the formation of a permanent, local Park advisory committee.
1995	Mt. Spokane State Park Advisory Committee appointed by Parks Commission begins monthly meetings in Spokane. Friends of Mt. Spokane State Park also formed.
1997	Mt. Spokane 2000, a non-profit group of local businesses and civic leaders, is approved as the new concessionaire for the alpine ski area to replace the Mt. Spokane Ski Corporation which operated the area for 20 years.
1999	A Classification and Management Plan (CAMP) process is started for the Park. New land classifications approved including about 10% as Recreation Area, about 58% as Resource Recreation Area, less than 1% as Heritage Area, about 22% as Natural Forest Area, about 4% as Natural Area Preserve, and about 5% as yet unclassified pending completion of the Ski Area Plan and further Commission consideration.

== Activities and amenities ==
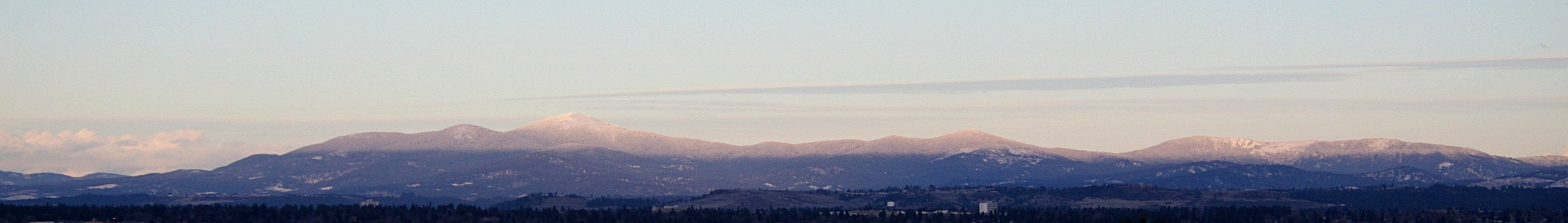
Mt Spokane and surrounding mountains, in which are located within the state park

The park has 100 miles (160 km) of trails for hiking, biking, and horseback riding. Trails range from easy (the 3-mile (4.8 km) Burping Brook Loop) to difficult (the 13-mile (21 km) ‘Round the Mountain Trail). Winter activities include downhill and cross-country skiing, snowmobiling and snowshoeing. Camping and picnicking are also available. Bald Knob campground is generally open from May to September. There are 7 primary trail-heads to park at from Bear Creek Lodge right before the entrance of the park to the summit parking and vista house. During the winter a Sno-park permit is required at both the Lower Selkirk Sno-Park Parking Lot and the Upper Selkirk Lodge Sno-Park Parking Lot.
