= Mount Spokane =

Mountain in Washington (state), United States

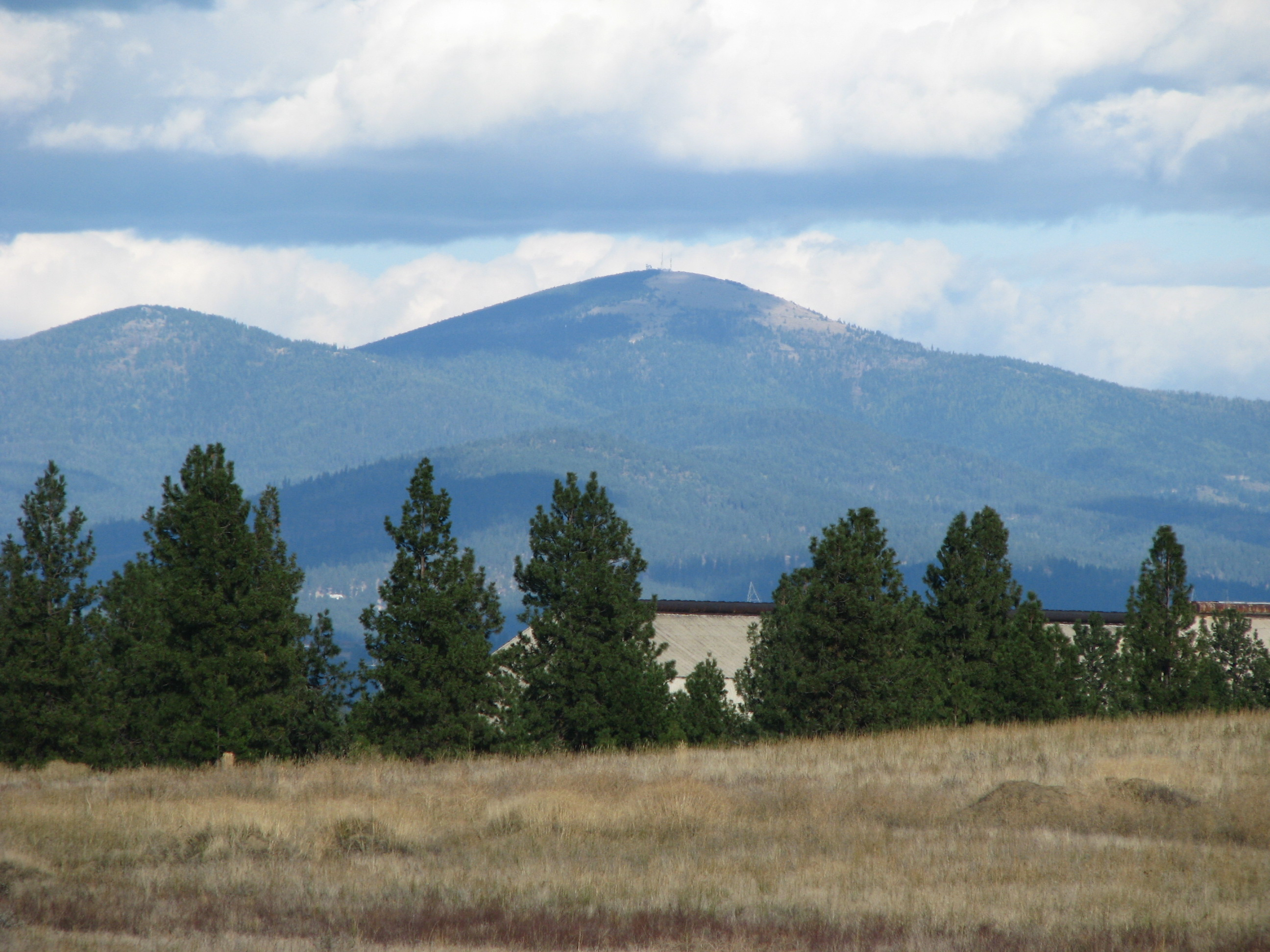
- View from northeast Spokane in 2008

Highest point
- Elevation: 5,887 ft (1,794 m) NAVD 88
- Prominence: 3,503 ft (1,068 m)
- Isolation: 53.5 mi
- Listing: Washington isolated peaks 10th; Washington prominent peaks 34th; Washington county high points 21st
- Coordinates: 47°55′25″N 117°06′44″W

Geography
- Location within Washington (state) Location within the United States
- Location: Spokane County, Washington, U.S.
- Parent range: Selkirk Mountains
- Topo map: USGS Mount Spokane

Climbing
- Easiest route: Highway 206

Mount Spokane [elevation 5,887 feet (1,794 m)]—previously known as Mount Baldy until 1912 due to its pronounced bald spot—is a mountain in the northwest United States, located northeast of Spokane, Washington. Its summit is the highest point in Spokane County, and it is one of the tallest peaks in the Inland Northwest. Mount Spokane is surrounded by Mount Spokane State Park, Washington's largest at 13,919 acres (56.3 km^{2}). One of the well-known features is a bald spot on the corner of the west and south parts of the mountain.

Mount Kit Carson—the second highest peak in Spokane County—is located only 1.02 miles (1.64 km) to the east, and with a topographic prominence of only 322 feet (98 m) could be considered a satellite peak of Mount Spokane.

A non-profit organization operates the Mount Spokane Ski and Snowboard Park, located on the southwest portion of the mountain.

== Climate ==
Mount Spokane has a dry summer humid continental climate (Köppen Dsb) with a subarctic climate (Köppen Dfc) influence.

Climate data for Mount Spokane 47.9223 N, 117.1155 W, Elevation: 5,554 ft (1,693 m) (1991–2020 normals)
Month	Jan	Feb	Mar	Apr	May	Jun	Jul	Aug	Sep	Oct	Nov	Dec	Year
Mean daily maximum °F (°C)	28.0 (−2.2)	30.7 (−0.7)	36.9 (2.7)	45.0 (7.2)	54.1 (12.3)	60.5 (15.8)	71.5 (21.9)	71.8 (22.1)	62.0 (16.7)	47.6 (8.7)	33.1 (0.6)	26.9 (−2.8)	47.3 (8.5)
Daily mean °F (°C)	23.6 (−4.7)	25.2 (−3.8)	30.1 (−1.1)	36.9 (2.7)	46.1 (7.8)	51.2 (10.7)	61.1 (16.2)	61.5 (16.4)	52.8 (11.6)	40.1 (4.5)	28.7 (−1.8)	22.1 (−5.5)	40.0 (4.4)
Mean daily minimum °F (°C)	19.1 (−7.2)	19.7 (−6.8)	23.4 (−4.8)	28.8 (−1.8)	38.1 (3.4)	42.0 (5.6)	50.7 (10.4)	51.1 (10.6)	43.5 (6.4)	32.6 (0.3)	24.4 (−4.2)	17.3 (−8.2)	32.6 (0.3)
Average precipitation inches (mm)	5.34 (136)	3.77 (96)	5.72 (145)	3.74 (95)	2.94 (75)	2.82 (72)	1.29 (33)	1.02 (26)	2.05 (52)	3.43 (87)	6.03 (153)	5.81 (148)	43.96 (1,118)
Source: PRISM Climate Group

Climate data for Mount Spokane, Washington, July 1953 – December 1972
Month	Jan	Feb	Mar	Apr	May	Jun	Jul	Aug	Sep	Oct	Nov	Dec	Year
Record high °F (°C)	47 (8)	50 (10)	54 (12)	72 (22)	77 (25)	83 (28)	89 (32)	89 (32)	81 (27)	68 (20)	59 (15)	46 (8)	89 (32)
Mean daily maximum °F (°C)	23.1 (−4.9)	27.6 (−2.4)	30.3 (−0.9)	38.2 (3.4)	49.0 (9.4)	57.4 (14.1)	66.5 (19.2)	66.0 (18.9)	56.4 (13.6)	43.1 (6.2)	32.5 (0.3)	26.5 (−3.1)	43.0 (6.1)
Daily mean °F (°C)	18.1 (−7.7)	23.0 (−5.0)	24.8 (−4.0)	31.5 (−0.3)	42.0 (5.6)	49.2 (9.6)	57.9 (14.4)	57.4 (14.1)	48.6 (9.2)	36.9 (2.7)	27.5 (−2.5)	21.7 (−5.7)	36.6 (2.5)
Mean daily minimum °F (°C)	13.1 (−10.5)	18.4 (−7.6)	19.4 (−7.0)	24.9 (−3.9)	35.0 (1.7)	41.1 (5.1)	49.3 (9.6)	48.8 (9.3)	40.9 (4.9)	30.8 (−0.7)	22.5 (−5.3)	16.9 (−8.4)	30.1 (−1.1)
Record low °F (°C)	−23 (−31)	−17 (−27)	−20 (−29)	10 (−12)	15 (−9)	21 (−6)	25 (−4)	28 (−2)	18 (−8)	4 (−16)	−17 (−27)	−28 (−33)	−28 (−33)
Average precipitation inches (mm)	5.83 (148)	4.61 (117)	4.94 (125)	3.49 (89)	2.78 (71)	2.71 (69)	1.30 (33)	1.54 (39)	2.75 (70)	3.71 (94)	6.24 (158)	6.25 (159)	46.15 (1,172)
Average snowfall inches (cm)	39.1 (99)	20.5 (52)	25.9 (66)	10.9 (28)	5.0 (13)	0.6 (1.5)	0.2 (0.51)	0 (0)	1.9 (4.8)	8.1 (21)	18.2 (46)	32.2 (82)	162.5 (413)
Source: Western Regional Climate Center

== Gallery ==
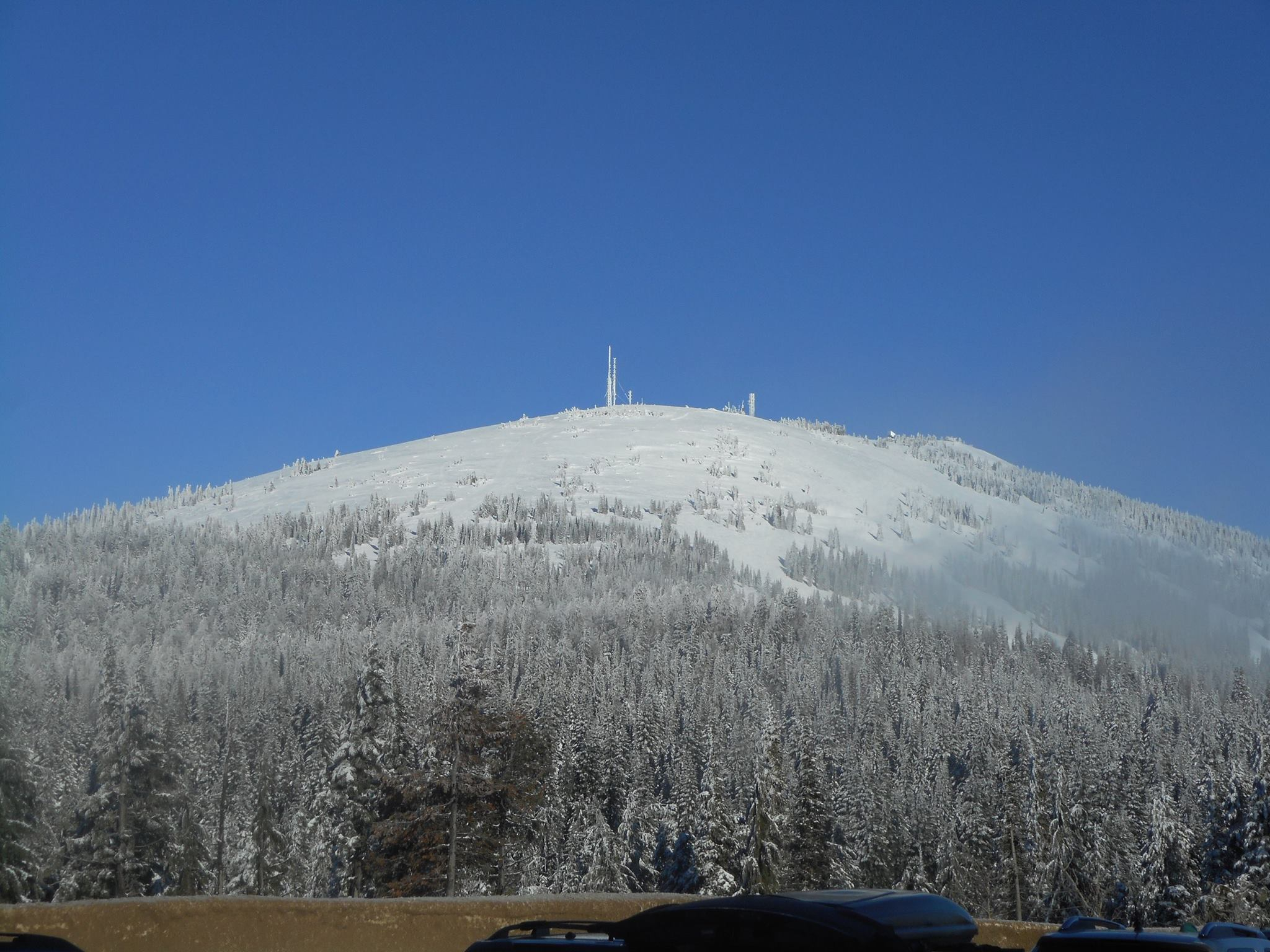
View of the summit in 2016

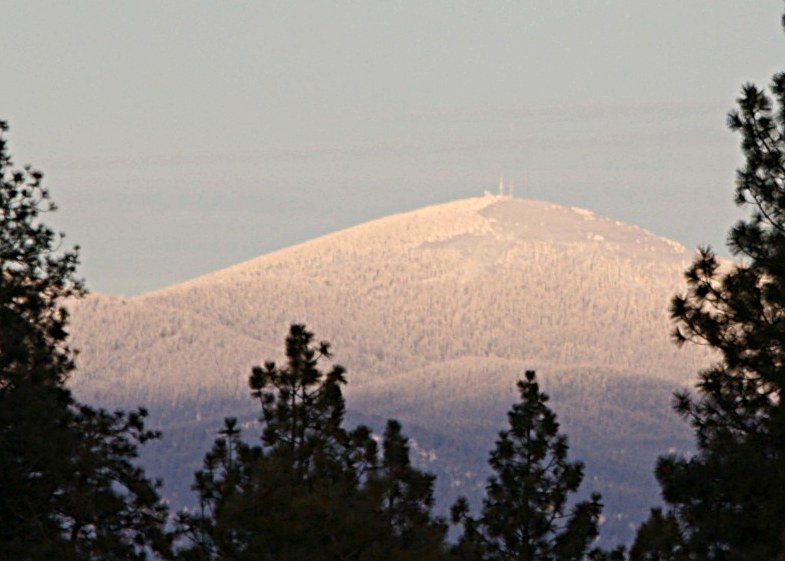
View from the southwest in 2007

View from the southwest in the 1920s
