= Michigan's 29th Senate district =

American legislative district

Michigan's 29th State Senate district
Senator
Winnie Brinks; D–Grand Rapids
- Demographics: 55% White; 16.9% Black; 18.6% Hispanic; 4% Asian; 0.1% Native American; 0.5% Other; 4.9% Multiracial
- Population (2024): 266,073

Michigan's 29th Senate district is one of 38 districts in the Michigan Senate. The 29th district was created by the 1850 Michigan Constitution, as the 1835 constitution only permitted a maximum of eight senate districts. It has been represented by Democrat Winnie Brinks since 2019, succeeding Republican Dave Hildenbrand.

== Geography ==
District 29 encompasses part of Kent County.

=== 2011 Apportionment Plan ===
District 29, as dictated by the 2011 Apportionment Plan, was based in Grand Rapids, which also covered the surrounding Kent County communities of East Grand Rapids, Lowell, Forest Hills, Cascade Township, Grand Rapids Township, Ada Township, and Caledonia Township.

The district was located entirely within Michigan's 3rd congressional district, and overlapped with the 73rd, 75th, 76th, and 86th districts of the Michigan House of Representatives.

== List of senators ==
Senator	Party	Dates	Residence	Notes
Daniel S. Johnson	Democratic	1853–1854	Zilwaukee	
Henry J. Alvord	Democratic	1855–1856	Lapeer	
Smith Lapham	Republican	1857–1858	Laphamville	
Lewis Porter	Republican	1859–1860	Grand Rapids	
Solomon L. Withey	Republican	1861–1862	Grand Rapids	
Milton C. Watkins	Republican	1863–1866	Ashley	
Henry Seymour	Republican	1867–1868	Grand Rapids	
Peter R. L. Pierce	Republican	1869–1870	Grand Rapids	
Byron D. Ball	Republican	1871–1872	Grand Rapids	
Henry S. Clubb	Republican	1873–1874	Grand Haven	
Charles D. Nelson	Republican	1875–1876	Muskegon	
Columbus V. Tyler	Democratic	1877–1880	Bay City	
Charles F. Gibson	Republican	1881–1882	Bay City	
Freeman O. Gullifer	Republican	1883–1884	Au Sable	
Charles R. Henry	Republican	1885–1886	Au Sable	
Walter W. Barton	Republican	1887–1888	Leland	
Roswell Leavitt	Republican	1889–1890	Bellaire	
Robert R. Wilkinson	Republican	1891–1892	Eastport	
James D. Turnbull	Democratic	1893–1894	Alpena	
Ezra C. Barnum	Republican	1895–1898	Petoskey	
Daniel P. McMullen	Republican	1899–1902	Cheboygan	
William L. Curtis	Republican	1903–1906	Petoskey	
Fred R. Ming	Republican	1907–1910	Cheboygan	
Frank D. Scott	Republican	1911–1914	Alpena	
J. Lee Morford	Republican	1915–1918	Gaylord	
Herbert F. Baker	Republican	1919–1922	Weadock	
William J. Pearson	Republican	1923–1926	Boyne Falls	
Calvin A. Campbell	Republican	1927–1933	Indian River	Died in office.
Otto W. Bishop	Republican	1935–1948	Alpena	
Frank Andrews	Republican	1949–1960	Hillman	
Thomas F. Schweigert	Republican	1961–1964	Petoskey	
Garland B. Lane	Democratic	1965–1974	Flint	
Dale Kildee	Democratic	1975–1977	Flint	Resigned.
Harold J. Scott	Democratic	1977–1982	Flint	
Gary G. Corbin	Democratic	1983–1986	Clio	
John D. Cherry	Democratic	1987–1994	Clio	
Joe Conroy	Democratic	1995–1998	Flint	
Robert L. Emerson	Democratic	1999–2002	Flint	
Bill Hardiman	Republican	2003–2010	Kentwood	
Dave Hildenbrand	Republican	2011–2018	Lowell	
Winnie Brinks	Democratic	2019–present	Grand Rapids	

== Recent election results ==
=== 2020s ===
2026 Michigan Senate election
Primary election
Party	Candidate	Votes	%
General election
Democratic	Abbie Groff-Blaszak	75,103	68.49
Republican	Brady A. Middleton	34,556	31.51
Total votes		109,659	100
Democratic hold			

2022 Michigan Senate election, District 29
Party	Candidate	Votes	%
Democratic	Winnie Brinks (incumbent)	59,407	60.3
Republican	Tommy Brann	39,115	39.7
Total votes		98,522	100
Democratic hold			

=== 2018 ===
2018 Michigan Senate election, District 29
Primary election
Party	Candidate	Votes	%
Republican	Chris Afendoulis	19,374	81.3
Republican	Daniel Oesch	4,445	18.7
Total votes		23,819	100
General election
Democratic	Winnie Brinks	70,715	56.9
Republican	Chris Afendoulis	50,225	40.4
Libertarian	Robert VanNoller	1,840	1.5
Working Class	Louis Palus	1,445	1.2
Total votes		124,225	100
Democratic gain from Republican			

=== 2014 ===
2014 Michigan Senate election, District 29
Primary election
Party	Candidate	Votes	%
Democratic	Lance Penny	4,219	51.3
Democratic	Michael Scruggs	4,008	48.7
Total votes		8,227	100
General election
Republican	Dave Hildenbrand (incumbent)	47,200	57.9
Democratic	Lance Penny	34,278	42.1
Total votes		81,478	100
Republican hold			

=== Federal and statewide results ===
Year	Office	Results
2020	President	Biden 61.5 – 36.4%
2018	Senate	Stabenow 57.0 – 40.9%
2018	Governor	Whitmer 58.7 – 38.4%
2016	President	Clinton 54.3 – 39.2%
2014	Senate	Peters 50.0 – 46.2%
2014	Governor	Snyder 57.1 – 40.8%
2012	President	Obama 52.7 – 46.3%
2012	Senate	Stabenow 52.5 – 44.1%

== Historical district boundaries ==
Map	Description	Apportionment Plan	Notes
	Genesee County (part); Genesee Township (part); Flint	1964 Apportionment Plan	
	Genesee County (part); Atlas Township; Burton; Davison; Davison Township; Flint (part); Forest Township; Genesee Township; Grand Blanc Township; Grand Blanc Township; Richfield Township; Thetford Township	1972 Apportionment Plan	
	Genesee County (part); Argentine Township; Atlas Township; Burton; Clio; Davison; Davison Township; Fenton; Fenton Township; Forest Township; Gaines Township; Genesee Township (part); Grand Blanc; Grand Blanc Township; Montrose Township; Mount Morris; Mount Morris Township; Mundy Township; Richfield Township; Thetford Township; Vienna Township	1982 Apportionment Plan	
	Genesee County (part); Argentine Township; Clayton Township; Fenton; Fenton Township; Flint; Flint Township; Flushing; Flushing Township; Gaines Township; Linden; Mundy Township; Swartz Creek	1992 Apportionment Plan	
	Kent County (part); Cascade Township; Grand Rapids; Grattan Township; Kentwood; Lowell; Lowell Township; Vergennes Township	2001 Apportionment Plan	
	Kent County (part); Ada Township; Bowne Township; Caledonia Township; Cascade Township; East Grand Rapids; Grand Rapids; Grand Rapids Township; Lowell; Lowell Township	2011 Apportionment Plan	
