= Don Magnuson =

American politician (1911–1979)

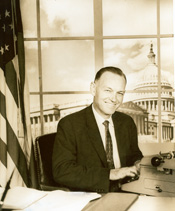

Member of the U.S. House of Representatives from Washington
- In office January 3, 1953 – January 3, 1963
- Preceded by: District established
- Succeeded by: K. William Stinson
- Constituency: At-large (1953-1959); 7th district (1959-1963)

Personal details
- Born: Donald Hammer Magnuson; March 7, 1911 Freeman, Washington, U.S.
- Died: October 5, 1979 (aged 68) Seattle, Washington, U.S.
- Cause of death: Heart attack
- Resting place: Evergreen Washelli; Memorial Park, Seattle
- Party: Democratic
- Education: University of Washington, 1931; Spokane University (attended)
- Profession: Journalist

Donald Hammer Magnuson (March 7, 1911 – October 5, 1979) was an American journalist and politician. Magnuson worked as an investigative journalist for The Daily Olympian and The Seattle Times before representing the state of Washington in the United States House of Representatives for five terms as a Democrat. He was not related to Washington's long-serving U.S. Senator Warren Magnuson.

== Early years ==
Magnuson was born on a farm near Freeman, Washington, in rural Spokane County, the son of Ellis William Magnuson and Ida (Hammer) Magnuson. He attended the public schools and Spokane University from 1926 to 1928, then transferred to the University of Washington in Seattle, earning a bachelor's degree in 1931. After graduation, he worked as a harvester and then as a riveter in an aircraft factory.

== Journalism career ==
Magnuson was a newspaper reporter for The Daily Olympian and The Seattle Times from 1934 to 1952. In 1942, he wrote a series of reports about loafing in the Seattle-Tacoma Shipyards. He was instrumental in obtaining the pardon of Clarence Boggie, who was wrongly convicted of murder. He earned a Heywood Broun Award for his coverage and was nominated for a Pulitzer Prize for Local Reporting in 1949 by the managing editor of The Seattle Times. His work was made into a radio episode on a national radio show, The Big Story, in February 1949. At another time, his reporting engendered so much response that 17-year-old Joe Maish's death sentence was commuted to life imprisonment 66 minutes before he was to hang.

In 1950, Magnuson wrote a series on alcoholism. He interviewed 6,000 men who had been treated over 15 years. He described the "conditioned-reflect treatment" which was intended to create an aversion to alcohol. This treatment was based on Pavlov's work on conditioned reflex. The treatment for alcoholism was for the staff at the sanitarium to give a patient alcohol and at the same time induce nausea with an additive.

== Political career ==
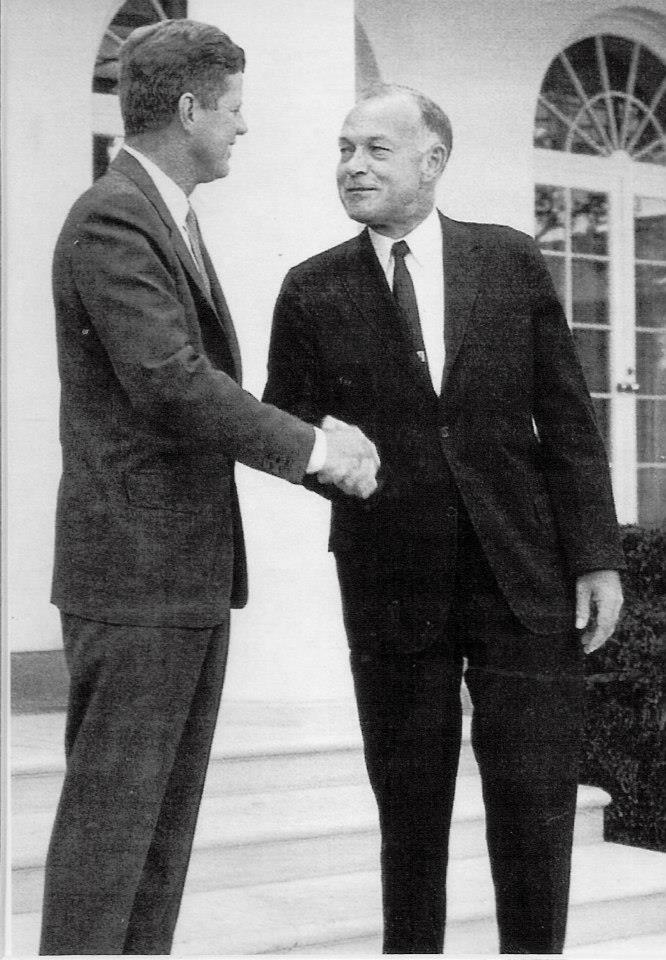
President John F. Kennedy meets with Magnuson at the White House, ca. 1962.

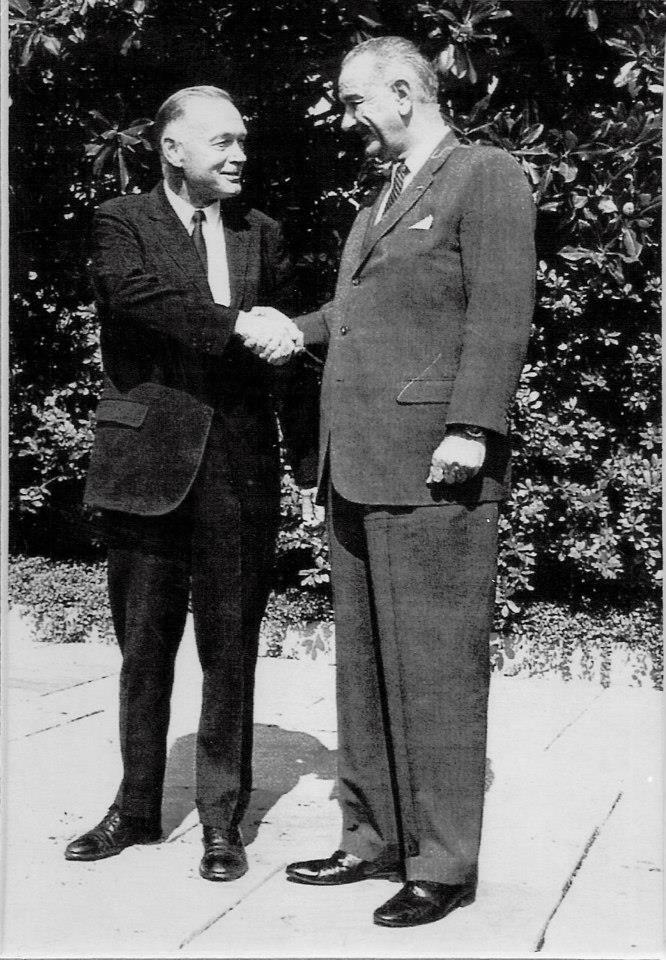
President Lyndon Johnson and Magnuson meet, ca. 1964.

Magnuson was elected in 1952 as a Democrat and was re-elected four times, serving from January 1953 until January 1963. Magnuson was named to the Committee on Merchant Marines and Fisheries in 1955. During his time in Congress he served on the Appropriations Committee subcommittee on Department of State, Justice and Judiciary, and the Department of the Interior. He also served on the Public Works Committee with oversight over the United States Army Corps of Engineers, Bureau of Reclamation, and the Atomic Energy Commission.

Magnuson was on the House floor during the 1954 United States Capitol shooting, when Puerto Rican nationalists shot up the floor of the 83rd Congress in 1954, and he was shot through the sleeve. The nationalists, identified as Lolita Lebrón, Rafael Cancel Miranda, Andres Figueroa Cordero, and Irving Flores Rodríguez, unfurled a Puerto Rican flag and began shooting at the 240 representatives who were debating an immigration bill. He was on the phone quickly after with The Seattle Times during the ruckus to give them the scoop, which his colleague and future Speaker of the House Tip O'Neill recorded in his memoirs.

In 1958, Magnuson escaped serious injury in a plane crash. He appeared in a newspaper photo, a hospital identification tag pinned to his blood spotted shirt, sitting in Northwestern Hospital in Minneapolis, where he was taken following the Northwest Airlines plane crash. Magnuson was one of 60 passengers who escaped death when the plane crashed into a corn field and burst into flames. His opponent for Congress that year complained about all of the sympathetic free publicity Magnuson received as a result of the incident. At least 11 U.S. Army service members were on board, and Magnuson recommended that Private First Class Raymond C. Maruschak receive the Soldier's Medal, crediting him with saving many lives that day. Maruschak and another soldier ripped a hole in the fuselage large enough to get all of the passengers out.

On January 30, 1959, Magnuson introduced a bill to establish a shield law to keep reporters from having to reveal their sources. On February 2, 1959, he introduced a bill to grant a second income tax exemption to college students who held down a job. On February 7, 1959, he was named to the board of oversight of the U.S. Air Force Academy at Colorado Springs for 4 consecutive years. On May 22, 1959, Magnuson voted for an addition to the public works bill in an Appropriations subcommittee for $724,000 to start the Greater Wenatchee reclamation project. On August 4, 1959, Magnuson said about the upcoming Khrushchev visit, "What Khrushchev sees here may help guard against a fatal miscalculation on his part."

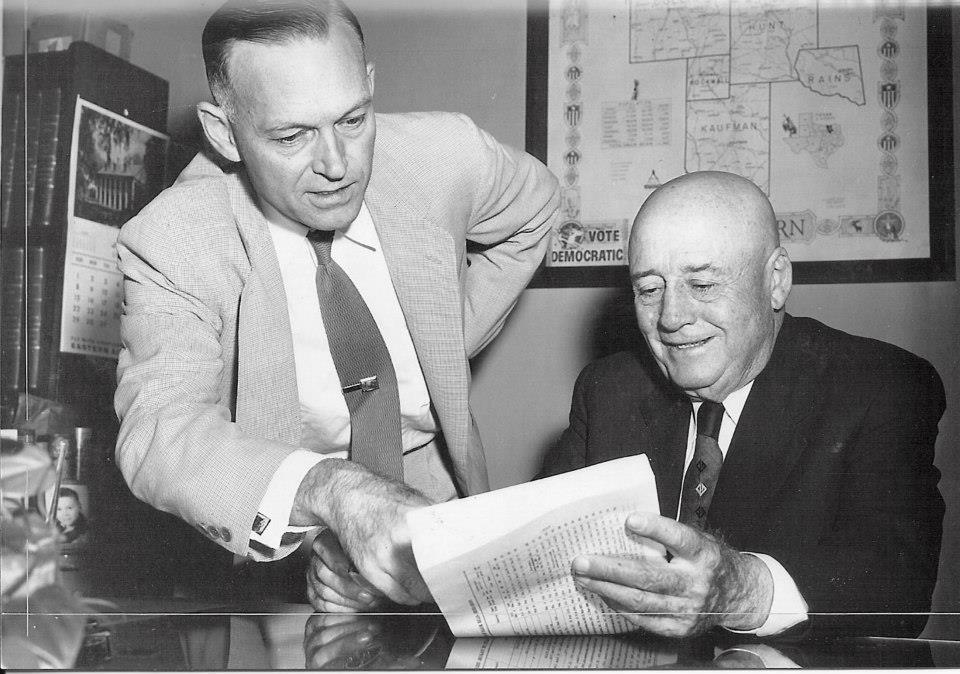
Congressman Don Magnuson and Speaker of the House Sam Rayburn discussing legislation in Speaker Rayburn's office, July 28, 1956.

On January 21, 1960, the Bellingham Labor News said that as a member of the Public Works Committee, Magnuson sponsored a resolution to authorize the U.S. Army Corps of Engineers to review flood control studies in western Washington. On that same day, he was appointed to become a charter member of the Democratic Study Group. In 1960, as a member of the Appropriations Committee, he voted against an additional $73 million for the development of nuclear airplanes, according to The Labor Journal.

On September 18, 1960, Magnuson was arrested for being drunk in public. He posted a $20 bail.

Following an extremely close victory in 1960, Magnuson lost his bid for a sixth term in 1962. He was employed by the Department of the Interior from 1963 to 1969, and by the Department of Labor from 1969 to 1973.

== Death and legacy ==
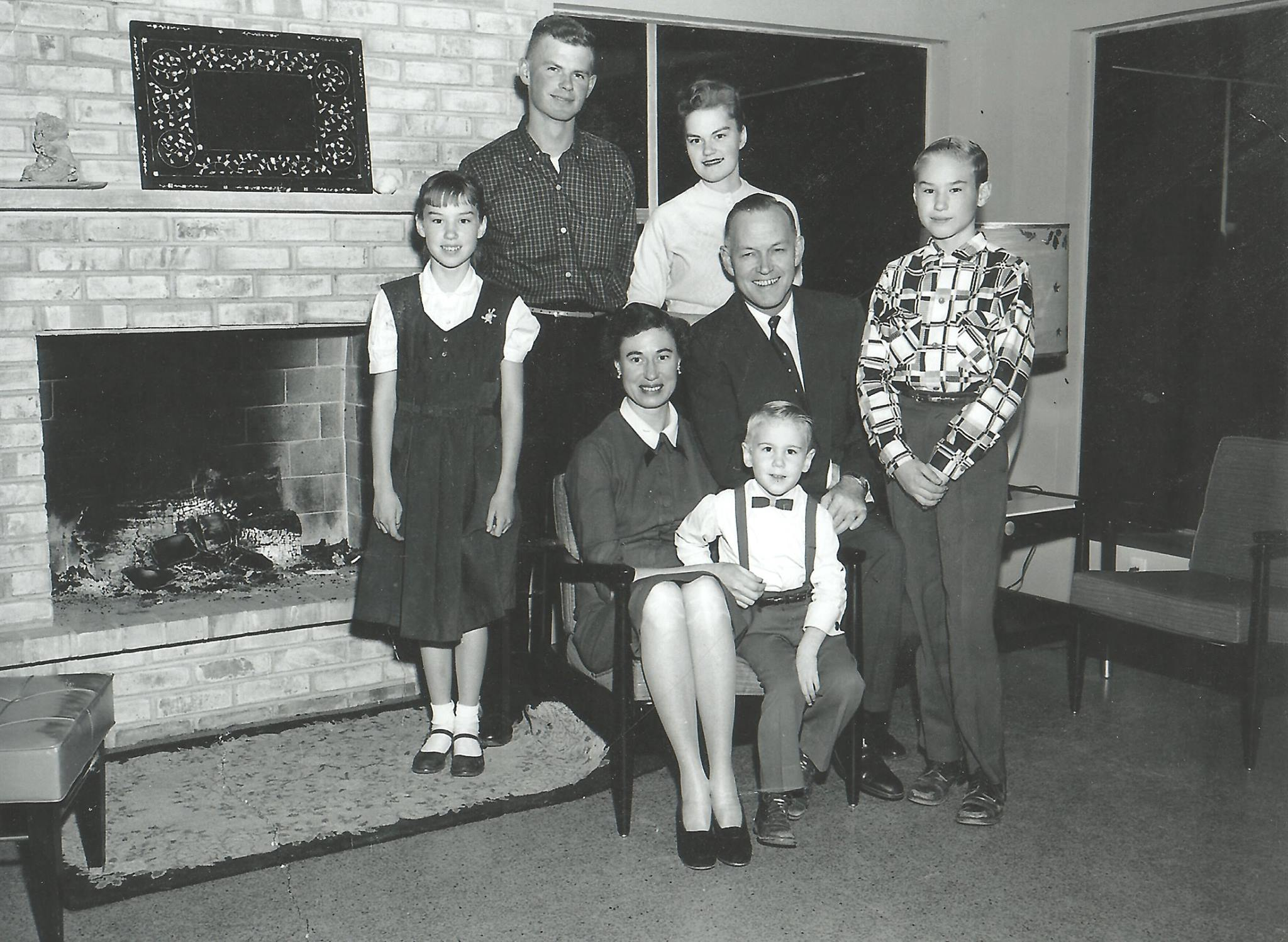
Campaign photograph for Congressman Don Magnuson with his family.

After he retired in 1973, he resided in Seattle, where he died on October 5, 1979, and was interred in Evergreen Washelli Memorial Park in north Seattle. His papers are housed at the University of Washington Libraries; the collection contains 18 cubic feet (0.5 m^{3}) of legislative papers and 8 film strip reels relating to his various political campaigns.

U.S. House of Representatives
Preceded by New district formed after 1950 Census	Member of the U.S. House of Representatives from Washington's at-large congressional district 1953–1959	Succeeded by At-large district abolished
New district	Member of the U.S. House of Representatives from Washington's 7th congressional district 1959–1963	Succeeded by K. William Stinson
