= Valleyford, Washington =

Unincorporated community in Washington, United States

- Unincorporated community
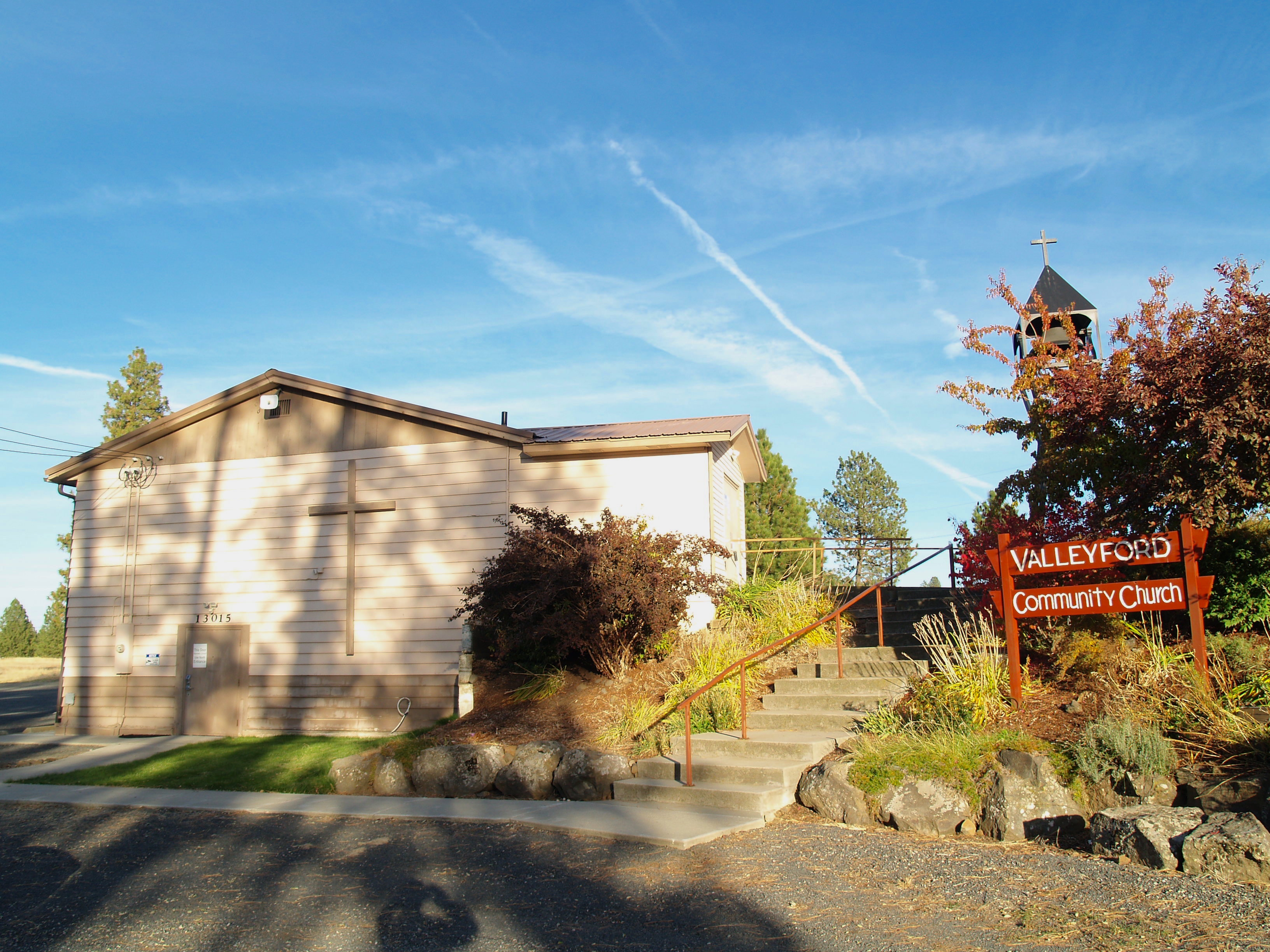

- Location within Washington (state)
- Coordinates: 47°31′55″N 117°14′21″W
- Country: United States
- State: Washington
- County: Spokane
- Elevation: 2,487 ft (758 m)
- Time zone: UTC-8 (Pacific (PST))
  - Summer (DST): UTC-7 (PDT)
- ZIP code: 99036
- Area code: 509
- GNIS feature ID: 1512756

Valleyford is an unincorporated community in Spokane County, Washington, United States. Valleyford has a post office with ZIP code 99036. Valleyford was listed to have a population of 2,913 according to the 2010 United States census.

== History ==
Prior to the arrival of Europeans, the Coeur d'Alene people knew the Valleyford area for its bountiful camas harvests.

European settlement began in the second half of the 1800s when the Mullan Road began bringing settlers into the Inland Northwest. The road split into two branches at Cataldo Mission in present day Idaho, with one branch taking a northern route around Lake Coeur d'Alene and the other taking a southern route. Valleyford was located near where the two branches came back together.

Another transportation breakthrough for the region provided a boon for settlement in Valleyford when the Spokane and Inland Empire Railroad, an electrified, interurban railway, came through the community in 1908. The arrival of the railway connected the community with the region's center of population in Spokane, as well as other small towns around the Palouse. It also brought electricity to the community.

Soon after the arrival of the railroad, Valleyford began to grow and community officials expected that growth to continue. The town was platted for more growth than would end up occurring, however, as the community's fortunes took a big hit during the Great Depression and never recovered.

A post office called Valleyford has been in operation since 1907. The origin of the name Valleyford is obscure.

== Geography ==
Valleyford is 12.5 miles (20.1 km) southeast of downtown Spokane on the Palouse Highway, a two lane road connecting Spokane with State Route 27 about a mile east of Valleyford. The community is surrounded by farmland and forests on the northern edge of the Palouse, a wheat and legume growing region extending across southeastern Washington. California Creek, a tributary of Latah Creek, cuts a valley along the north and eastern edges of the community.

Spokane County Fire District 8 has a station in Valleyford. There is a county park along California Creek in the lower, valley portion of Valleyford. Other structures include a church, storage facilities, houses and a number of abandoned buildings.

Nearby communities include Mica a few miles to the northeast up California Creek, and Freeman, a few miles to the southeast where a market and the region's schools are located.

Valleyford is located adjacent to the junction of three ecoregions as defined by the World Wildlife Fund, giving the area traits from all three. The Okanagan dry forests ecoregion's southeasternmost reach is just beyond Valleyford, and stretches northwest through Spokane, the Okanagan, and into the Thompson Plateau of British Columbia. Tall ponderosa pine trees are a remnant of the nature of the ecoregion prior to development of the community and agriculture. In the immediate vicinity of Valleyford, the Okanagan dry forests transition into the rolling, grassy hills of Palouse grasslands ecoregion to the south. The Palouse grasslands and Okanagan dry forests transition into the North Central Rockies forests as the land climbs up the slopes of the Selkirk Mountains to the east just beyond State Route 27.

== Gallery ==
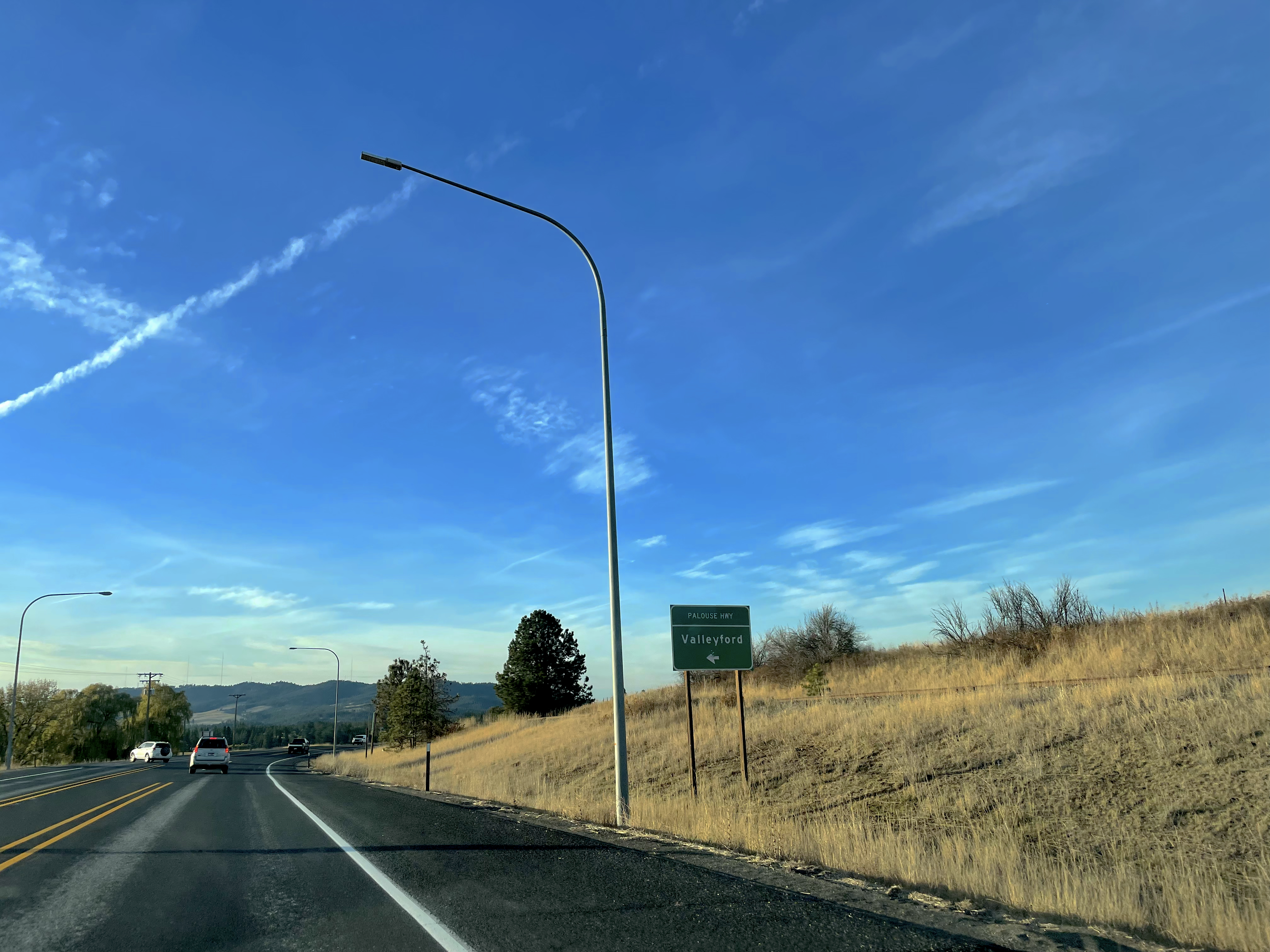
Exit to Valleyford from Washington State Route 27 with the TV towers on Krell Hill visible in the background.

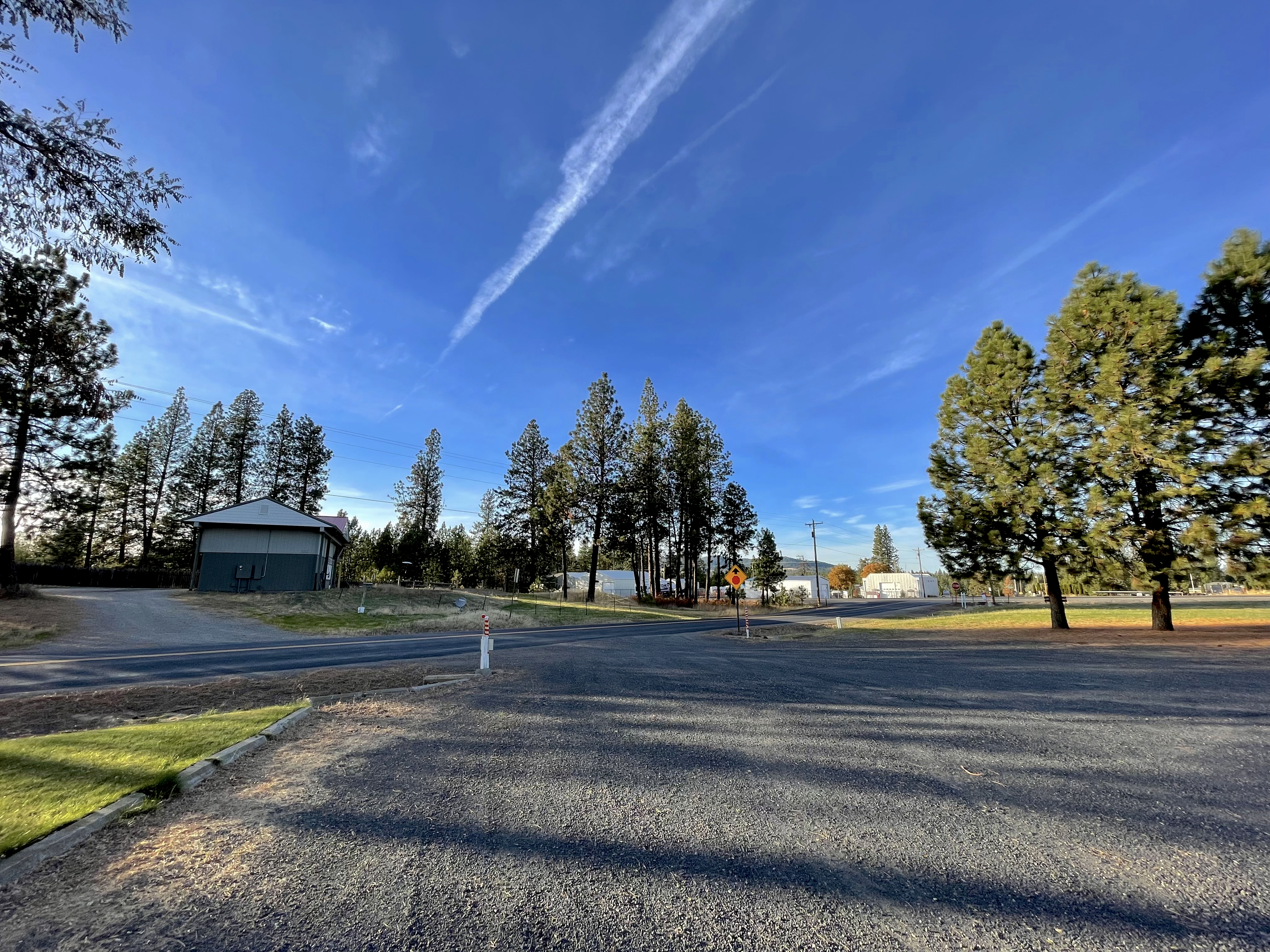
Looking towards the main intersection in Valleyford where Madison Road, foreground, meets the Palouse Highway.

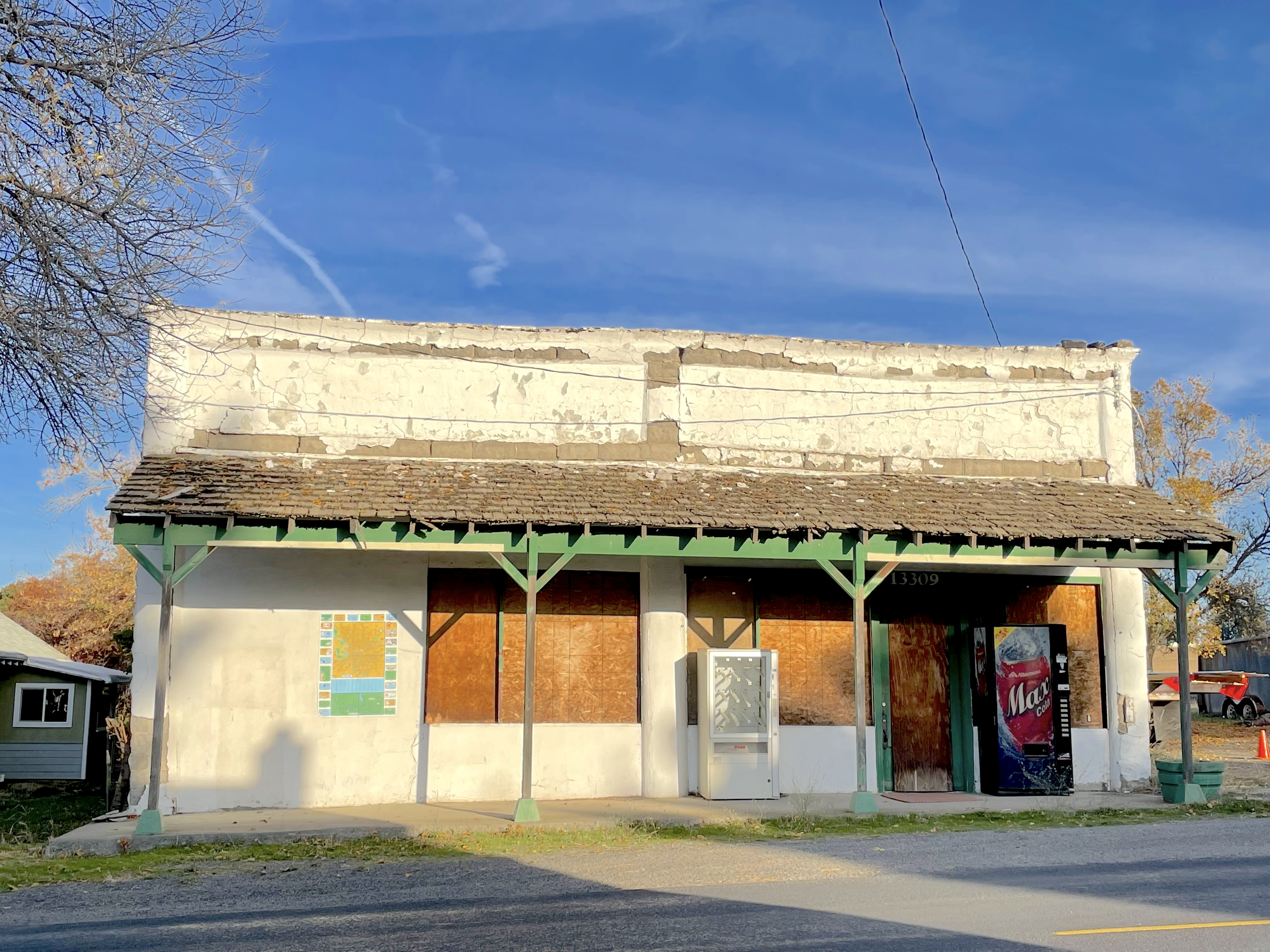
An abandoned market near the center of Valleyford.
