= Roy Schmidt =

Roy Schmidt may refer to:

- Roy Schmidt (American football), American football offensive lineman
- Roy Schmidt (politician), Republican member of the Michigan House of Representatives
- Roy Schmidt (sprinter), German track and field athlete
