= Grand Rapids Community College =

Public college in Grand Rapids, Michigan, US

Coordinates: 42.9665°N 85.6666°W

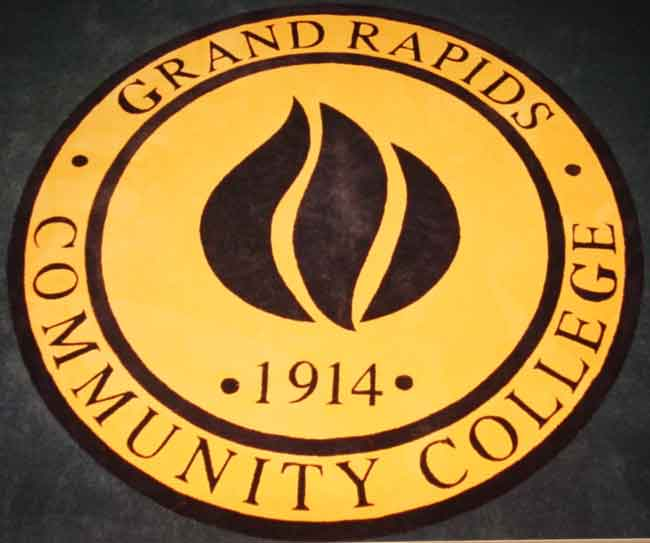
- Type: Public community college
- Established: 1914
- President: Dr. Kathryn A. Rogalski
- Students: 15,767
- Location: Grand Rapids, Michigan, United States
- Campus: Main Campus, Grand Rapids GRCC Lakeshore Campus, Holland
- Colors: Maize and blue
- Nickname: GRCC Raiders
- Mascot: The River Raider
- Website: www.grcc.edu

Grand Rapids Community College (GRCC) is a public community college in Grand Rapids, Michigan.

== History ==
Grand Rapids Junior College was established on September 21, 1914, after University of Michigan faculty passed a resolution encouraging the establishment of junior colleges in Michigan. Grand Rapids Junior College was the first junior college in Michigan. The college operated out of Central High School until 1924. The course offerings, based on University of Michigan offerings, were mathematics, history, rhetoric and composition, German, Latin, biology, and physics. All of them were focused on college transfer. The college's first graduating class numbered 49 students, who paid $60 per year for tuition. The following year, tuition was reduced to $40 per year for Grand Rapids residents and $50 for nonresidents to encourage enrollment. In 1918 Grand Rapids Junior College received its initial accreditation from the North Central Association of Colleges and Secondary Schools.

In 1944, the college acquired the Main Building from Grand Rapids Public Schools. Grand Rapids Public Schools Superintendent Arthur W. Krause closed Davis Technical High School to save costs and gave the building to Grand Rapids Junior College. The Main Building was renamed the Raleigh J. Finkelstein Hall in March 2019.

In 1990, Grand Rapids residents voted to separate the Junior College from the public school system and in 1991 GRJC became Grand Rapids Community College.

== Campuses ==
Grand Rapids Community College has several campuses located throughout West Michigan.

GRCC's main Campus is located in Grand Rapids, Michigan. GRCC's downtown learning spaces include a Main Campus and DeVos Campus. These campuses are located adjacent to Grand Rapids Medical Mile and Heritage Hill Historic District.

Due to its location in downtown Grand Rapids, GRCC is close to local festivals and art shows such as ArtPrize and Festival of the Arts.

In addition to the main campus, Grand Rapids Community College has the GRCC Lakeshore Campus in Holland, Michigan at 12335 James St, Holland, located in the Shops at West Shore, and the Leslie Tassell MTEC, which houses career training programs. The Phyllis Fratzke Early Childhood Learning Laboratory houses daycare and early childhood programs.

== Facilities ==
GRCC's 11-block downtown campus includes several classroom buildings, including the historic Raleigh J. Finkelstein Hall, the Library and Learning Resource Center, Spectrum Theater, the Wisner-Bottrall Applied Technology Center, the Alfred P. Smith Music Building, the Gerald R. Ford Fieldhouse with a natatorium, the Student Center, and the Calkins Science Center, and the Cook Academic Building, which includes many of the college's health careers programs. The Wisner-Bottrall Applied Technology Center includes The Heritage Restaurant, Fountain Hill Brewery, and the Secchia Piazza, all part of the college's Secchia Institute for Culinary Education. College Park Plaza includes faculty offices and the Communications Department. The Juan R. Olivarez Student Plaza was named after the former president—the first Hispanic college president in Michigan—and includes a lion head fountain and veterans memorial. The DeVos Campus, located at 415 Fulton Street E. includes the Administration Building, Stewart White Hall, Sneden Hall, Steven C. Ender Hall and the Custer Alumni House.

== Athletics ==
Grand Rapids Community College's athletic teams compete as the Raiders in men's baseball, basketball, golf, and cross country, and in women's basketball, softball, cross country, and volleyball. A men's and women's soccer program is scheduled to start in fall 2023. The college's teams participate in Michigan Community College Athletic Association (MCCAA) competition. The school has won 70 MCCAA titles and been awarded the MCCAA All-sports Trophy 16 times.

GRCC is a member of the National Junior College Athletic Association (NJCAA) and has won numerous NJCAA district and regional championships and has appeared in national tournaments several times. The baseball team has won five NJCAA tournaments and the school has been national runner-up five times in five different sports. In addition, the Raiders' football team was honored by the NJCAA as the non-scholarship team national champion in 2005 and 2009, has played in national championship games in 1956, 1988, and 2005, and has played in 10 other bowl games.

Former GRCC sports include men's cross country, swimming and diving, track and field, tennis, and wrestling, and women's swimming and diving and tennis. GRCC discontinued its football team in January 2012.

== Notable alumni ==
- Garrett Børns – Musician
- Russell Christopher – Metropolitan Opera baritone singer
- Ed Cole – automotive executive for General Motors
- Edward Fenlon – Michigan Representative
- Lawrence J. Fuller – U.S. Army major general and deputy director of the Defense Intelligence Agency
- Arnold Gingrich – co-founder of Esquire magazine
- John A. Hannah – president of Michigan State University and head of the United States Agency for International Development
- Scott S. Haraburda – U.S. Army colonel and president of the Indiana Society of Professional Engineers
- Bill Hardiman – Michigan Senator
- David Robert Mullen - Award-winning artist and photographer
- Steve Pestka - Michigan Representative
- Dave Rozema - Major League Baseball pitcher
- Michael Sak - Michigan Representative
- Sekou Smith — Award-winning sports journalist, NBA analyst
- K. William Stinson - U.S. Representative
- Rodney Vaccaro – Emmy award-winning screenwriter
- Daniel Vosovic – Fashion designer and contestant on Project Runway
- Elizabeth Wilson – Tony award-winning actress
- Lumen Martin Winter – American muralist, sculptor, painter and mosaic artist
