= David Mullen =

David Mullen may refer to:

- David Robert Mullen (born 1952), artist and photographer
- David Mullen (singer) (born 1964), Christian singer and producer
- M. David Mullen (born 1962), cinematographer
- David B. Mullen (1885–1940), member of the Legislative Assembly of Alberta
