= Michael Sak =

American politician

The Honorable Michael G. Sak

Member of the Michigan House of Representatives from the 76th district
- In office January 1, 2003 – December 31, 2008
- Preceded by: Steve Pestka
- Succeeded by: Roy Schmidt

Member of the Kent County Board of Commissioners
- In office 1987–2002

Personal details
- Born: October 20, 1959 (age 66)
- Party: Democratic
- Education: Grand Valley State University (M.A.); Utah State University (B.S.)

Michael G. Sak (born 1959) was a politician from the U.S. state of Michigan. He was a member of the Michigan State House of Representatives, representing the 76th district, located in urban Grand Rapids. He is a Democrat and was Speaker pro Tempore of the Michigan House.

In 2008 he was unable to run for re-election due to term limits and was replaced by Roy Schmidt.

== Early life ==
Sak received his Diploma from Grand Rapids Union High School in 1977, his Bachelor of Fine Arts degree from Utah State University in 1982 and his Masters of Education degree from Grand Valley State University 13 years later.

He taught elementary school in Grand Rapids from 1992 to 1998. In 1998 he became an administrator in the Grand Rapids Public Schools as Coordinator of the Shared Time program. From 1999 to 2003, he served as the Eisenhower Grant Coordinator and an Assistant Principal at the Math Science Academy in Grand Rapids.

== Political career ==
In 1986, Sak was elected to the Kent County Board of Commissioners, and served until 2002. He was elected to the Michigan House of Representatives in 2002. He represents the 76th district, which is located in Kent County and encompasses the northwest, northeast and southeast portions of the City of Grand Rapids. It is the only strongly Democratic district in all of Kent County.

In 2004, Sak was elected to become the Democratic Assistant Floor Leader.

In 2006, Democrats won the majority in the Michigan State House, and Sak was subsequently elected to be the Speaker pro Tempore.

In 2007, "Sak allegedly tried to use his position on the House Appropriations Committee to get a ride from a state trooper after a gathering of the National Governors Association on July 20 in Traverse City, the trooper wrote in a memo. Sak told the trooper, who was assigned to work security at the Grand Traverse Resort, that he owed him a ride because, as a member of appropriations, he had saved his job from being eliminated in budget cuts, the trooper wrote". https://www.mlive.com/grpress/2007/08/sak_tells_different_story_abou.html

== Electoral history ==
- 2006 campaign for State House
  - Michael Sak (D), 73%
  - Ted Liberski (R), 25%
- 2004 campaign for State House
  - Michael Sak (D), 67%
  - Holly Zuidema (R), 30%
- 2002 campaign for State House
  - Michael Sak (D), 61%
  - Mark Kublik (R), 37%
