= Winnie Brinks =

American politician (born 1968)

Lieutenant Governor-elect of Michigan
- Assuming office January 1, 2027
- Governor: Jocelyn Benson (elect)
- Succeeding: Garlin Gilchrist

Majority Leader of the Michigan Senate
- Incumbent
- Assumed office January 1, 2023
- Preceded by: Mike Shirkey

Member of the Michigan Senate from the 29th district
- Incumbent
- Assumed office January 1, 2019
- Preceded by: Dave Hildenbrand

Member of the Michigan House of Representatives from the 76th district
- In office January 1, 2013 – December 31, 2018
- Preceded by: Roy Schmidt
- Succeeded by: Rachel Hood

Personal details
- Born: Winnie Theresa De Vries; February 17, 1968 (age 58) Mount Vernon, Washington, U.S.
- Party: Democratic
- Spouse: Steve Brinks (m. 1992)
- Children: 3
- Education: Calvin College (BA)
- Website: Campaign website

Winnie Theresa Brinks (née De Vries; February 17, 1968) is an American politician and the lieutenant-governor-elect of Michigan. A member of the Democratic Party, since 2013 Brinks has served as a state representative and state senator, becoming majority leader of the Michigan Senate in 2023; she is the first woman to hold the office, and the first Democrat to do so since William Faust left office in 1984. Brinks previously worked as an executive at a non-profit. In the House, she served on the Workforce and Talent Development, Education, Health Policy, and Tourism and Outdoor Recreation Committees. She also serves as chair of the Progressive Women's Caucus, a non-profit organization that addresses concerns about women's health, pay equity, economic security and gender violence.

== Education and early career ==
Brinks earned a bachelor's degree in Spanish from Calvin College. For several years she was Executive Director of One Way House Inc., a residential facility for non-violent female offenders. She worked as a caseworker at The Source, an employee support organization.

== Political career ==
Brinks was recruited to run for office after Roy Schmidt, who had previously been elected to the Michigan House as a Democrat, switched to the Republican Party at the deadline to file for re-election, leaving no legitimate Democratic candidate on the primary ballot. Brinks campaigned in the primary as a write-in candidate, exceeding the 1,000 votes required to win the Democratic nomination. She then defeated Schmidt in the November general election. In 2014, she was re-elected, defeating Republican challenger Donijo DeJonge, and in 2016 she defeated Republican challenger Casey J. O'Neill.

Due to term limits, Brinks was unable to run for re-election in 2018, and instead ran successfully for the 29th district of the Michigan Senate. Brinks defeated fellow state representative Chris Afendoulis, a Republican, and Libertarian and Working Class Party candidates. She succeeded Dave Hildenbrand, also a Republican, who was required by term limits to vacate the seat. Upon taking office, she became the whip of the Democratic caucus, a leadership role she held through 2022.

Following the 2022 Michigan Senate election, in which she defeated challenger Tommy Brann, and the Democratic Party won control of the State Senate, Brinks was chosen as the majority leader of the Michigan Senate Democrats. Brinks is the first female majority leader of the State Senate.

In August 2026, Brinks was selected by Democratic gubernatorial nominee Jocelyn Benson as her running mate, and she was elected lieutenant governor that November. Brinks and Benson were the first all-female gubernatorial ticket in Michigan.

Position	Election Year	Votes	Opponent's votes	Opponent
State Representative	2012	23,530	12,337	Roy Schmidt
State Representative	2014	15,804	13,822	Donijo DeJonge
State Representative	2016	27,046	18,473	Casey J. O'Neill
State Senator	2018	70,715	50,225	Chris Afendoulis
State Senator	2022	59,407	39,115	Tommy Brann

== Political positions ==
As Senate majority leader, Brinks voted for the repeal of Michigan's right-to-work law, stating: "We've talked a lot about bringing good job creators here to our state. But we haven't talked nearly enough about how we’re going to attract and keep workers and their families." In 2023, Brinks voted to expand the Elliott-Larsen Civil Rights Act to prohibit discrimination on the basis of sexual orientation and gender identity continuing a long history of support for the LGBTQIA+ community. In 2025, when the Michigan House passed a resolution calling for Michigan High School Athletic Association to ban transgender girls from girls' sports, Brinks stated of the Democratic-controlled Senate: "We will not be attacking kids. We will not be taking this up."

== Personal life ==
Brinks is third cousins, twice removed, of Pete Hoekstra. She married Steve Brinks in 1992.

Michigan Senate
Preceded by Mike Shirkey	Majority Leader of the Michigan Senate; 2023–present	Incumbent
Party political offices
Preceded by Garlin Gilchrist	Democratic nominee for Lieutenant Governor of Michigan; 2026	Most recent
Political offices
Preceded by Garlin Gilchrist	Lieutenant Governor of Michigan; Taking office 2027	Elect
