= Steve Pestka =

American politician (born 1951)

Member of the Michigan House of Representatives from the 76th district
- In office 1999–2003
- Succeeded by: Michael Sak

Personal details
- Born: October 5, 1951 (age 74) Grand Rapids, Michigan, U.S.
- Party: Democratic
- Education: University of Michigan (BA); Michigan State University (JD)

Steven Pestka (born October 5, 1951) is an American politician, attorney and businessman. Pestka served as a member of the Michigan House of Representatives, judge, and a Kent County commissioner. He was the Democratic Party nominee for the United States House of Representatives 2012 election to represent Michigan's 3rd congressional district, which he lost to Justin Amash.

== Early life and education ==
Pestka's father, Henry, survived the Holocaust. After World War II, Henry relocated to Grand Rapids, Michigan, where he started a real estate business.

Pestka graduated from East Grand Rapids High School. He then attended Grand Rapids Community College and graduated from the University of Michigan. Pestka received his Juris Doctor degree from the Michigan State University College of Law.

== Career ==
After law school, Pestka became Assistant Prosecuting Attorney for Kent County, Michigan. He became a member of the Kent County Board of Commissioners in 1992 and served three terms. In 1998, Pestka was elected to the Michigan House of Representatives, where he served two terms. In 2002, Pestka ran against Bill Hardiman for election to the Michigan Senate rather than seek reelection to the Michigan House. Pestka lost the election 53.8–44.7%.

Jennifer Granholm, the Governor of Michigan, appointed Pestka to the Family Court in the Kent County Circuit Court in 2003. He was elected to a six-year term in 2004. However, he resigned as judge in 2009 to help run his father's real estate business.

Pestka ran for the Democratic Party nomination for the United States House of Representatives election to represent Michigan's 3rd congressional district. He lost to Republican (subsequently Independent and then Libertarian) Justin Amash.

== Personal ==
Pestka and his wife, Alicia, have one son. They reside in Ada, Michigan.
