= Daniel Johnson (Michigan politician) =

American politician

Member of the Michigan Senate from the 29th district
- In office January 5, 1853 – December 31, 1854
- Succeeded by: Henry J. Alvord

Personal details
- Born: 1821 Haverstraw, New York
- Died: August 6, 1860 (aged 38–39)

Daniel S. Johnson (1821 – August 6, 1860) was a Michigan politician.

== Early life ==
Johnson was born in 1821 in Haverstraw, New York, United States.

== Career ==
Johnson was a ship lumber dealer in New York City. In 1846, Johnson moved to Michigan with his brother Solomon. From 1847 to 1858, Johnson was the leading lumberman in Saginaw Valley. In 1848, the brothers settled land on the Saginaw River and constructed a sawmill there. They named their settlement "Zilwaukie" as a way to attract confused settlers in search of Milwaukee. On November 2, 1852, Johnson was elected to the Michigan Senate, where he represented the 29th district from January 5, 1853 to December 31, 1854. On January 20, 1854, Zilwaukee was organized into a township, and on that day, the first township elections were held in Daniel and Solomon's office. Johnson was elected as one of the first justices of the peace for the township, alongside B. F. Fisher, William H. Marsh, and Casper Schulteis. The Johnson Brothers attempted to found a bank, the Bank of Zilwaukee, and while currency was printed for the bank, it failed in 1858. The currency was never circulated.

== Personal life ==
Johnson was married.

== Death ==
Johnson died on August 6, 1860.
