= K. William Stinson =

American politician (1930–2002)

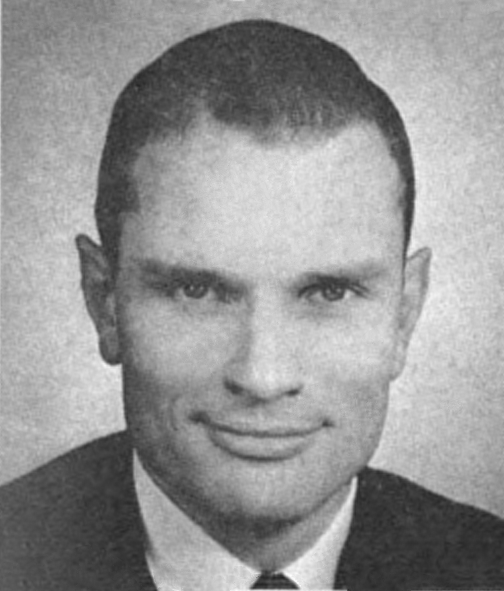

Member of the U.S. House of Representatives from Washington's 7th district
- In office January 3, 1963 – January 3, 1965
- Preceded by: Donald H. Magnuson
- Succeeded by: Brock Adams

Personal details
- Born: Kaye William Stinson; April 20, 1930 Grand Rapids, Michigan, U.S.
- Died: January 9, 2002 (aged 71) Cabo San Lucas, Mexico
- Resting place: Willamette National Cemetery, Portland, Oregon, U.S.
- Party: Republican
- Education: Grand Rapids Junior College (attended); University of Michigan (A.B.)
- Profession: Westinghouse executive, sporting goods store operator, author

Military service
- Allegiance: United States
- Branch/service: United States Navy
- Years of service: 1953–1956 (3 years, 5 months)
- Rank: Lieutenant, junior grade
- Battles/wars: Korean War

Kaye William "Bill" Stinson (April 20, 1930 – January 9, 2002) was a U.S. representative from Washington.

== Early life and education ==
Born in Grand Rapids, Michigan, Stinson attended the public schools and Grand Rapids Junior College for two years. He graduated in 1952 from the University of Michigan at Ann Arbor.

== Career ==
He entered the executive training program of Westinghouse Electric Company. He enlisted in the United States Navy in January 1953, attended Officers' Candidate School and served until June 1956. He was employed with Westinghouse Electric Corp. in Seattle, Washington from 1956 to 1959. He was also a manufacturer's representative in the marine and sporting goods industry from 1959 to 1962.

Stinson was elected as a Republican to the Eighty-eighth Congress (January 3, 1963 – January 3, 1965). He was an unsuccessful candidate for reelection in 1964 to the Eighty-ninth Congress. Stinson voted in favor of the Civil Rights Act of 1964.

== Later life and death ==
He was a resident of Battle Ground, Washington before his death on January 9, 2002. Stinson died while vacationing in Cabo San Lucas, Mexico with his wife and daughter.

U.S. House of Representatives
Preceded by Donald H. Magnuson	Member of the U.S. House of Representatives from Washington's 7th congressional district 1963–1965	Succeeded by Brock Adams
