= Dave Hildenbrand =

American politician (born 1973)

Member of the Michigan Senate from the 29th district
- In office January 1, 2011 – January 1, 2019
- Preceded by: Bill Hardiman
- Succeeded by: Winnie Brinks

Member of the Michigan House of Representatives from the 86th district
- In office January 1, 2005 – December 31, 2010
- Preceded by: James Koetje
- Succeeded by: Lisa Lyons

Personal details
- Born: November 15, 1973 (age 52) Grand Rapids, Michigan, U.S.
- Party: Republican
- Spouse: Sarah

Dave Hildenbrand (born November 15, 1973) is an American former politician from the U.S. state of Michigan. He was a Republican member of the Michigan Senate, representing the 29th district and serving as Assistant Majority Leader. Prior to that, he was a member of the Michigan House of Representatives.

== Biography ==
=== Early life and education ===
Hildenbrand was born in Grand Rapids, Michigan, and graduated from Lowell High School. He earned a Bachelor of Science degree in public resource management from Michigan State University.

=== Career ===
In 2004, he was elected to the Michigan House of Representatives, representing district 86, and was re-elected twice. He was elected to the Michigan Senate in 2010, serving through 2018, when he was required to retire by term limits. He subsequently joined the Kelley Cawthorne lobbying firm.
