= Most Worshipful Prince Hall Grand Lodge of Michigan =

- U.S. National Register of Historic Places
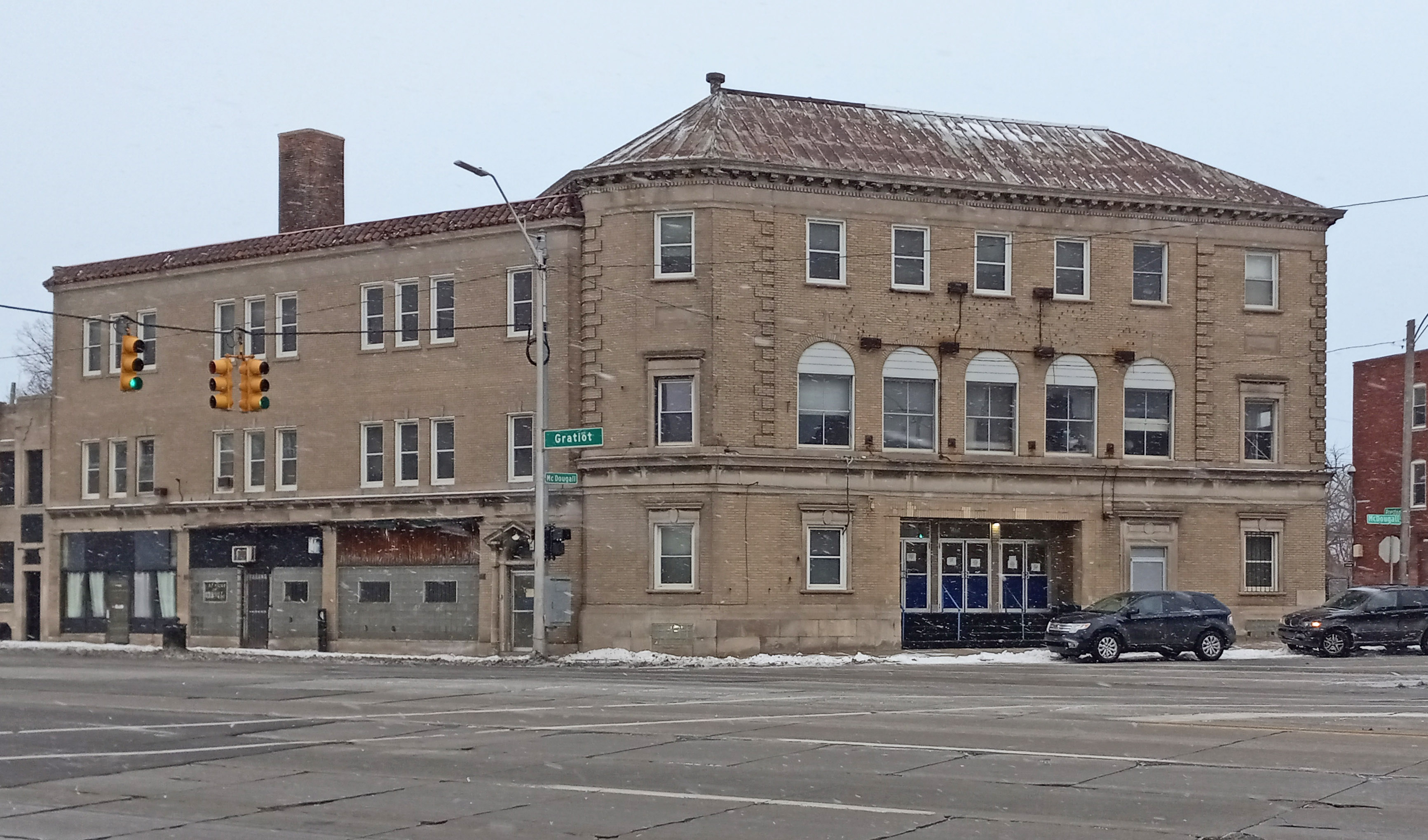
- Interactive map
- Location: 3500 McDougall St. Detroit, Michigan, United States
- Coordinates: 42°21′26″N 83°1′43″W
- Built: 1924
- Architect: Bernard C. Wetzel
- Architectural style: Neoclassical
- MPS: The Civil Rights Movement and the African American Experience in 20th Century Detroit MPS
- NRHP reference No.: 100007344
- Added to NRHP: January 19, 2022

The Most Worshipful Prince Hall Grand Lodge of Michigan is a Prince Hall Freemason lodge located at 3500 McDougall Street in Detroit, Michigan. The building was listed on the National Register of Historic Places in 2021.

== History ==
The building that now houses the Prince Hall Grand Lodge was commissioned 1920 for the Order of the Amaranth of Wayne County. The Order hired Detroit architect Bernard C. Wetzel to design the building; construction was completed in 1924. As originally built, the building had a three-story temple facing McDougall and aa attached two-story commercial structure facing Gratiot. The commercial portion of the building was demolished in 1930 when Gratiot was widened; it was replaced in 1931 with the current three-story commercial building, which incorporates many of the design elements of the earlier structure. The Order of the Amaranth used the building until 1949, when they merged with a similar organization in Port Huron.

In 1951, the Prince Hall Grand Lodge of Michigan purchased the building for $205,000. The Prince Hall Grand Lodge of Michigan was organized in 1865, and by 1872 there were 14 Prince Hall lodges operating in Michigan, three of which were in Detroit. Bu 1925, this had increased to 23 lodges, five of which were in Detroit. The Grand Lodge of Michigan appears to have met at 535 Frederick Street during this time; in 1943 the Prince Hall Masons of Detroit purchased a building at 275 East Ferry Street, in what is now the East Ferry Avenue Historic District, to use as a meeting hall. The move to the Gratiot Avenue building, though, reflected the sophistication of black freemasonry at the time. The Prince Hall Grand Lodge has remained in the building into the 21st century.

== Description ==
The Prince Hall Grand Lodge is a rectangular three-story Neoclassical buff-colored brick building. The facade faces McDougall Street, and abuts against a three-story store and office building addition that follows the diagonal of Gratiot Avenue. The building sits on a smooth coursed ashlar basement, which is partially raised and contains a fourth basement story. The building is topped with a low-pitched flat deck hip roof clad in tin. The facade's first story contains a central recessed entrance containing three sets of double doors. Flanking the central entrance are two bays on each side. On the second floor are five arch-topped windows.

The interior of the structure contains a large assembly hall with stage and balcony, an attached kitchen, two lodge rooms, additional club rooms and offices, and a basement containing a bowling alley.
