= Bill Hardiman =

American politician

The Honorable Bill Hardiman

Member of the Michigan Senate from the 29th district
- In office January 1, 2003 – December 31, 2010
- Preceded by: Robert L. Emerson
- Succeeded by: Dave Hildenbrand

Mayor of Kentwood
- In office 1999–2002
- Preceded by: Gerald DeRuiter
- Succeeded by: Richard Root

Personal details
- Born: William Clyde Hardiman III
- Party: Republican
- Spouse: Clova
- Education: Western Michigan University; Grand Valley State University; Grand Rapids Community College

Military service
- Branch/service: United States Army
- Rank: Specialist 5
- Unit: Americal Division
- Battles/wars: Vietnam War

William Clyde Hardiman III is an American Republican politician from Michigan. He was the mayor of Kentwood, Michigan from 1992 to 2002. He then ran for Michigan state senate in 2002 in the 29th district, defeating Steve Pestka, and served from 2003 to 2011, when he retired due to term limits. He ran unsuccessfully for Congress in Michigan's 3rd congressional district. In June 2011 he joined the Michigan Department of Human Services, where he focuses on services for veterans.

Hardiman is a veteran himself, having served in the United States Army in Vietnam during the Vietnam War as a medic in an artillery unit from 1967 to 1968. He also served with the Americal Division and became a Specialist 5.

He has an associate degree from Grand Rapids Community College, a bachelor's degree from Grand Valley State University, and a master's degree in public affairs from Western Michigan University.
