= Clarence Boggie =

American lumberjack (1893–1949)

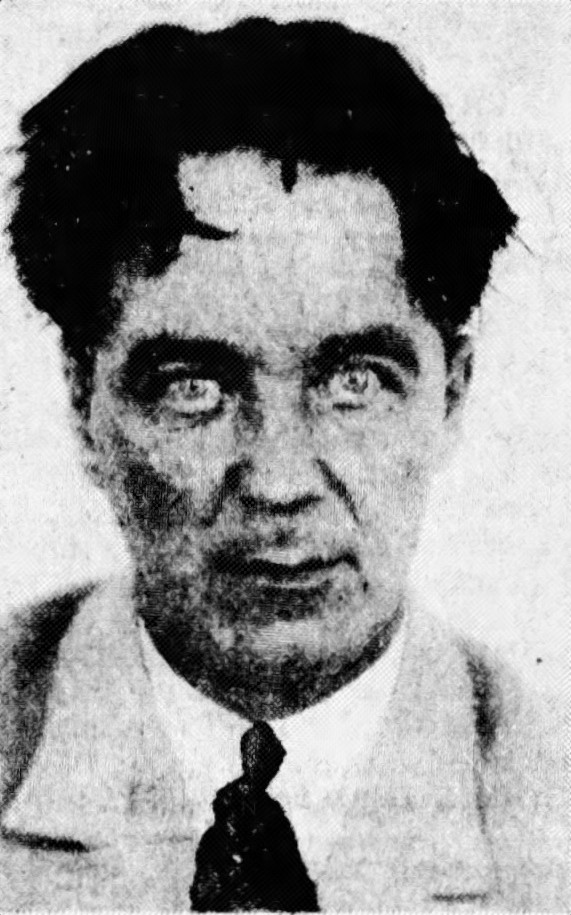
- Boggie in 1934
- Born: 1893; Wisconsin, U.S.
- Died: July 1, 1949 (aged 55–56); Northern California, U.S.
- Occupation: Lumberjack
- Known for: Wrongful conviction for the murder of Moritz Peterson and later pardoned

Clarence Gilmore Boggie (1893 – July 1, 1949) was an American lumberjack who was known for his wrongful convictions and later pardons. Born in Wisconsin and raised in Washington, Boggie worked in the logging industry throughout his life.

In the early 1930s, he was convicted of two robberies in Oregon and Idaho, for which he was later pardoned after investigations revealed his innocence. In 1933, he was wrongfully convicted of the murder of Moritz Peterson, a crime he did not commit. After serving 13 years in prison, new evidence led to a conditional pardon from the governor of Washington in 1948. He died from a heart attack in July 1949.

== Early life ==
Clarence Boggie was born in Wisconsin in 1893. During his youth, he and his parents migrated to the state of Washington, where they settled near Brownsville. When Boggie turned seventeen, he began working in logging fields. He married twice, once from 1915 until his wife died in 1921, and again from 1931 to May 1933.

During the Great Depression, Boggie was unemployed and lived in Portland. He had previously been convicted twice for robbery prior to the murder, in Oregon and Idaho respectively, although he was pardoned both times after an investigation.

== Death of Moritz Petterson and murder trial ==
On June 28, 1933, 79-year-old saloon operator Moritz Peterson was found dead in his home due to a robbery. In 1935, Boggie was put on trial for the murder of Peterson. He testified that he could not have committed the murder as he was in Portland at that time. Although he did not fit the description of the murderer, several witnesses testified against him, causing the jury to convict him of first-degree murder. They chose to not give him the death penalty, sentencing him to life in prison instead.

== New evidence and eventual pardon ==
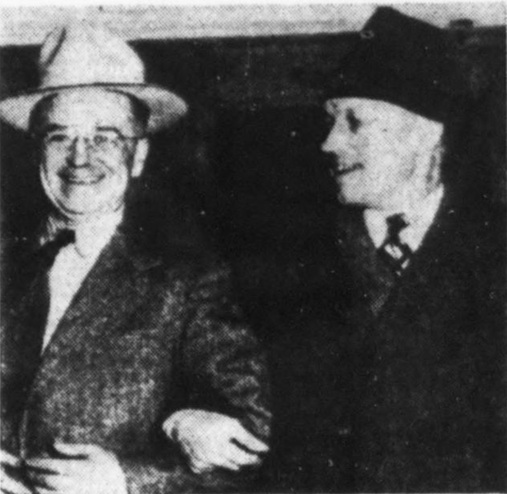
Boggie (left) leaving prison with Magnuson

William Gilbert, a clergyman at St. Paul's Episcopal Church in Walla Walla who was interested in the case, traveled to California to convince the lawyer Erle Stanley Gardner to see if Boggie was innocent. Additionally, in October 1947, reporter Don Magnuson was sent by The Seattle Times to investigate the trial of Boggie. Magnuson travelled thousands of miles, gathering evidence while interviewing officials, attorneys, witnesses, and jurors. Additionally, Gardner discovered that an unnamed "Convict X", who had previously framed Boggie, was the likely killer.

The new evidence provided by Gardner and Magnuson prompted then-Attorney General of Washington Smith Troy to conduct a new investigation. On September 23, Troy concluded the investigation, recommending that Governor Monrad Wallgren pardon Boggie. Despite that, Spokane officials chose not to pursue the suspected killer. Wallgren eventually granted Boggie a conditional pardon on December 23, 1948.

== Later life and death ==
After he was released, the state of Oregon chose not to send Boggie back to prison for the robbery charge as it expired in 1934. He married Gertrude McKean, a childhood friend, on March 19, 1949. Clarence Boggie died on July 1, 1949, from a heart attack while working at a logging camp in Northern California. It was speculated that his heart was strained and weakened by his time in prison.
