= Bernard C. Wetzel =

American architect (1876–1952)

Bernard Christian Wetzel
- Born: March 18, 1876; Zilwaukee, Michigan, United States
- Died: July 12, 1952 (aged 76); Detroit, Michigan, United States
- Other name: B.C. Wetzel
- Occupations: Architect, carpenter
- Notable work: Most Worshipful Prince Hall Grand Lodge of Michigan (1924)
- Spouse(s): Mary Winters (m. 1901–1917; divorce); Mabel Curtis (m. 1935–1952; death)

Bernard Christian Wetzel (March 18, 1876 – July 12, 1952), was an American architect in Detroit, Michigan. He worked at various firms before establishing his own in 1907, B. C. Wetzel Company. He designed several buildings listed on the National Register of Historic Places.

== Early life and family ==
Wetzel was born on March 18, 1876, in Zilwaukee, Michigan. His parents immigrated from Germany. He was Lutheran. Wetzel attended public schools in Saginaw, Michigan.

In 1901, he was married to Mary Winters; which ended in divorce in 1917. In 1935, he married Mabel Curtis.

== Career ==
He trained for four years as a carpenter in northern Michigan and in Detroit. Wetzel started his architectural career in 1895 in Detroit, attending an educational program.

By 1907, he had started his own architectural firm, B. C. Wetzel Company. He had an office in the Dime Bank Building in Detroit, and an earlier office at the 404–405 Hammond Building. He was a prominent architect in the city of Detroit.

Wetzel belonged to the Board of Commerce of Detroit, Michigan Society of Architects, Ashlar Masonic Lodge, and Detroit Society of Architects.

He died after a long illness on July 12, 1952, in Detroit. Wetzel was survived by his wife Mabel.

== List of work ==
- Coughlin Building (1909), Detroit, Michigan; a store
- Ralph Phelps Building (1910) at Michigan Avenue and First Street
- Samaritan Hospital (1912), Detroit, Michigan
- George V. N. Lothrop Detroit Public Library branch (1912) at Warner Avenue and Grand Boulevard, Detroit, Michigan; a Carnegie library.
- Daniel T. Crowley House (1915) at 243 Lakeland Street, Grosse Pointe, Michigan.
- Deluxe Theatre (1916–1918), 9355 Kercheval, Indian Village, Detroit, Michigan
- Most Worshipful Prince Hall Grand Lodge of Michigan (1924), 3500 McDougall Street, Detroit, Michigan; NRHP-listed
- Gesu Catholic High School (1924–1925), Detroit, Michigan
- Andrew Jackson Intermediate School (1928; later known as Ronald McNair Middle School), Detroit, Michigan
- Historic Trinity Lutheran Church parish house (1931), Detroit, Michigan; the church complex is NRHP-listed
- High school in Wyandotte, Michigan
- Joseph Crowley House in Grosse Pointe Park, Michigan; Crowley owned a namesake department store.
- Jacob Z. Danziger House at 1485 Burns, Detroit, Michigan
- Julius L. Knack House at 3426 Iroquois, Indian Village, Detroit, Michigan

== See also ==
- National Register of Historic Places listings in Detroit
