= Historic Trinity Lutheran Church =

Historic church in Michigan, United States

- Trinity Evangelical Lutheran Church Complex
- U.S. National Register of Historic Places
- Michigan State Historic Site
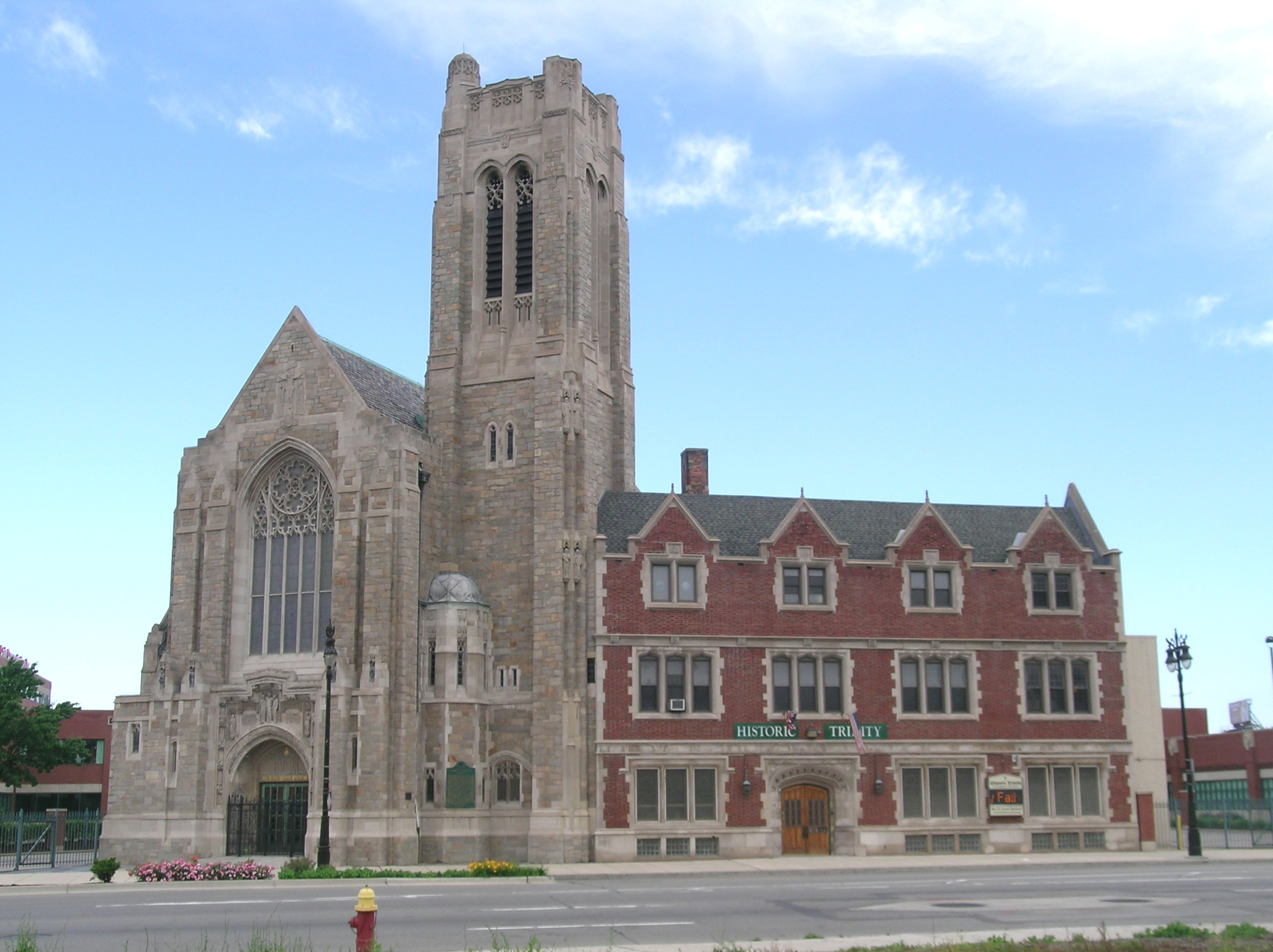

- Location within Michigan Location within the United States
- Interactive map
- Location: 1345 Gratiot Avenue; Detroit, Michigan, United States
- Coordinates: 42°20′34″N 83°2′23″W
- Built: 1927
- Architect: Bernard C. Wetzel, W. E. N. Hunter
- Architectural style: Gothic Revival, Tudor Revival
- NRHP reference No.: 83000897

Significant dates
- Added to NRHP: February 10, 1983
- Designated MSHS: April 24, 1981

The Historic Trinity Lutheran Church is a church located in downtown Detroit, Michigan. It occupies the Trinity Evangelical Lutheran Church complex, located at 1345 Gratiot Avenue. It was designated a Michigan State Historic Site in 1981 and listed on the National Register of Historic Places in 1983. Its current pastor is Rev. Darryl L. Andrzejewski.

== History ==
The Trinity congregation was formed in 1850, when members of St. Matthew's Lutheran Church, a German-speaking congregation, broke from the main body following the excommunication of another member. Services were first held in the chapel of Christ Episcopal Church, located at the corner of Jefferson and Hastings. Soon, the congregation bought the chapel of the Western Seaman's Friend Society of Woodbridge Street, and moved it to Rivard and Larned. This building quickly proved too small, so the congregation built a new brick church at Gratiot and Rivard in 1866. This area, surrounding Eastern Market, was at the time home to a large German population and a natural fit for Trinity.

Around this time, many schools, missions, and other congregations were begun by Trinity throughout the region. In total, 132 Lutheran parishes in south-east Michigan can be traced to Trinity.

In 1905, the congregation built a new school and social hall near the church. However, the community around Trinity soon changed as families left the downtown area, and the flow of new German immigrants stopped. Trinity began offering English services in addition to those in German.

In the late 1920s, Trinity began considering renovation of its 1866 structure. However, congregant Charles Gauss stepped forward and offered to finance the building of a new church. The old church was demolished, and the cornerstone of the current church was laid in 1929 with the dedication held on February 15, 1931.

After World War II, the population of downtown Detroit began moving in droves to the suburbs, and many Detroit churches, including Trinity, lost membership. However, then-pastor Gilbert Theodore Otte remained firm in keeping the church in the downtown area.

The city of Detroit recognized the 1931 church structure for its historical significance in 1979, as did the state of Michigan in 1982. It was placed on the National Register of Historic Places in 1983.

Membership, however, declined, with only 112 church members in 1981. In 1983, Rev. David Eberhard became pastor, a post he would hold until 2015, and instituted additional programs that tripled membership in five years. The church continues to be a gathering place for Detroit Lutherans, with over 2100 members in 2012. The parish operates under the Historic Trinity name and is a member of the Lutheran Church–Missouri Synod.
