= David Robert Mullen =

American artist and photographer

David Robert Mullen is an American artist and photographer. His art spans a wide range of styles from realist, to abstraction, to surrealist. David Mullen has practiced fine art photography for over 35 years. He views photography as a great printmaking art and has worked in black and white processes such as Van Dyke brown, platinum, silver gelatin and digital formats. For the last seventeen years, Mullen has dedicated his time to black and white and color photography as well as painting in water media such as watercolor, gouache, and acrylics. Mullen has won numerous awards for his work.

== Philosophical beliefs ==
Mullen has stated that he respects diverse spiritual and philosophical view points, believing they offer a way to maintain an open perspective on the world. His still-life photography of orchids and other flora aims to depict natural beauty.

David has deep feelings about what is going on in the world today and has a keen perspective on religious intolerance, racism, genocide, war and selfish excesses. His recent ArtPrize entry entitled, “Post Modern Dark Ages,” is a black and white triptych of images depicting war, ‘the haves and have-nots,’ and a host of environmental consequences. It is a dark and somewhat humorous commentary. These particular pieces depict controversial personages, both historical and contemporary and the artist's intent is to leave the viewer to contemplate the world we live in.

== Jury Selections and Awards ==
=== 2010 ===
Digital Prints, “San Miguel Good Friday 1”, “San Miguel Good Friday 2”, “Loretto Good Friday” and “Untitled” piece jury-selected for 2010 Festival of the Arts, Grand Rapids, Michigan. “San Miguel Good Friday 2” received the J. Russell Award for Photographic Excellence and “Loretto Good Friday” received the Bill Pieri Photography Award.

=== 2003-2005 ===
Jury-selected for the Ann Arbor, Michigan Art Fair and Ludington, Michigan Art Fair. Best of Show, Ludington Art Fair 2003

=== 2001 ===
Chromogenic prints, “Vanda” and “Vanda Mirror Pool,” jury-selected for 2001 Festival of the Arts, Grand Rapids, Michigan. Both received Purchase Awards

=== 1998 ===
Paintings, “Canonization” and “Three Pears” jury-selected for 1998 Festival of the Arts, Grand Rapids, Michigan. “Three Pears” received a Purchase Award

=== 1997 ===
Chromogenic print, “Tulips,” jury-selected for 1997 Festival of the Arts, Grand Rapids, Michigan. Winner of City of Grand Rapids Purchase Award

=== 1996 ===
Chromogenic floral, “Sunflower,” jury-selected for 1996 Festival of the Arts, Grand Rapids, Michigan

=== 1995 ===
Chromogenic floral still life jury-selected for 1995 Festival of the Arts, Grand Rapids, Michigan

=== 1994 ===
Chromogenic print, “Joshua Tree,” winner of Best Color Photography, 1994 Festival of the Arts, Grand Rapids, Michigan.

=== 1994 ===
Hand-colored oil on silver print, “The Climb,” jury-selected for Battle Creek Fine Arts Center exhibit, Battle Creek, Michigan

=== 1990-1993 ===
Silver prints jury-selected for Festival of the Arts ’90, ’91, ’92 and ‘93

=== 1992 ===
“The Climb,” Best of Show in county/regional photography exhibit at Grand Rapids Community College, Grand Rapids, Michigan

=== 1984 ===
“Ally 2,” silver print, selected Best of Show at 1984 Festival of the Arts, Grand Rapids, Michigan

== Exhibits ==
=== 2010 ===
September 22 – October 10 - ArtPrize - Juried triptych of digital photography entitled “Post Modern Dark Ages” displayed at Riverview Center Professional Building, Grand Rapids, Michigan

June – Four photography prints jury selected by Grand Rapids Festival of the Arts, Old Federal Building, Grand Rapids, Michigan

=== 2007-2009 ===
Studied digital photography and printmaking. Created portfolios of architectural, Oaxacan, landscapes, abstracts, surrealism and floral art

=== 2003-2005 ===
Exhibited at juried fine art fairs throughout Michigan

=== 2001 ===
July – Exhibit of chromogenic photography, “Orchid Portfolio,” Good Goods Gallery, Saugatuck, Michigan

June–July- Exhibit of chromogenic photography, Four Friends Coffeehouse, Grand Rapids, Michigan

=== 1999 ===
July- Exhibit of chromogenic photography in “Four Artists Celebrate the Fourth,” Good Goods Gallery, Saugatuck, Michigan

May–June – “A Dance of Color and Light,” solo show at Frederik Meijer Garden, exhibiting Chromogenic floral prints; Grand Rapids, Michigan

=== 1998 ===
June – Featured artist at Grand Rapids Art Museum Retail Gallery, Grand Rapids, Michigan

=== 1997 ===
October – Featured artist, Gallery Walk, Good Goods Gallery, Saugatuck, Michigan

October – November – Solo show at Frederick Meijer Garden, Grand Rapids, Michigan

=== 1996 ===
August – Three-person exhibit of fine art photography, Ten Weston Gallery, Grand Rapids, Michigan

April – May Chromogenic florals (the “blooms in Nudes, Blooms…and All That Jazz”), San Chez, Grand Rapids, Michigan

=== 1995 ===
October – November – Chromogenic florals and silver print still life studies in “Shooting from the Rapids” photography exhibit, LaClaire Fine Arts Gallery, Grand Rapids, Michigan

=== 1983 ===
Solo show of silver prints, “Not Exactly the Blues” Ryerson Gallery, Grand Rapids Public Library, Grand Rapids, Michigan

=== 1982 ===
Joint photography exhibit at Ryerson Gallery, Grand Rapids Public Library, Grand Rapids, Michigan

== Collections ==
Warner, Norcross & Judd Corporate Collection, Grand Rapids, Michigan

Haworth, Inc. Corporate Collection, Holland, Michigan

Grand Rapids Community College Science and Technology Center

Loyola University of Chicago, Illinois, Stritch School of Medicine

Private collection of Dieter Noga, Hamburg, Germany

Numerous private collections throughout the United States

== Publications ==
Article in Art Business News, “Trendsetters: Emerging Artists,” October 2001

Chromogenic floral, “Kind of Blue,” April 2001 cover of On The Town magazine, Grand Rapids, Michigan

Chromogenic floral, “Vulcan World,” August 1998 cover of On The Town magazine, Grand Rapids, Michigan

Chromogenic floral, “Gloxinia,” August 1996 cover of On The Town magazine, Grand Rapids, Michigan

== Education ==
Grand Rapids Community College and Grand Valley State University
