= Zilwaukee, Michigan =

- City
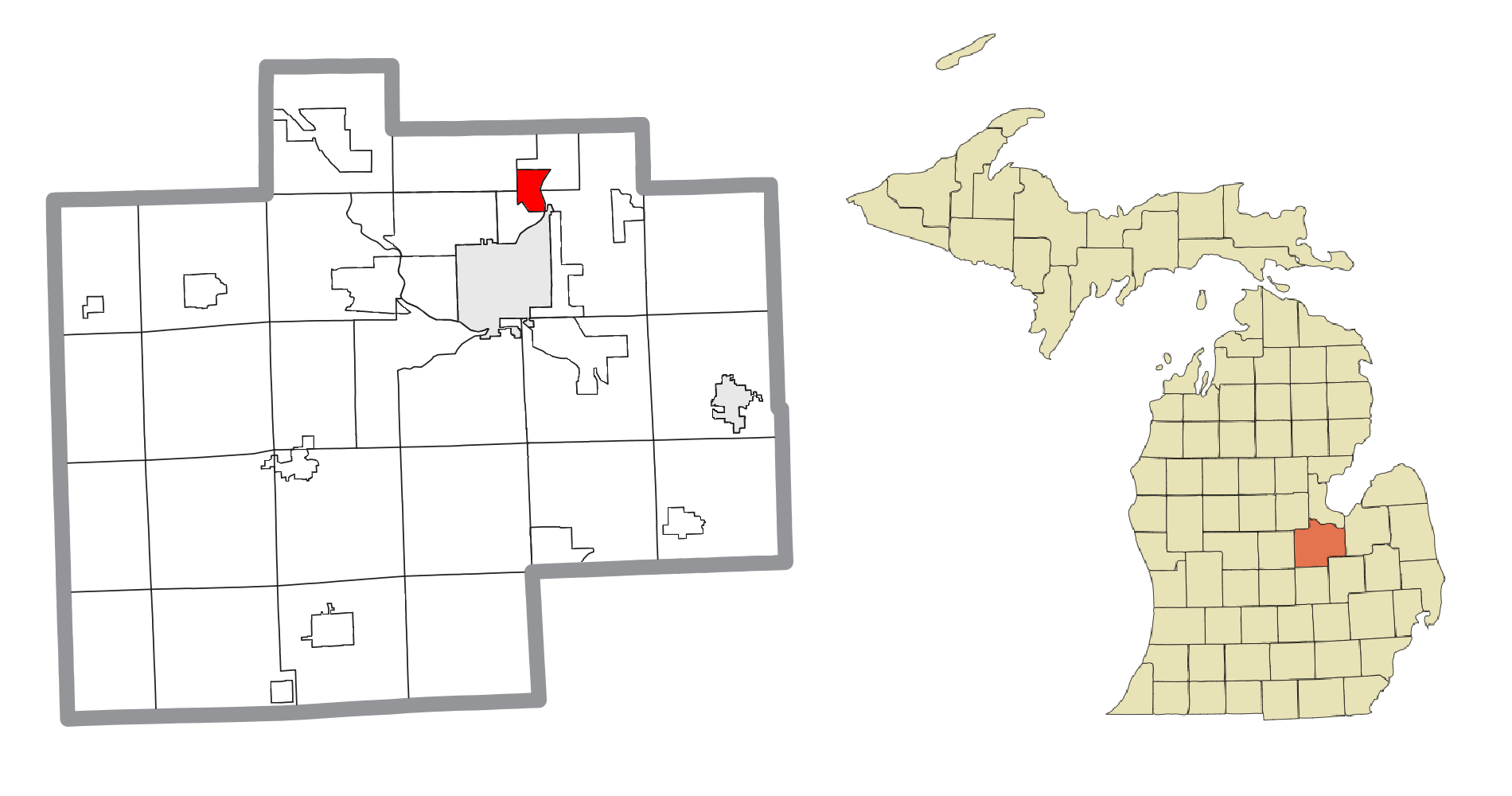
- Location within Saginaw County

- Location within the state of Michigan
- Coordinates: 43°28′35″N 83°55′14″W
- Country: United States
- State: Michigan
- County: Saginaw
- Founded: 1848

Government
  - Type: Council–manager
  - Mayor: Eugene Jolin

Area
  - Total: 2.37 sq mi (6.13 km^{2})
  - Land: 2.21 sq mi (5.73 km^{2})
  - Water: 0.15 sq mi (0.40 km^{2})
- Elevation: 584 ft (178 m)

Population (2020)
  - Total: 1,534
  - Density: 693.8/sq mi (267.89/km^{2})
- Time zone: UTC-5 (Eastern (EST))
  - Summer (DST): UTC-4 (EDT)
- ZIP codes: 48604 (Saginaw); 48724 (Carrollton)
- Area code: 989
- FIPS code: 26-89320
- GNIS feature ID: 1616929
- Website: Official website

Zilwaukee is a city in Saginaw County in the U.S. state of Michigan. The 2020 census places the population at 1,534. The city is adjacent to and was created from Zilwaukee Township. It is the home of the Zilwaukee Bridge.

== History ==
Zilwaukee was founded in 1848 when Daniel and Solomon Johnson, two brothers from New York City, built a saw mill there.

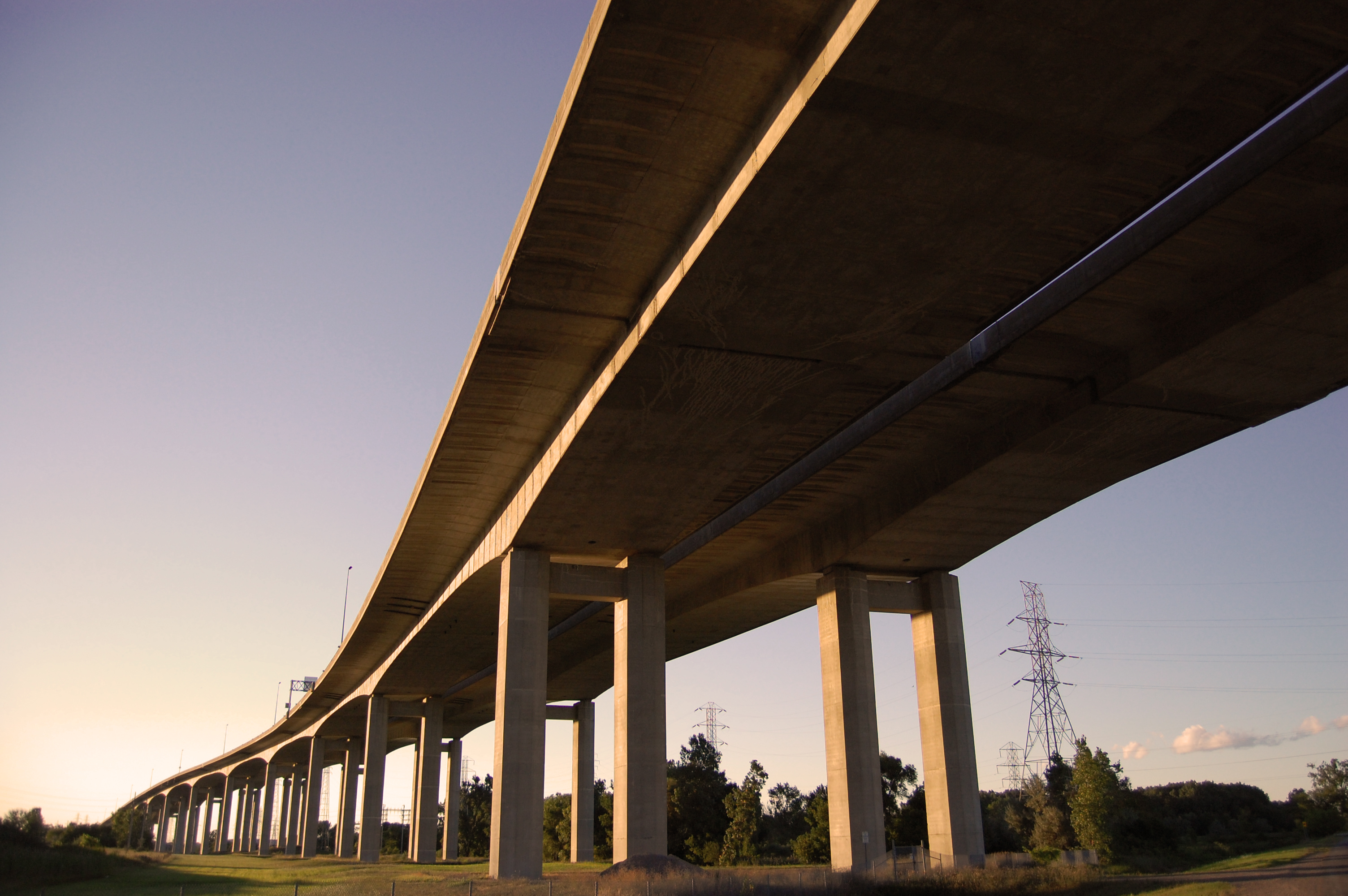
Zilwaukee Bridge at sunset

The provenance of the town's name is unknown, but local legends hold that it was a deliberate attempt to attract immigrants who thought they were heading for the larger Milwaukee, Wisconsin.

== Geography ==
According to the United States Census Bureau, the city has a total area of 2.37 square miles (6.14 km^{2}), of which 2.21 square miles (5.72 km^{2}) is land and 0.16 square miles (0.41 km^{2}) is water.

== Demographics ==
Historical population
Census	Pop.	Note	%±
1880	915		—
1970	2,072		—
1980	2,201		6.2%
1990	1,850		−15.9%
2000	1,799		−2.8%
2010	1,658		−7.8%
2020	1,534		−7.5%
U.S. Decennial Census

=== 2020 census ===
As of the 2020 census, Zilwaukee had a population of 1,534. The median age was 45.7 years. 18.1% of residents were under the age of 18 and 20.8% of residents were 65 years of age or older. For every 100 females there were 101.0 males, and for every 100 females age 18 and over there were 97.6 males age 18 and over.

100.0% of residents lived in urban areas, while 0.0% lived in rural areas.

There were 685 households in Zilwaukee, of which 22.5% had children under the age of 18 living in them. Of all households, 45.1% were married-couple households, 19.6% were households with a male householder and no spouse or partner present, and 26.0% were households with a female householder and no spouse or partner present. About 30.8% of all households were made up of individuals and 12.9% had someone living alone who was 65 years of age or older.

There were 721 housing units, of which 5.0% were vacant. The homeowner vacancy rate was 0.6% and the rental vacancy rate was 6.0%.

Racial composition as of the 2020 census
Race	Number	Percent
White	1,316	85.8%
Black or African American	29	1.9%
American Indian and Alaska Native	5	0.3%
Asian	5	0.3%
Native Hawaiian and Other Pacific Islander	0	0.0%
Some other race	44	2.9%
Two or more races	135	8.8%
Hispanic or Latino (of any race)	147	9.6%

=== 2010 census ===
As of the census of 2010, there were 1,658 people, 671 households, and 442 families living in the city. The population density was 750.2 inhabitants per square mile (289.7/km^{2}). There were 723 housing units at an average density of 327.1 per square mile (126.3/km^{2}). The racial makeup of the city was 92.3% White, 3.7% African American, 0.5% Native American, 0.3% Asian, 1.6% from other races, and 1.6% from two or more races. Hispanic or Latino of any race were 7.7% of the population.

There were 671 households, of which 30.4% had children under the age of 18 living with them, 50.1% were married couples living together, 10.7% had a female householder with no husband present, 5.1% had a male householder with no wife present, and 34.1% were non-families. 27.3% of all households were made up of individuals, and 12.2% had someone living alone who was 65 years of age or older. The average household size was 2.47 and the average family size was 2.97.

The median age in the city was 40 years. 22.1% of residents were under the age of 18; 9.8% were between the ages of 18 and 24; 25.8% were from 25 to 44; 25.6% were from 45 to 64; and 16.6% were 65 years of age or older. The gender makeup of the city was 49.8% male and 50.2% female.

=== 2000 census ===
As of the census of 2000, there were 1,799 people, 711 households, and 509 families living in the city. The population density was 810.7 inhabitants per square mile (313.0/km^{2}). There were 729 housing units at an average density of 328.5 per square mile (126.8/km^{2}). The racial makeup of the city was 93.94% White, 1.78% African American, 0.44% Native American, 0.50% Asian, 2.61% from other races, and 0.72% from two or more races. Hispanic or Latino of any race were 6.23% of the population.

There were 711 households, out of which 28.1% had children under the age of 18 living with them, 57.8% were married couples living together, 10.4% had a female householder with no husband present, and 28.3% were non-families. 22.9% of all households were made up of individuals, and 9.1% had someone living alone who was 65 years of age or older. The average household size was 2.53 and the average family size was 2.98.

In the city, the population was spread out, with 23.5% under the age of 18, 6.7% from 18 to 24, 31.2% from 25 to 44, 24.5% from 45 to 64, and 14.2% who were 65 years of age or older. The median age was 37 years. For every 100 females, there were 95.3 males. For every 100 females age 18 and over, there were 93.7 males.

The median income for a household in the city was $42,014, and the median income for a family was $47,981. Males had a median income of $37,292 versus $25,586 for females. The per capita income for the city was $19,491. About 5.7% of families and 6.4% of the population were below the poverty line, including 10.4% of those under age 18 and 5.8% of those age 65 or over.

== Notable people ==
- John Baird (1860–1934), state senator and state representative, director of Michigan Conservation Department
- Bernard C. Wetzel (1876–1952), Detroit architect
