= Roy Schmidt (politician) =

American politician

Member of the Michigan House of Representatives from the 76th district
- In office January 1, 2009 – January 1, 2013
- Succeeded by: Winnie Brinks

Personal details
- Born: September 4, 1953 (age 73) Grand Rapids, Michigan
- Party: Democratic (until 2012) Republican (since 2012)
- Spouse: Donna

Roy Schmidt is an American former politician. He served several terms as a member of the Grand Rapids, Michigan City Commission, and two terms as a member of the Michigan House of Representatives representing the 76th district, which includes part of the Grand Rapids metropolitan area. He retired from politics after losing re-election following a change of parties and controversial campaign activities.

== Career ==
Beginning in the late 1980s, Schmidt was active in the West Grand Neighborhood Organization, becoming a board member and later president. Schmidt served 16 years as one of two non-partisan commissioners for Grand Rapids' 1st ward, representing the city's northwest side.

He was elected to the state House of Representatives in 2008 as a conservative Democrat, and was re-elected in 2010. In 2012, after fund-raising as a Democrat, he quietly changed parties and filed to run for re-election as a Republican, 10 minutes before the filing deadline. Meanwhile, Schmidt's son offered family friend Matt Mojzak $1000 to take Schmidt's place as the only Democratic candidate on the ballot, but not campaign. Mojzak filed, but when the scheme became public knowledge, growing scrutiny forced him to abandon his "candidacy". Schmidt won the Republican primary, but lost the general election to Winnie Brinks, who had run as a write-in Democratic candidate in response to Schmidt's change of party. Schmidt and state house speaker Jase Bolger were investigated by the Michigan State Police for potential fraud. Kent County Prosecutor Bill Forsyth condemned the scheme as a "travesty" that should not have been allowed to happen. However, no charges were filed after Forsyth found nothing in Michigan law against it. Schmidt subsequently apologized for his role in the scheme, saying he had made "a dumb political decision."

== Personal life ==
Schmidt earned a BBA from Aquinas College. He and his wife Donna have three children. He is Roman Catholic.

In 2016, Schmidt pleaded "no contest" to a charge of growing marijuana for sale; police had confiscated three pounds of marijuana and 71 plants at one of his two homes. He dropped his initial defense that he was acting under the state's "medical marijuana" law, and admitted that he had been supplying "no more than 20" customers who were not his patients. He was sentenced to 45 days in jail and two years of probation.
