= Freeman, Washington =

Unincorporated community in Washington, United States

- Unincorporated community
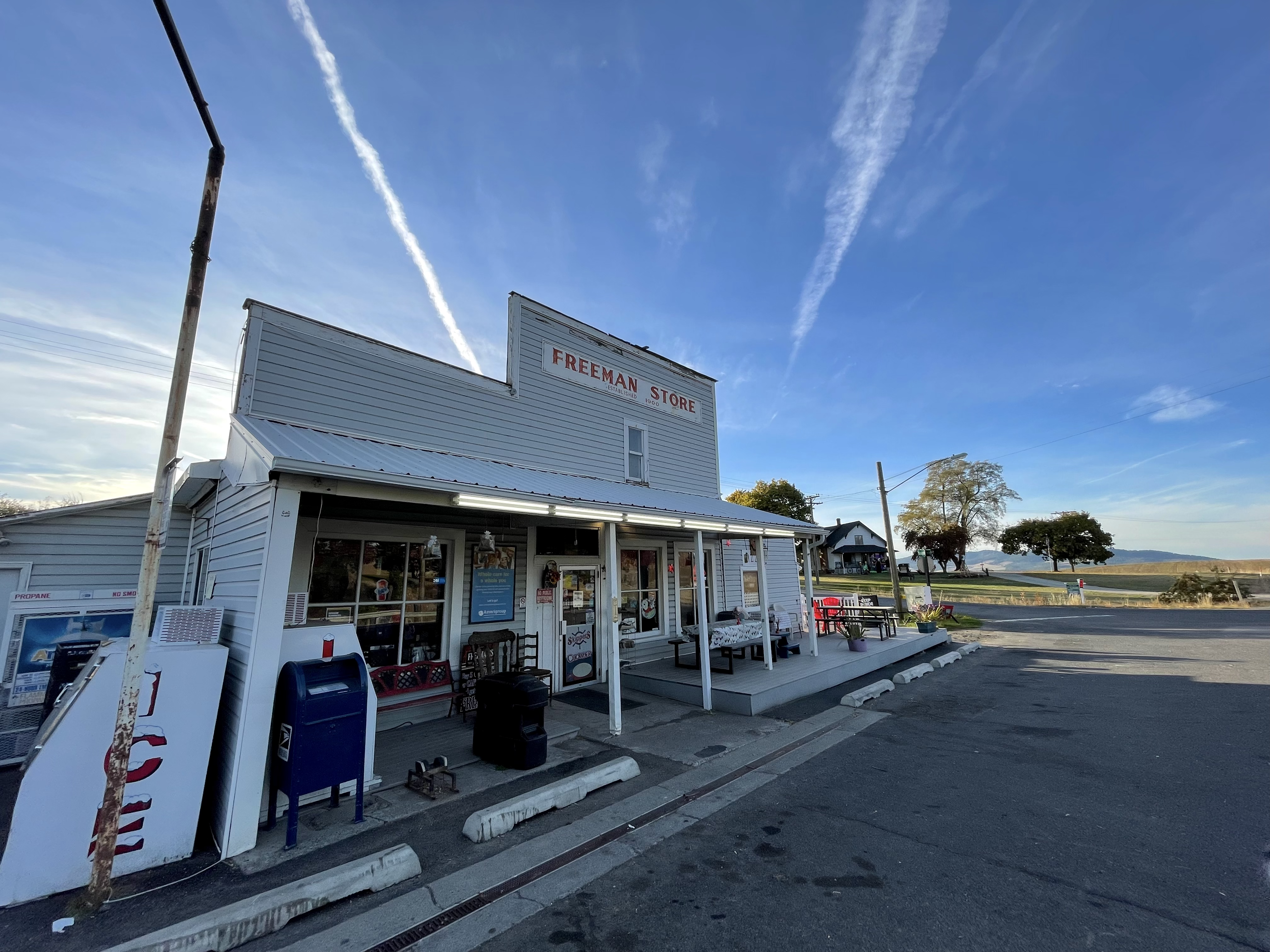

- Location within Washington (state)
- Coordinates: 47°31′06″N 117°11′45″W
- Country: United States
- State: Washington
- County: Spokane
- Elevation: 2,620 ft (800 m)
- Time zone: UTC-8 (Pacific (PST))
  - Summer (DST): UTC-7 (PDT)
- ZIP code: 99030
- Area code: 509
- GNIS feature ID: 1512227

Freeman is an unincorporated community in Spokane County, Washington, United States. It is notable as being the location of the public elementary, middle and high schools serving a large area of rural southeast Spokane County.

== History ==
Washington Brick and Lime, headquartered a few miles to the north in Mica, had a plant in Freeman in the late 1800s. Around the turn of the century, a number of businesses opened in Freeman. None remain in business today, but the site of the C.P. Thomas Mercantile and Post Office is now the location of Freeman Market, a small market and restaurant located at the turnoff from State Route 27.

Freeman is named for Freeman W. Freeman, a telegraph operator at the community's railroad station. The Spokane and Inland Empire Railroad ran through the community.

On September 13, 2017, a school shooting at Freeman High School resulted in the death of one student and injuries to three others.

== Geography ==
State Route 27 runs through Freeman, connecting it with Spokane Valley, about ten miles to the north, and the rest of the Spokane area. To the south, State Route 27 connects Freeman with numerous other small towns on the Palouse. Freeman itself is located on the northern edge of the Palouse farming region, with its gentle rolling hills giving way to the foothills of the Selkirk Mountains a few miles north and east of Freeman. Mica Peak and its foothills rise immediately to the east and Krell Hill with its TV towers are visible about five miles to the northwest. Little Cottonwood Creek, an ephemeral tributary of Latah Creek, flows from the slopes of Mica Peak and along the southeastern edge of the community.

Farmland surrounds the community on all sides, with homes spaced well apart. The community itself is dominated by three schools: Freeman Elementary School, Freeman Middle School and Freeman High School. There are also grain elevators and a market on State Route 27 at Freeman.

Freeman sits at the junction of three ecoregions as defined by the World Wildlife Fund, giving the area traits from all three. The Okanagan dry forests ecoregion begins at Freeman and stretches northwest through Spokane, the Okanagan, and into the Thompson Plateau of British Columbia. Tall ponderosa pine trees are a remnant of the nature of the ecoregion prior to development of the community and agriculture. In the immediate vicinity of Freeman, the Okanagan dry forests transition into the rolling, grassy hills of Palouse grasslands ecoregion. The Palouse grasslands and Okanagan dry forests transition into the North Central Rockies forests as the land climbs up the slopes of the Selkirk Mountains immediately to the north and east.

== Gallery ==
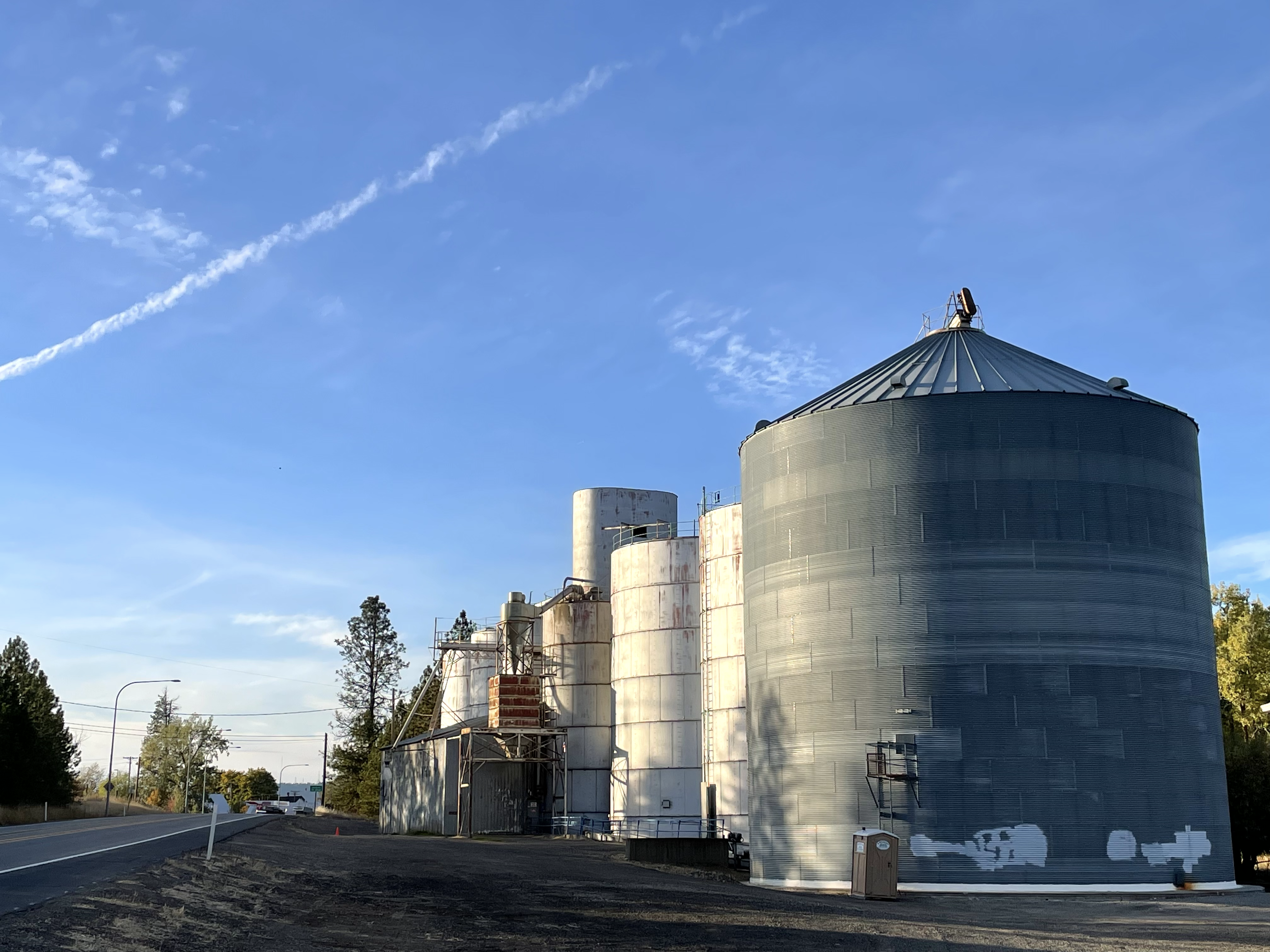
The Rockford Grain Growers Freeman Elevator with State Route 27 to the left.

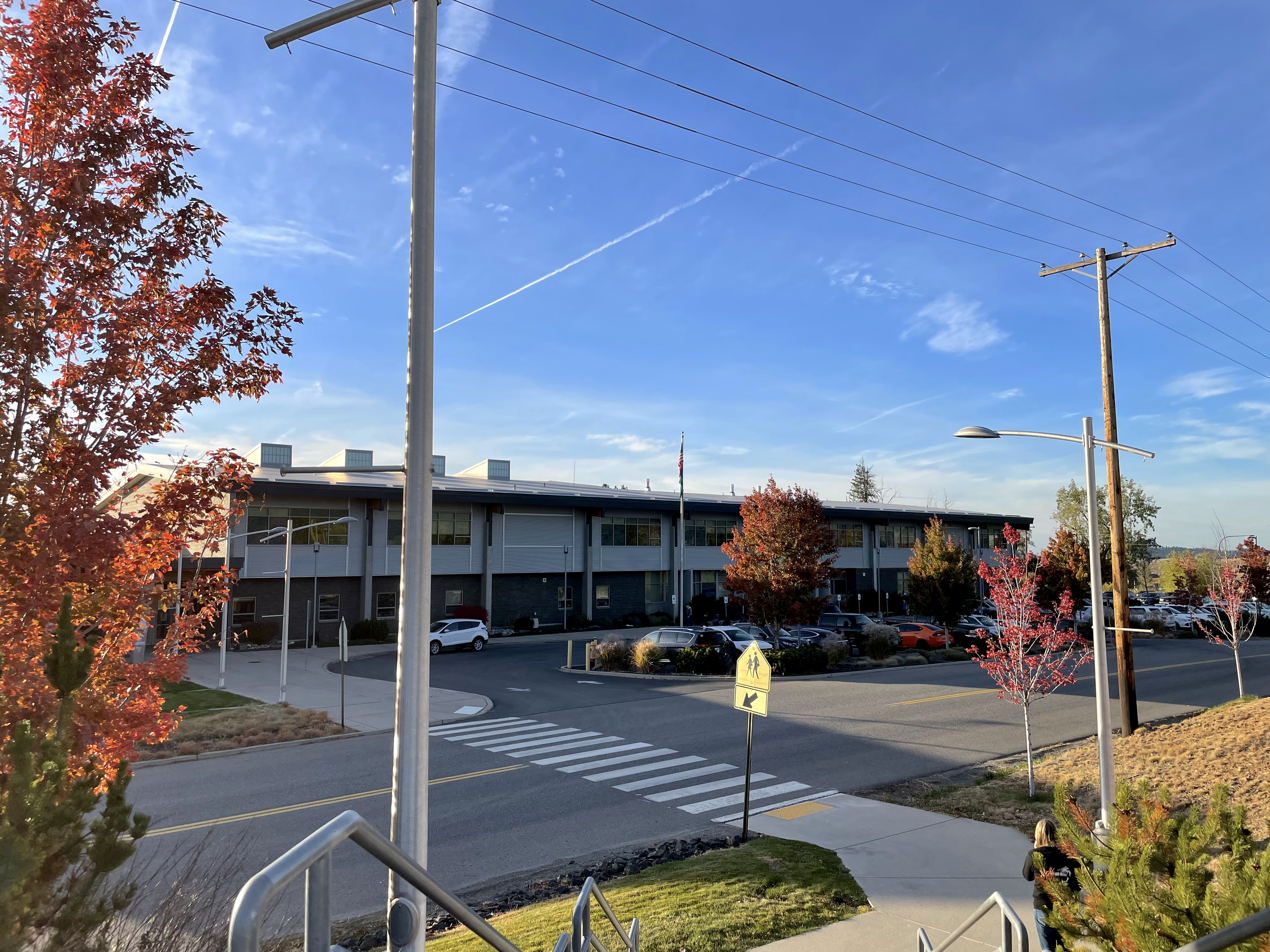
Freeman High School on an autumn afternoon.

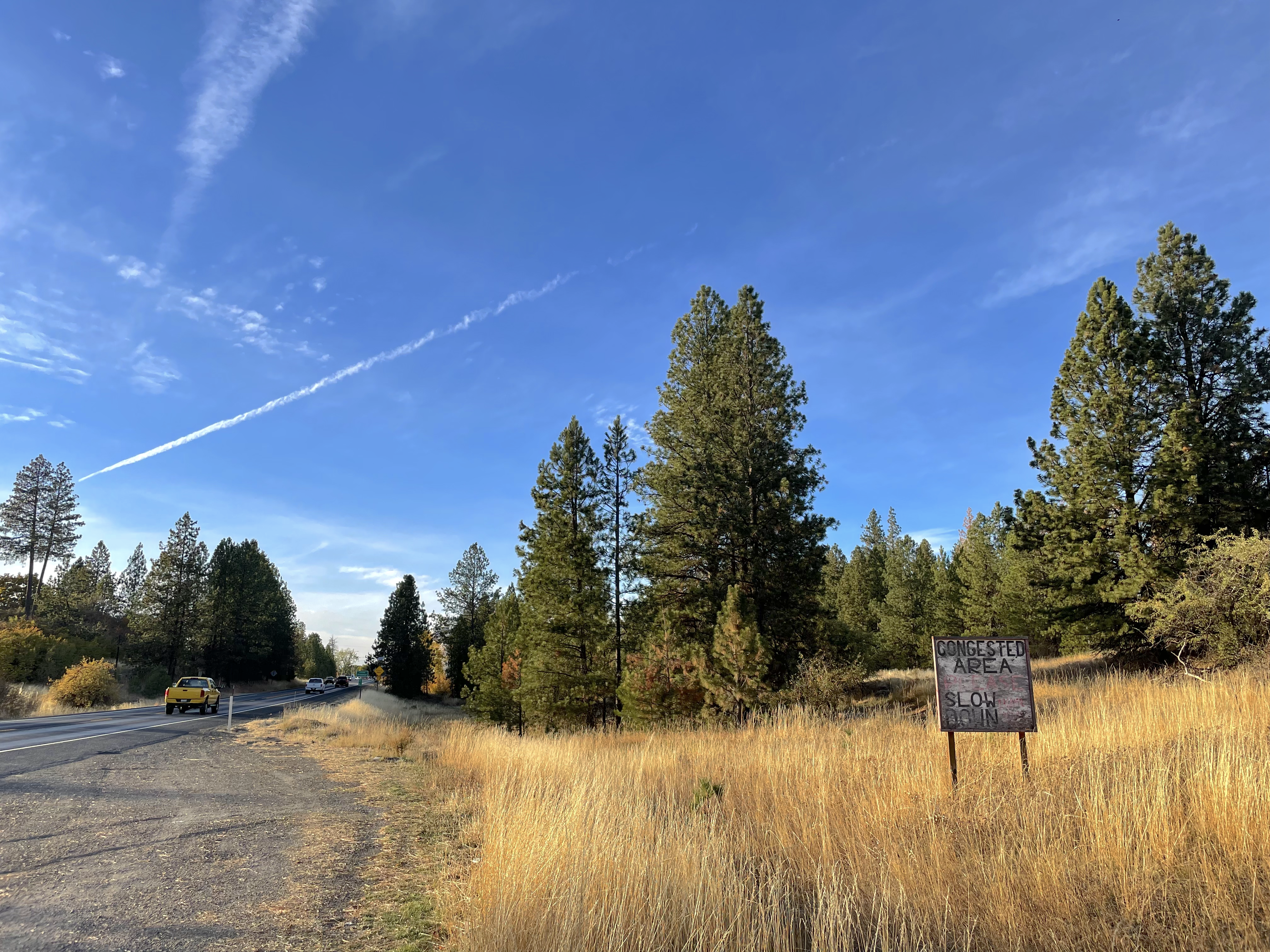
A sign asking motorists on State Route 27 to slow down as they pass through Freeman.
