= National Register of Historic Places listings in Lincoln County, Washington =

Location of Lincoln County in Washington

This list presents the full set of buildings, structures, objects, sites, or districts designated on the National Register of Historic Places in Lincoln County, Washington, and offers brief descriptive information about each of them. The National Register recognizes places of national, state, or local historic significance across the United States. Out of over 90,000 National Register sites nationwide, Washington is home to approximately 1,500, and 11 of those are found partially or wholly in Lincoln County.

This National Park Service list is complete through NPS recent listings posted August 28, 2026.

== Current listings ==
	Name on the Register	Image	Date listed	Location	City or town	Description
1	Almira Hotel	Almira Hotel	March 15, 2006 (#06000137)	3 N. Third Ave. 47°42′46″N 118°56′27″W	Almira	
2	Atlas E Missile Site 9		July 31, 2009 (#09000579)	36000 Crescent Rd. N. 47°47′18″N 117°50′31″W	Reardan	
3	Fort Spokane Military Reserve	Fort Spokane Military Reserve	November 23, 1988 (#88002621)	Rt. 25; 47°54′47″N 118°18′22″W	Miles	
4	Goose Creek Rockshelter		May 22, 1978 (#78002763)	Address Restricted	Wilbur	
5	Harrington Bank Block and Opera House	Harrington Bank Block and Opera House	October 2, 1992 (#92001288)	Jct. of Third and Willis Sts., NW corner 47°28′49″N 118°15′13″W	Harrington	
6	Lincoln Hotel	Lincoln Hotel	December 20, 2010 (#10001044)	301 W. Sherlock St. 47°28′44″N 118°15′17″W	Harrington	
7	Little Falls Hydroelectric Power Plant	Little Falls Hydroelectric Power Plant	December 15, 1988 (#88002737)	Spokane River; 47°49′53″N 117°55′00″W	Reardan	
8	Long Lake Hydroelectric Power Plant	Long Lake Hydroelectric Power Plant	December 15, 1988 (#88002738)	Spokane River; 47°50′10″N 117°50′19″W	Ford	
9	Mary Queen of Heaven Roman Catholic Church	Mary Queen of Heaven Roman Catholic Church	April 26, 1990 (#90000675)	N. First and B St. 47°18′09″N 117°58′30″W	Sprague	
10	Spokane River Bridge at Fort Spokane	Spokane River Bridge at Fort Spokane	March 28, 1995 (#95000261)	WA 25 over the Spokane R. 47°54′30″N 118°18′59″W	Hunters	Bridges of Washington State MPS
11	Spokane River Bridge at Long Lake Dam	Spokane River Bridge at Long Lake Dam	May 24, 1995 (#95000628)	WA 231 over the Spokane R. 47°50′19″N 117°51′05″W	Reardan	Bridges of Washington State MPS

== See also ==
- National Register of Historic Places listings in Washington state
- Listings in neighboring counties: Adams, Ferry, Grant, Okanogan, Spokane, Stevens, Whitman
- Historic preservation
- History of Washington (state)
- Index of Washington (state)-related articles
