= National Register of Historic Places listings in Stevens County, Washington =

Location of Stevens County in Washington

This list presents the full set of buildings, structures, objects, sites, or districts designated on the National Register of Historic Places in Stevens County, Washington, and offers brief descriptive information about each of them. The National Register recognizes places of national, state, or local historic significance across the United States. Out of over 90,000 National Register sites nationwide, Washington is home to approximately 1,500, and 25 of those are found partially or wholly in Stevens County.

This National Park Service list is complete through NPS recent listings posted May 8, 2026.

== Current listings ==
	Name on the Register	Image	Date listed	Location	City or town	Description
1	Barstow Bridge		March 30, 1995 (#95000263)	US 395 and Co. Rd. 4061 over the Kettle River; 48°47′05″N 118°07′32″W	Kettle Falls	Bridges of Washington State MPS, also extends into Ferry County. Removed and replaced in 2010.
2	Clayton School	Clayton School	August 28, 2003 (#03000862)	Corner of Park Ave. and Swenson Rd. 47°59′45″N 117°33′57″W	Clayton	Rural Public Schools of Washington State MPS
3	Collins Building	Collins Building	November 19, 1998 (#98001418)	202 S. Main St. 48°32′36″N 117°54′23″W	Colville	
4	Columbia River Bridge at Kettle Falls	Columbia River Bridge at Kettle Falls	March 28, 1995 (#95000260)	US 395 over the Columbia River; 48°37′34″N 118°07′01″W	Kettle Falls	Bridges of Washington State MPS, also extends into Ferry County
5	Columbia River Bridge at Northport	Columbia River Bridge at Northport	May 24, 1995 (#95000624)	WA 25 over the Columbia R. 48°55′21″N 117°46′32″W	Northport	Bridges of Washington State MPS
6	Colville Flour Mill	Colville Flour Mill	June 29, 1995 (#95000809)	466 W. First St. 48°32′39″N 117°54′40″W	Colville	
7	Hudsons Bay Gristmill Site on Colville River	Hudsons Bay Gristmill Site on Colville River	April 12, 1982 (#82004295)	Address Restricted	Kettle Falls	
8	Keller House	Keller House	April 18, 1979 (#79002559)	700 N. Wynne St. 48°33′05″N 117°54′25″W	Colville	
9	Kettle Falls District		November 20, 1974 (#74000352)	Address Restricted	Kettle Falls	
10	Little Falls Hydroelectric Power Plant	Little Falls Hydroelectric Power Plant	December 15, 1988 (#88002737)	Spokane River; 47°49′53″N 117°55′00″W	Reardan	
11	Long Lake Hydroelectric Power Plant	Long Lake Hydroelectric Power Plant	December 15, 1988 (#88002738)	Spokane River; 47°50′10″N 117°50′19″W	Ford	
12	Long Lake Pictographs		May 24, 1976 (#76001922)	Address Restricted	Ford	
13	Loon Lake School	Loon Lake School	November 19, 1992 (#92001592)	4000 Colville Rd. 48°03′48″N 117°37′54″W	Loon Lake	Rural Public Schools of Washington State MPS
14	H. M. McCauley House		April 18, 1979 (#79002560)	285 Oak St. 48°32′42″N 117°54′13″W	Colville	Destroyed by fire, March, 1992.
15	Meyers Falls Power Plant Historic District	Meyers Falls Power Plant Historic District	June 29, 1995 (#95000808)	0.5 mi. S of Kettle Falls at Colville R., on either side of Juniper St. 48°35′42″N 118°03′36″W	Kettle Falls	
16	Northport School	Northport School	October 4, 1979 (#79002561)	South and 7th Sts. 48°54′49″N 117°46′59″W	Northport	
17	Old Indian Agency	Old Indian Agency	May 17, 1974 (#74001981)	309 N. 3rd St. E. 48°16′44″N 117°42′50″W	Chewelah	
18	Opera House and IOOF Lodge	Opera House and IOOF Lodge	April 18, 1997 (#97000319)	151 W. 1st Ave. 48°32′40″N 117°54′18″W	Colville	
19	Orient Bridge	Orient Bridge	July 16, 1982 (#82004297)	Richardson Rd., Spans Kettle River; 48°51′59″N 118°11′52″W	Orient	Historic Bridges and Tunnels in Washington TR, also extends into Ferry County
20	Red Mountain Railroad Bridge		July 16, 1982 (#82004296)	Spans Little Sheep Creek; 48°58′03″N 117°48′53″W	Northport	Historic Bridges and Tunnels in Washington TR
21	Rickey Block	Rickey Block	June 30, 1995 (#95000807)	230 S. Main St. 48°32′35″N 117°54′22″W	Colville	
22	St. Paul's Mission	St. Paul's Mission	November 20, 1974 (#74002259)	West of Kettle Falls on Lake Roosevelt; 48°37′37″N 118°06′18″W	Kettle Falls	
23	Spokane River Bridge at Long Lake Dam	Spokane River Bridge at Long Lake Dam	May 24, 1995 (#95000628)	WA 231 over the Spokane R. 47°50′19″N 117°51′05″W	Reardan	extends into Lincoln County, Washington
24	U.S. Post Office – Colville Main	U.S. Post Office – Colville Main	August 7, 1991 (#91000644)	204 S. Oak; 48°32′35″N 117°54′13″W	Colville	
25	Colburn T. Winslow House	Colburn T. Winslow House	April 26, 1990 (#90000670)	458 E. 2nd St. 48°32′43″N 117°53′57″W	Colville	

== Former listings ==
	Name on the Register	Image	Date listed	Date removed	Location	City or town	Description
1	Winslow Railroad Bridge		July 16, 1982 (#82004298)	December 15, 1999	S of Colville	Colville	Destroyed by fire on August 27, 1999.

== See also ==
- National Register of Historic Places listings in Washington state
- Listings in neighboring counties: Ferry, Lincoln, Pend Oreille, Spokane
- Historic preservation
- History of Washington (state)
- Index of Washington (state)-related articles
