= Washington State Route 231 =

State highway in eastern Washington, US

State Route 231

- A map of the Spokane area featuring the route of SR 231 highlighted in red.

Route information
- Auxiliary route of SR 23
- Maintained by WSDOT
- Length: 74.97 mi (120.65 km)
- Existed: 1964–present

Major junctions
- South end: SR 23 near Sprague
- US 2 in Reardan; SR 292 in Springdale
- North end: US 395 near Chewelah

Location
- Country: United States
- State: Washington
- Counties: Lincoln, Stevens

Highway system
- State highways in Washington; Interstate; US; State; Scenic; Pre-1964; 1964 renumbering; Former
← SR 225	→ SR 240

State Route 231 (SR 231) is a 74.97-mile (120.65 km) long state highway in the U.S. state of Washington serving communities in Lincoln and Stevens counties. The highway, located entirely west of Spokane in the Inland Empire, serves Sprague, Edwall, Reardan, Springdale, Valley and Chewelah. The route extends from SR 23 north of Sprague to a concurrency with U.S. Route 2 (US 2) near Reardan and an intersection with US 395 south of Chewelah.

Although SR 231 was established in 1964, the US 2 concurrency has existed as State Road 7 since 1909. Later, Secondary State Highway 2G (SSH 2G) and Secondary State Highway 3J (SSH 3J) were established in 1937 and formed SR 231 in 1964. The highway crosses the Spokane River on the Spokane River Bridge at Long Lake Dam, which was constructed in 1949 and added to the National Register of Historic Places in 1995 before repair work in late 2008.

== Route description ==
State Route 231 (SR 231) begins at SR 23 0.79 miles (1.27 km) north of Sprague and a diamond interchange with Interstate 90 (I-90), co-signed as U.S. Route 395 (US 395). SR 23 is the "parent" or main route of SR 231 and travels northwest to Harrington and south to Downtown Sprague, spanning 66.00 miles (106.22 km), 8.97 miles (14.44 km) shorter than SR 231. Traveling northeast, the highway traverses a hill and cliff, passing Browns Lake, and turns west. The direction of the roadway becomes north through a narrow valley and SR 231 arrives in Edwall as Oregon Street. The roadway briefly turns east as Main Street before crossing a BNSF Railway line and continuing northeast alongside the tracks. After turning north into the plains, the highway parallels Crab Creek to intersect US 2 west of Reardan.

Becoming concurrent with US 2, the road becomes Broadway Street and enters Reardan. SR 231 turns north at Aspen Street and crosses the Eastern Washington Gateway Railroad and a marsh via a causeway. As Spring Creek Road, the highway travels northwest parallel to Spring Creek into Spring Creek Canyon. After the canyon, the roadway crosses the Spokane River on the Spokane River Bridge at Long Lake Dam, the border between Lincoln and Stevens counties, west of Little Falls Dam and Long Lake. Nearly a mile north of the bridge, SR 231 intersects SR 291, a connector to Spokane. After the intersection, the highway travels north through the community of Ford and continues through a valley into Springdale. Within Springdale, the roadway is named Second Street and intersects SR 292, which connects east to US 395 near Loon Lake. After crossing a BNSF Railway track, Second Street turns west as Shaffer Street and passes the Springdale Community Health Center, the local medical clinic. SR 231 crosses Sheep Creek and the same railway as Second Street and leaves Springdale, parallel to the railroad, into a valley. The highway intersects former SR 232 and ends at an intersection with US 395 4.27 miles (6.87 km) south of Chewelah.

== History ==
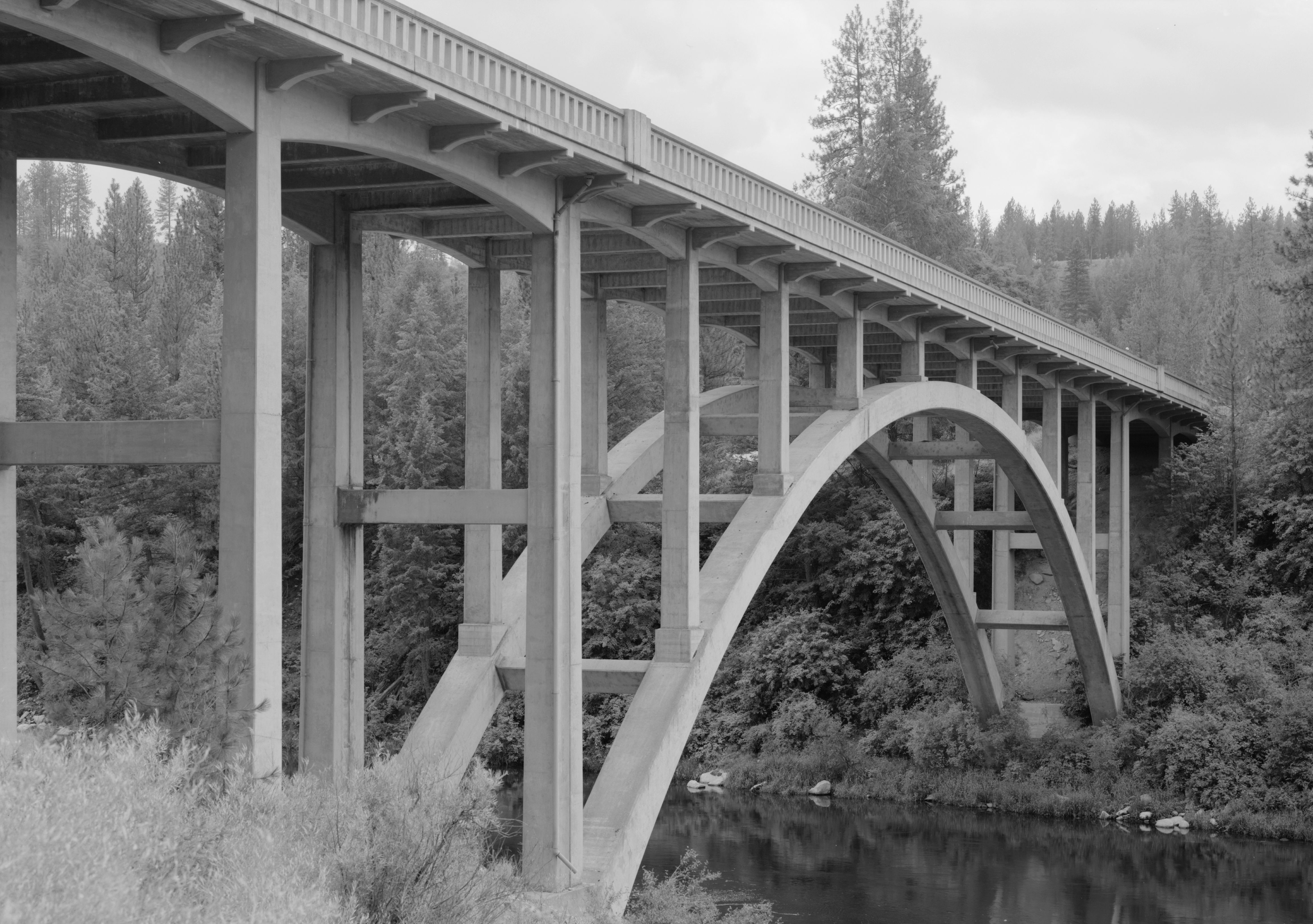
The Spokane River Bridge at Long Lake Dam, pictured here in 1993, was constructed in 1949 over the Spokane River and was designated as part of Secondary State Highway 3J (SSH 3J) during a 1963 extension. SSH 3J was replaced by SR 231 during the 1964 highway renumbering and was added to the National Register of Historic Places on May 24, 1993 before being repaired in late 2008.

SR 231 was established in 1964, but sections of the current route have been in the state highway system as early as 1909, when State Road 7 was established and included a section near Reardan. In 1913, the Inland Empire Highway was established and connected Loon Lake to Springdale and Chewelah. A county-maintained road connected Sprague to Browns Lake by 1919 and in 1923, State Road 7 became State Road 2 and the Inland Empire Highway became State Road 3. The U.S. route system was formed in 1926 and two highways, numbered U.S. Route 10 (US 10) and U.S. Route 395 (US 395), were co-signed with State Roads 2 and 3, respectively. State Road 2 became Primary State Highway 2 (PSH 2) in 1937 and a secondary route, Secondary State Highway 2G (SSH 2G) was created, extending from Sprague to Reardan, in 1937. State Road 3 became PSH 3 during the same year and a secondary route, SSH 3J, was also established to span from the Little Falls Dam at Long Lake to Springdale.

US 10 was replaced by the western extension of US 2 in 1946. Three years later, the Spokane River Bridge at Long Lake Dam was constructed and spanned from the southern terminus of SSH 3J to Lincoln County. It opened to traffic in March 1950.

In 1957, PSH 3 and US 395 were moved to an eastern route bypassing Springdale, while SSH 3J was extended north towards Chewelah and a branch of the highway was added to Loon Lake, both along the former route of PSH 3. SSH 3J was extended south to PSH 2 and US 2 in Reardan, east of the northern terminus of SSH 2G, in 1963. During the 1964 highway renumbering, SR 231 was created from SSH 2G and SSH 3J and became concurrent with US 2; US 2 replaced PSH 2 and US 395 replaced PSH 3, while the branch of SSH 3J to Loon Lake became SR 292. The Spokane River Bridge was added to the National Register of Historic Places on June 2, 1995 along with the rest of the bridges on the Spokane River northwest of Spokane, and the bridge was repaired in late 2008. In the 1990s, the state proposed a jurisdictional transfer with Lincoln County to decommission the Sprague–Reardan section of SR 231. The highway was later used to haul uranium waste by truck following attempts by WSDOT to force the contractor to fund safety improvements on its haul route.

== Major intersections ==
County	Location	mi	km	Destinations	Notes
Lincoln		0.00	0.00	SR 23 – Sprague, Harrington	
Lincoln		28.01	45.08	US 2 west – Wenatchee	Southern end of US 2 concurrency
Lincoln	Reardan	30.89	49.71	US 2 east – Spokane	Northern end of US 2 concurrency
Stevens		45.23	72.79	SR 291 east – Tum Tum, Spokane	
Stevens	Springdale	61.95	99.70	SR 292 east – Loon Lake	
Stevens		70.24	113.04	To US 395 south – Spokane	Former SR 232
Stevens		74.97	120.65	US 395 north – Colville	
1.000 mi = 1.609 km; 1.000 km = 0.621 mi
