= List of crossings of the Spokane River =

This is a list of crossings of the Spokane River, including auto, pedestrian and railroad bridges, from its mouth at the Columbia River to its source at Lake Coeur d'Alene.

== Crossings ==
All locations are in Washington unless otherwise specified.

| Image | Crossing | Location | Opened | Coordinates | Notes |
|---|---|---|---|---|---|
| | Spokane River Bridge at Fort Spokane SR 25 | Fort Spokane | 1941 | 47.907916°N 118.317557°W | NRHP |
| | Little Falls Road | Little Falls | | 47.829008°N 117.918408°W | Located at the Little Falls Hydroelectric Power Plant |
| | Spokane River Bridge at Long Lake Dam SR 231 | Long Lake | 1949 | 47.838726°N 117.852442°W | NRHP |
| | Charles Road | Nine Mile Falls | | 47.776938°N 117.544859°W | |
| | Seven Mile Road | Nine Mile Falls | | 47.740640°N 117.519485°W | |
| | Bowl & Pitcher Footbridge | Spokane | 1941 | 47.696724°N 117.497694°W | In Riverside State Park |
| | T. J. Meenach Bridge; Whistalks Way | Spokane | | 47.679870°N 117.452659°W | Carries Spokane River Centennial Trail |
| | Sandifur Memorial Footbridge | Spokane | | 47.656671°N 117.454329°W | |
| | Maple Street Bridge | Spokane | 1958 | 47.660765°N 117.435354°W | |
| | Monroe Street Bridge | Spokane | 1911 | 47.660596°N 117.426688°W | Replaced 1889 and 1892 bridges |
| | Post Street | Spokane | 2024 | 47.662157°N 117.424328°W | Replaced 1917 bridge |
| | Upper Falls Suspension Footbridges | Spokane | 1974 | 47.663718°N 117.423008°W | Crosses north branch in Riverfront Park |
| | Upper Falls Suspension Footbridges | Spokane | 1974 | 47.662808°N 117.422772°W | Crosses south branch in Riverfront Park |
| | Howard Street Middle Channel Bridges | Spokane | | 47.664296°N 117.420787°W | Crosses north branch in Riverfront Park |
| | Howard Street Middle Channel Bridges | Spokane | 1916 | 47.663060°N 117.421034°W | Crosses south branch in Riverfront Park |
| | Washington Street | Spokane | 1985 | 47.663398°N 117.417891°W | Replaced 1908 bridge. Passes through Riverfront Park |
| | Lou Barbieri Footbridge | Spokane | | 47.663253°N 117.416173°W | Crosses north branch Riverfront Park |
| | Division Street Bridge | Spokane | | 47.662703°N 117.411167°W | Carries U.S. Route 2 |
| | Don Kardong Pedestrian Bridge | Spokane | 1920s | 47.663441°N 117.403000°W | Replaced 1892 bridge; converted to footbridge in 1988. Carries Spokane River Centennial Trail |
| | Spokane Falls Boulevard | Spokane | | 47.661887°N 117.400994°W | |
| | Hamilton Street | Spokane | | 47.660008°N 117.395976°W | |
| | Trent Avenue | Spokane | 1910 | 47.661887°N 117.393508°W | Being replaced as of 2021 |
| | Iron Bridge | Spokane | 1911 | 47.664479°N 117.392122°W | Converted to footbridge in 2012 |
| | BNSF Chewelah Subdivision | Spokane | | 47.666761°N 117.390781°W | |
| | Mission Avenue | Spokane | 1909 | 47.671764°N 117.387647°W | |
| | Greene Street | Spokane | 1955 | 47.678366°N 117.363779°W | |
| | Argonne Road | Millwood | 2004 | 47.689833°N 117.282771°W | Replaced 1920 bridge |
| | Plante's Ferry Footbridge | Spokane Valley | | 47.692922°N 117.250426°W | Carries Spokane River Centennial Trail |
| | Trent Avenue | Spokane Valley | | 47.691746°N 117.234908°W | |
| | BNSF Spokane Subdivision | Spokane Valley | | 47.690394°N 117.232454°W | |
| | UP Spokane International Railroad | Spokane Valley | | 47.677336°N 117.204855°W | |
| | Sullivan Road | Spokane Valley | | 47.672498°N 117.196550°W | |
| | Barker Road | Spokane Valley | | 47.678091°N 117.153950°W | |
| | Harvard Road | Liberty Lake and Otis Orchards-East Farms | | 47.683188°N 117.111264°W | |
| | Appleway Avenue | Otis Orchards-East Farms | | 47.698647°N 117.044382°W | |
| | I-90 | State Line, Idaho | | 47.696811°N 117.040830°W | |
| | North Idaho Centennial Trail | State Line, Idaho | | 47.695815°N 117.039353°W | Carries the Spokane River Centennial Trail |
| | Post Falls Dam Bridge | Post Falls, Idaho | | 47.711315°N 116.956128°W | Crosses side channel |
| | Spokane Street | Post Falls, Idaho | | 47.704011°N 116.948983°W | |
| | US 95 | Coeur d'Alene, Idaho | | 47.685992°N 116.799379°W | |

== Diversion channel ==
All locations are in Spokane's Riverfront Park. This corresponds to the area between the Post Street Bridge and Division Street Bridge above.

| Image | Crossing | Opened | Coordinates |
|---|---|---|---|
| | South Howard Street Footbridge | | 47.661026°N 117.421082°W |
| | Clock Tower Footbridge | | 47.661149°N 117.419436°W |
| | Stevens Street | | 47.661106°N 117.418932°W |
| | Washington Street | | 47.661091°N 117.418202°W |
| | King Cole Footbridge | | 47.661546°N 117.416153°W |
