= Washington State Route 292 =

State highway in Stevens County, Washington, US

State Route 292
- SR 292 highlighted in red

Route information
- Auxiliary route of US 395
- Maintained by WSDOT
- Length: 5.91 mi (9.51 km)
- Existed: 1964–present

Major junctions
- West end: SR 231 in Springdale
- East end: US 395 near Loon Lake

Location
- Country: United States
- State: Washington
- County: Stevens

Highway system
- State highways in Washington; Interstate; US; State; Scenic; Pre-1964; 1964 renumbering; Former
← SR 291	→ SR 300

State Route 292 (SR 292) is a state highway located entirely in Stevens County, Washington, United States. The east–west highway connects SR 231 in Springdale to U.S. Route 395 (US 395) at Loon Lake. It is approximately 6 miles (9.7 km) long and follows Sheep Creek and a railroad.

The highway was built in the early 20th century along the Spokane Falls and Northern Railway and was incorporated into the Inland Empire Highway in 1913. It later became part of US 395 until it was realigned in 1959 to bypass Springdale. The former highway became a branch of Secondary State Highway 3J (SSH 3J), which was renumbered to SR 292 in 1964.

== Route description ==
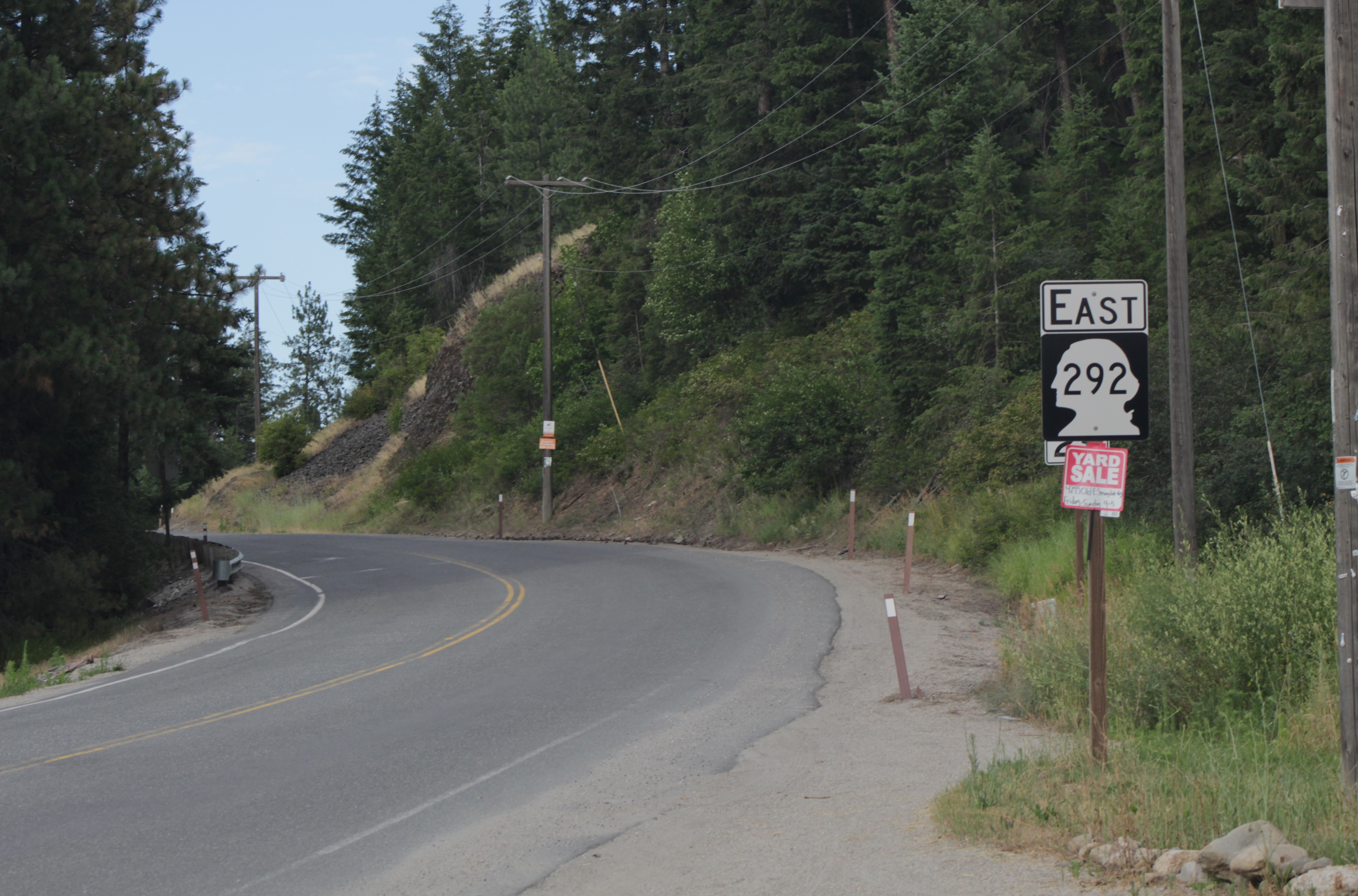
SR 292 near its western terminus at SR 231 in Springdale

State Route 292 (SR 292) begins in Springdale at an intersection with SR 231, the town's main street and a major north–south highway through Stevens County. The highway travels east from the town along the BNSF Railway's Kettle Falls Subdivision, a minor freight railroad, and Sheep Creek between Limekiln Hill and May Hill. It continues east into rolling forestland and passes farmland before descending towards the unincorporated community of Loon Lake. SR 292 crosses over Sheep Creek and under the railroad as it enters Loon Lake, where it passes north of the eponymous lake. The highway travels southeast through Loon Lake's small commercial district and terminates at a roundabout with US 395 and Garden Spot Road on the northeast shore of the lake.

The six-mile-long (9.7 km), two-lane highway primarily connects Springdale to Loon Lake, along with serving recreational traffic in the area. It is maintained by the Washington State Department of Transportation (WSDOT), which conducts an annual survey of traffic volume that is expressed in terms of annual average daily traffic. Average traffic volumes on SR 292 in 2016 ranged from a minimum of 2,300 vehicles at SR 231 in Springdale to a maximum of 3,400 vehicles in Loon Lake.

== History ==
The Spokane Falls and Northern Railway (later part of the Great Northern Railway) was completed between Spokane and Chewelah in 1889, providing a fixed overland link between Springdale and Loon Lake. A parallel wagon road was completed by 1910 and later classified as suitable for automobile travel. It was incorporated into the Inland Empire Highway, a state highway established in 1913 that connected the Palouse to Spokane and the Canadian border in Stevens County.

The Inland Empire Highway was assigned the designation of State Road 3 (later Primary State Highway 3) in 1923. It then became part of US 395, created in 1926 as part of the initial United States Numbered Highway System to connect Spokane to the Canadian border. Paving of the highway between Spokane and Kettle Falls began in 1931 and was completed a year later. The Springdale–Loon Lake section was rebuilt in 1951, including a new underpass under the Great Northern Railway.

The state government approved plans to realign US 395 between Loon Lake and Chewelah onto a straighter highway in early 1957. The new alignment would eliminate more than 45 curves and nearly 6 miles (9.7 km) between Spokane and Chewelah; it would cost $1.3 million to construct (equivalent to $10.8 million in 2023 dollars) and use funding from the federal government. Construction began in October 1957 and the new highway opened to traffic on November 10, 1959. The former route from Loon Lake to Springdale was retained as a branch of SSH 3J by the state legislature in early 1959.

SSH 3J was renumbered to SR 231 in 1964, while its east–west branch became SR 292. In 1991, the state government proposed decommissioning SR 292 and transferring it to county maintenance, but were opposed by civic leaders from Springdale who feared that logging trucks would be unable to use the county-maintained road. The proposal was rejected by the state legislature and resurfaced three years later, where it also failed to gain traction. In response to safety concerns and 19 collisions from 2017 to 2022, WSDOT constructed a roundabout to replace the eastern terminus of SR 292 at US 395 in Loon Lake. The roundabout was constructed beginning in September 2022 as part of a larger $12 million repaving project and opened to traffic in early October.

== Major intersections ==
The entire route is in Stevens County.

Location	mi	km	Destinations	Notes
Springdale	0.00	0.00	SR 231 (Main Street) – Reardan, Chewelah	
	5.91	9.51	US 395 – Colville, Spokane	Roundabout; continues as Garden Spot Road
1.000 mi = 1.609 km; 1.000 km = 0.621 mi
