= Spokane River Bridge at Long Lake Dam =

- U.S. National Register of Historic Places
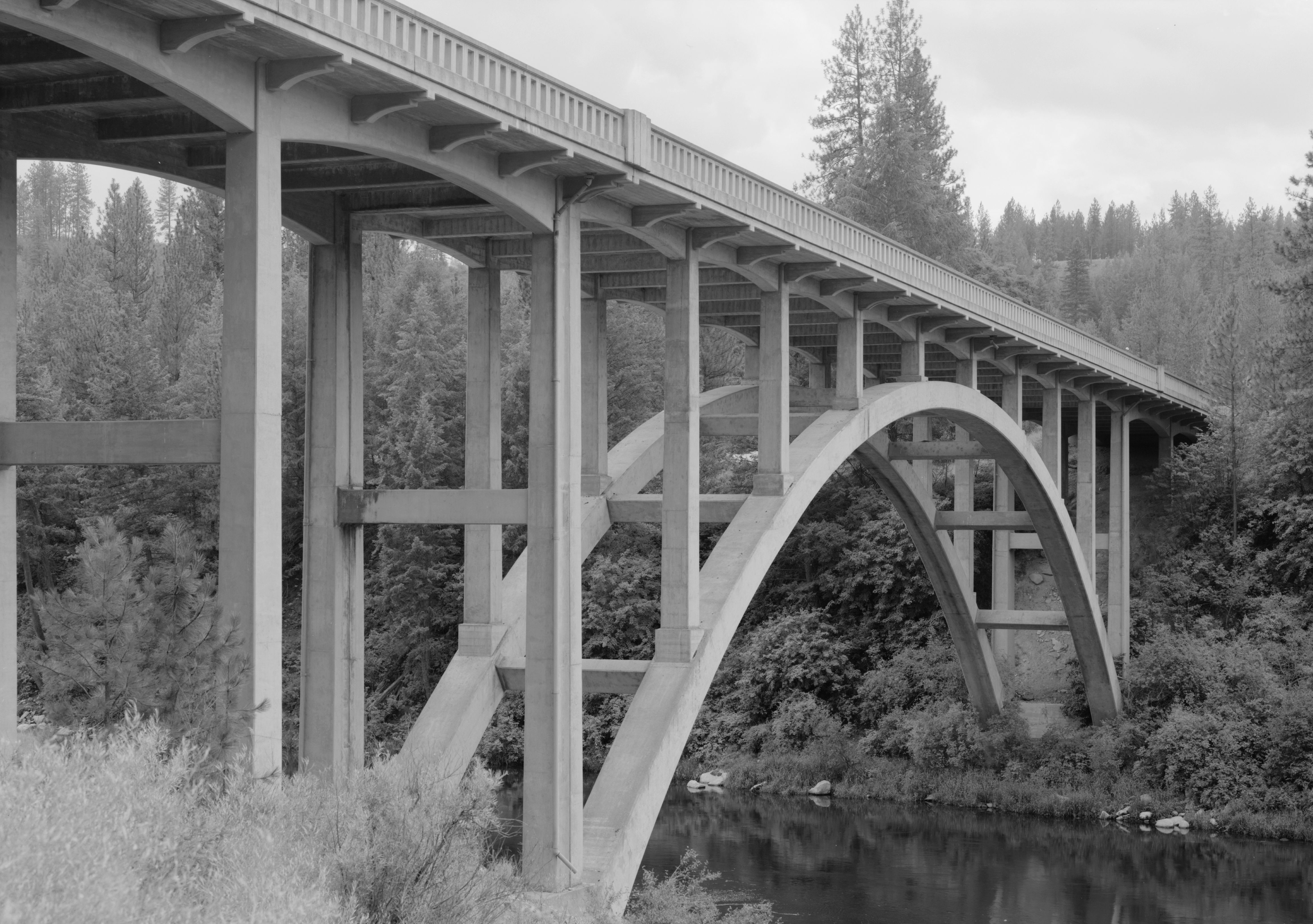

- Location within Washington (state)
- Nearest city: Reardan, Washington
- Coordinates: 47°50′20″N 117°51′08″W
- Area: Less than one acre
- Built: 1949
- Built by: State Department of Highways; Henry Hagman
- Architectural style: Arch
- MPS: Bridges of Washington State MPS
- NRHP reference No.: 95000628
- Added to NRHP: May 24, 1995

The Spokane River Bridge at Long Lake Dam, at Long Lake Dam near Reardan, Washington, is a historic 486-foot (148 m) concrete bridge that was built in 1949. It was a work of the State Department of Highways and of Henry Hagman. Its center span is a 211-foot (64 m) open-spandrel arch. The bridge was listed on the National Register of Historic Places in 1995.

It brings State Route 231 across the Spokane River, connecting Lincoln County and Stevens County.

== See also ==
- List of bridges documented by the Historic American Engineering Record in Washington (state)
- List of crossings of the Spokane River
