= Valley, Washington =

Unincorporated community in Washington, United States

- Unincorporated community and census-designated place
- Location within Washington (state)
- Coordinates: 48°10′22″N 117°43′28″W
- Country: United States
- State: Washington
- County: Stevens
- Elevation: 1,690 ft (520 m)

Population (2009)
  - Total: 1,915
- Time zone: UTC-8 (Pacific (PST))
  - Summer (DST): UTC-7 (PDT)
- ZIP code: 99181
- Area code: 509
- GNIS feature ID: 2586750

Valley is a census-designated place and unincorporated community in Stevens County, Washington, United States. As of the 2020 census, Valley had a population of 149.

The town of Valley was named by Daniel C. Corbin. Mr. Corbin named the town Valley, because it is at the entrance to the Colville Valley. The Spokane Falls and Northern Railway was connected to Valley in 1889. D. C.Corbin set up a small building for a depot.

Most inhabitants of the area were across the valley to the west of the river near the Fort Walla Walla Fort Colville Military Road. Few came to the east side, where current Valley is located, due to the swampy areas around the river. The oldest home in Valley was built in 1885 by the Jarvis family. John C. Jarvis was the first postmaster of Valley from December 1889 to November 1893.

George Kulzer came to Valley in 1889 and built a store, Kulzer and Son. In 1908, fire destroyed the store, saloon, and livery stable. The store was rebuilt and continues to stand today. George Kulzer built a corduroy road across the valley towards Waitts Lake.

Valley was first platted 29 July 1891. In the early days, Valley had its own bank, electric generator plant, phone company, water company and feed mill, two hotels, a drug store and blacksmith shop.

Valley is located on Washington State Route 231 8.5 miles (13.7 km) north of Springdale. Valley has a post office with ZIP code 99181.

Valley has an annual fair, the second Saturday of August. The emphasis is on creating an "old fashioned family atmosphere," and encouraging children and youth to learn and practice traditional craft, baking, and preservation skills.

== Demographics ==
Historical population
Census	Pop.	Note	%±
2010	146		—
2020	149		2.1%
U.S. Decennial Census; 2000 2010

Valley first appeared as a census designated place in the 2010 U.S. census.

=== Racial and ethnic composition ===
Valley CDP, Washington – Racial and ethnic composition Note: the US Census treats Hispanic/Latino as an ethnic category. This table excludes Latinos from the racial categories and assigns them to a separate category. Hispanics/Latinos may be of any race.
Race / Ethnicity (NH = Non-Hispanic)	Pop 2010	Pop 2020	% 2010	% 2020
White alone (NH)	120	122	82.19%	81.88%
Black or African American alone (NH)	4	0	2.74%	0.00%
Native American or Alaska Native alone (NH)	9	6	6.16%	4.03%
Asian alone (NH)	0	0	0.00%	0.00%
Native Hawaiian or Pacific Islander alone (NH)	0	2	0.00%	1.34%
Other race alone (NH)	0	4	0.00%	2.68%
Mixed race or Multiracial (NH)	11	4	7.53%	2.68%
Hispanic or Latino (any race)	2	11	1.37%	7.38%
Total	146	149	100.00%	100.00%
