= Reardan-Edwall School District =

School district in Washington, United States

Address
- 215 East Spokane Avenue Reardan, Washington, 99029; United States
- Coordinates: 47°40′01″N 117°52′42″W

District information
- Motto: We promise to be all in to ensure that every student is known, loved, and learning.
- Grades: K—12
- Superintendent: Eric Sobotta
- NCES District ID: 5307210
- Affiliations: Washington State Office of Superintendent of Public Instruction, U.S. Department of Education

Students and staff
- Enrollment: 740 (2023-2024)
- Staff: 43.34 (on an FTE basis)
- Student–teacher ratio: 17.07

Other information
- Website: www.reardan.net

Reardan-Edwall School District is a school district in Washington, headquartered in Reardan. It serves a large section of eastern Lincoln County including the communities of Reardan and Edwall, as well as a section of rural western Spokane County.

Its schools are Reardan Elementary School and Reardan Middle/High School.

== Notable alumni ==
- Sherman Alexie - Reardan High School
