= National Register of Historic Places listings in Pend Oreille County, Washington =

Location of Pend Oreille County in Washington

This list presents the full set of buildings, structures, objects, sites, or districts designated on the National Register of Historic Places in Pend Oreille County, Washington, and offers brief descriptive information about each of them. The National Register recognizes places of national, state, or local historic significance across the United States. Out of over 90,000 National Register sites nationwide, Washington is home to approximately 1,500, and 9 of those are found in Pend Oreille County.

This National Park Service list is complete through NPS recent listings posted March 21, 2025.

== Current listings ==
| | Name on the Register | Image | Date listed | Location | City or town | Description |
|---|---|---|---|---|---|---|
| 1 | Boundary Hydroelectric Project | Boundary Hydroelectric Project | May 1, 2018 (#100002394) | 1198 Boundary Dam Access Rd. 48°59′14″N 117°20′59″W | Metaline vicinity | |
| 2 | Idaho and Wash. Northern RR Bridge | Idaho and Wash. Northern RR Bridge | July 16, 1982 (#82004270) | Spans Pend Oreille River, off WA 31; 48°46′50″N 117°24′33″W | Metaline Falls | Historic Bridges and Tunnels in Washington TR |
| 3 | Lewis P. Larson House | Lewis P. Larson House | March 26, 1979 (#79002549) | 5th and Pend Oreille Blvd. 48°51′48″N 117°22′23″W | Metaline Falls | |
| 4 | Metaline Falls School | Metaline Falls School | September 8, 1988 (#88001518) | 302 Park; 48°51′40″N 117°22′26″W | Metaline Falls | |
| 5 | Pend Oreille County Courthouse | Pend Oreille County Courthouse | December 24, 2013 (#13000997) | 625 W. 4th St. 48°10′41″N 117°02′53″W | Newport | |
| 6 | Pend Oreille Mines and Metals Building | Pend Oreille Mines and Metals Building | August 29, 1997 (#97001081) | 103 S. Grandview St. 48°51′44″N 117°22′18″W | Metaline Falls | |
| 7 | Dr. John and Viola Phillips House and Office | Dr. John and Viola Phillips House and Office | January 3, 2006 (#05001501) | S. 337 Spokane Ave. 48°10′42″N 117°02′45″W | Newport | |
| 8 | United States Border Station | United States Border Station | January 31, 1997 (#96001634) | Roughly bounded by WA 31 and the U.S.-Canada border, Colville National Forest; 48°59′58″N 117°18′00″W | Metaline Falls | |
| 9 | Washington Hotel | Washington Hotel | March 26, 1979 (#79002550) | 5th and Washington St. 48°51′44″N 117°22′08″W | Metaline Falls | |

== See also ==
- National Register of Historic Places listings in Washington state
- Listings in neighboring counties: Bonner, Boundary, Spokane, Stevens
- Historic preservation
- History of Washington (state)
- Index of Washington (state)-related articles
