= National Register of Historic Places listings in Ferry County, Washington =

Location of Ferry County in Washington

This list presents the full set of buildings, structures, objects, sites, or districts designated on the National Register of Historic Places in Ferry County, Washington, and offers brief descriptive information about each of them. The National Register recognizes places of national, state, or local historic significance across the United States. Out of over 90,000 National Register sites nationwide, Washington is home to approximately 1,500, and 13 of those are found partially or wholly in Ferry County.

This National Park Service list is complete through NPS recent listings posted March 21, 2025.

== Current listings ==
	Name on the Register	Image	Date listed	Location	City or town	Description
1	Ansorge Hotel	Ansorge Hotel	March 26, 1979 (#79002530)	River St. and Railroad Ave. 48°53′02″N 118°35′51″W	Curlew	
2	Barstow Bridge		March 30, 1995 (#95000263)	US 395 and Co. Rd. 4061 over the Kettle River; 48°47′05″N 118°07′32″W	Kettle Falls	Bridges of Washington State MPS, also extends into Stevens County. Removed and replaced in 2010.
3	Columbia River Bridge at Kettle Falls	Columbia River Bridge at Kettle Falls	March 28, 1995 (#95000260)	US 395 over the Columbia River; 48°37′34″N 118°07′01″W	Kettle Falls	Bridges of Washington State MPS, also extends into Stevens County
4	Creaser Hotel	Creaser Hotel	April 12, 1982 (#82004211)	664 Church Ln. 48°38′56″N 118°44′01″W	Republic	
5	Curlew Bridge	Curlew Bridge	July 16, 1982 (#82004210)	Spans Kettle River; 48°53′08″N 118°36′01″W	Curlew	Historic Bridges and Tunnels in Washington TR
6	Curlew School	Curlew School	November 28, 1980 (#80003998)	Off WA 4A; 48°52′50″N 118°35′52″W	Curlew	
7	Fairweather-Trevitt House	Fairweather-Trevitt House	August 10, 2000 (#00000975)	645 Kaufman; 48°38′55″N 118°38′25″W	Republic	
8	Ferry County Courthouse	Ferry County Courthouse	May 4, 2018 (#100002404)	350 E Delaware Ave. 48°38′56″N 118°44′05″W	Republic	
9	Kettle Falls District	Kettle Falls District	November 20, 1974 (#74000352)	Address Restricted	Kettle Falls	
10	Orient Bridge	Orient Bridge	July 16, 1982 (#82004297)	Richardson Rd., Spans Kettle River; 48°51′59″N 118°11′52″W	Orient	Historic Bridges and Tunnels in Washington TR, also extends into Stevens County
11	Jesse W. and Elizabeth Slagle House	Jesse W. and Elizabeth Slagle House	May 11, 2011 (#11000279)	912 S. Keller St. 48°38′41″N 118°44′11″W	Republic	
12	U.S. Inspection Station – Ferry, Washington	U.S. Inspection Station – Ferry, Washington	September 10, 2014 (#14000611)	3559 T.B.C. Rd. 49°00′00″N 118°30′13″W	Curlew	
13	U.S. Inspection Station – Laurier, Washington	U.S. Inspection Station – Laurier, Washington	September 10, 2014 (#14000612)	US 395; 48°59′59″N 118°13′27″W	Laurier	

== Former listings ==
	Name on the Register	Image	Date listed	Date removed	Location	City or town	Description
1	Nelson-Grunwell Store	Nelson-Grunwell Store	March 26, 1979 (#79002531)	July 16, 1990	Main and Wall Sts.	Danville	

== See also ==
- National Register of Historic Places listings in Washington state
- Listings in neighboring counties: Lincoln, Okanogan, Stevens
- Historic preservation
- History of Washington (state)
- Index of Washington (state)-related articles
