= Loon Lake, Washington =

Unincorporated community in Washington, United States

- census-designated place
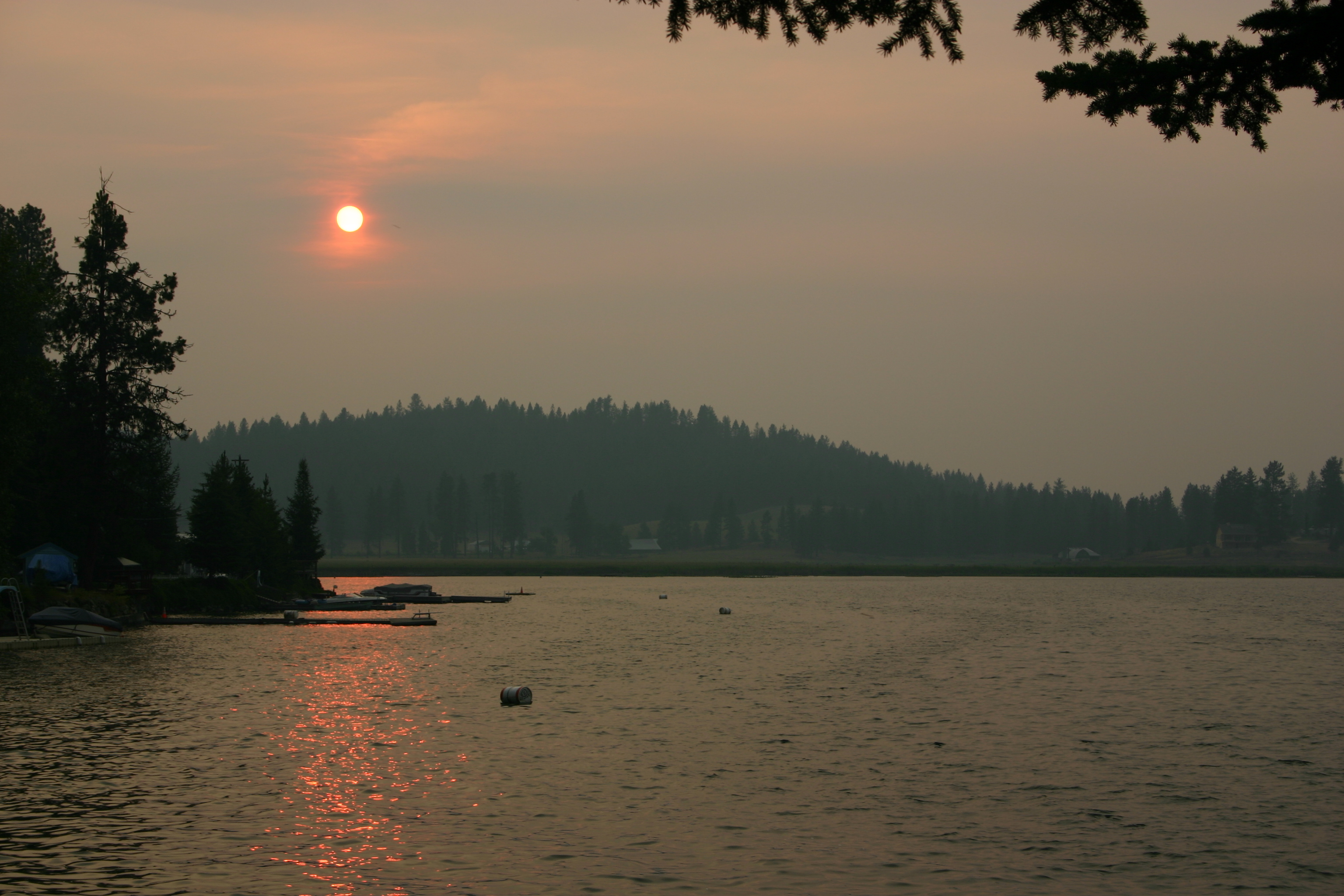
- Sunset over Loon Lake

- Location within Washington (state)
- Coordinates: 48°03′45″N 117°37′22″W
- Country: United States
- State: Washington
- County: Stevens
- Elevation: 2,428 ft (740 m)

Population (April 1, 2020)
  - Total: 898
- Time zone: UTC-8 (Pacific (PST))
  - Summer (DST): UTC-7 (PDT)
- ZIP code: 99148
- Area code: 509
- GNIS feature ID: 2586737

Loon Lake is an unincorporated community and census-designated place in Stevens County, Washington, United States. Loon Lake is located on the northern shore of Loon Lake 5 miles (8.0 km) east of Springdale. The community is served by U.S. Route 395 and Washington State Route 292. Loon Lake has a post office with ZIP code 99148.

== Demographics ==
Historical population
Census	Pop.	Note	%±
2010	783		—
2020	898		14.7%
U.S. Decennial Census; 2000 2010

Addy first appeared as a census designated place in the 2010 U.S. census.

=== Racial and ethnic composition ===
Loon Lake CDP, Washington – Racial and ethnic composition Note: the US Census treats Hispanic/Latino as an ethnic category. This table excludes Latinos from the racial categories and assigns them to a separate category. Hispanics/Latinos may be of any race.
Race / Ethnicity (NH = Non-Hispanic)	Pop 2010	Pop 2020	% 2010	% 2020
White alone (NH)	726	777	92.72%	86.53%
Black or African American alone (NH)	3	4	0.38%	0.45%
Native American or Alaska Native alone (NH)	17	15	2.17%	1.67%
Asian alone (NH)	1	5	0.13%	0.56%
Native Hawaiian or Pacific Islander alone (NH)	0	0	0.00%	0.00%
Other race alone (NH)	0	5	0.00%	0.56%
Mixed race or Multiracial (NH)	22	48	2.81%	5.35%
Hispanic or Latino (any race)	14	44	1.79%	4.90%
Total	783	898	100.00%	100.00%

=== 2020 census ===
As of the 2020 census, Loon Lake had a population of 898.
