= Little Falls Hydroelectric Power Plant =

- U.S. National Register of Historic Places
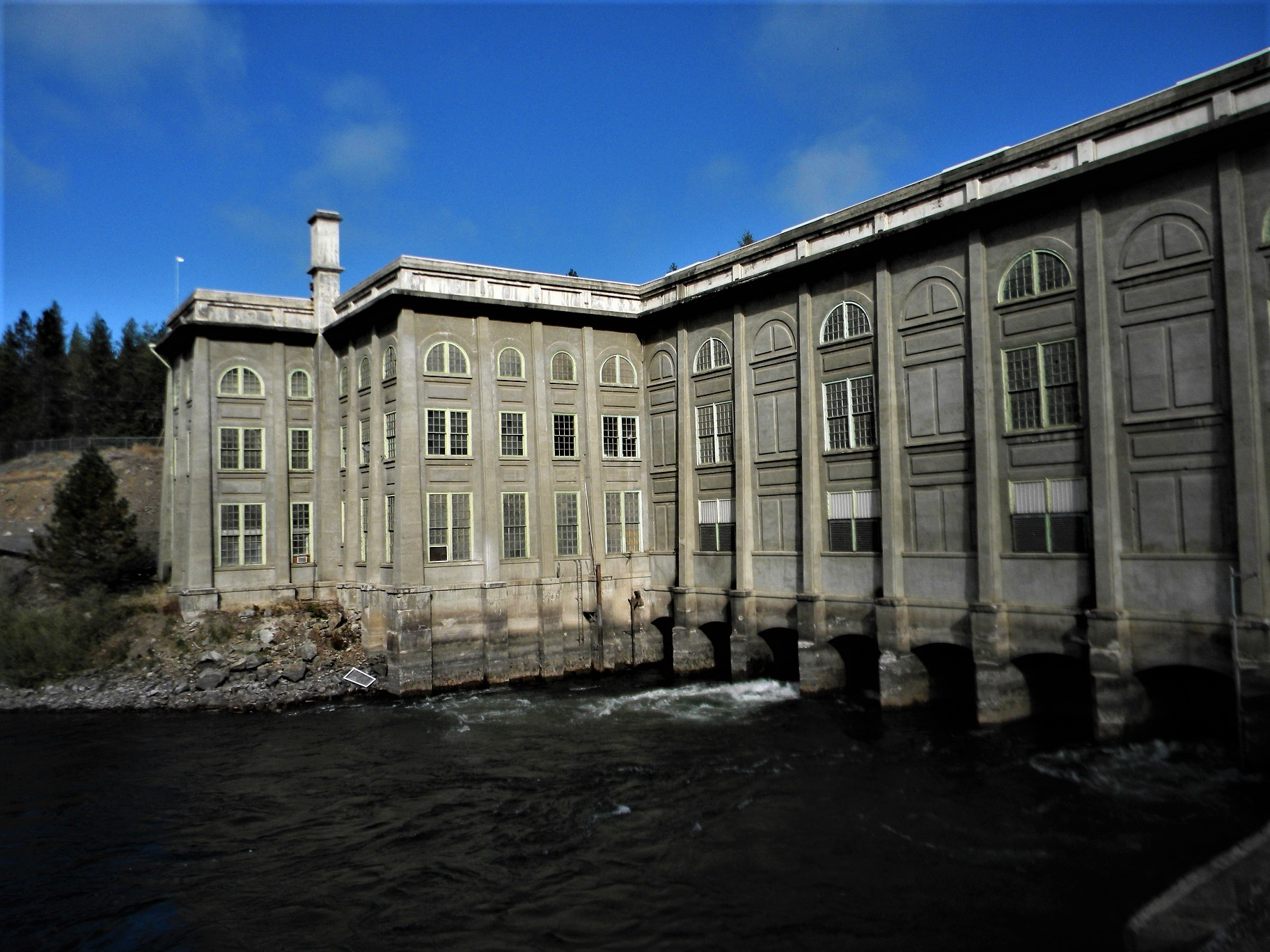

- Location within Washington (state) Location within the United States
- Nearest city: Reardan, Washington
- Coordinates: 47°49′53″N 117°55′00″W
- Area: 12 acres (4.9 ha)
- Built: 1907-10
- Built by: Washington Water Power Co.
- Architectural style: Classical Revival, Neoclassical
- MPS: Hydroelectric Power Plants in Washington State, 1890--1938 MPS
- NRHP reference No.: 88002737
- Added to NRHP: December 15, 1988

The Little Falls Hydroelectric Power Plant, on the Spokane River near Reardan, Washington, about 30 miles (48 km) west of Spokane was built during 1907–10. It was listed on the National Register of Historic Places in 1988. The listing included one contributing building and seven contributing structures on 12 acres (4.9 ha). The area spans the border of Lincoln County, Washington and Stevens County, Washington.

It includes a 1,716 feet (523 m) dam.

It was described as "a significant low head hydroelectric installation from the early 20th century. Built in 1907-1910, the plant was the first large-scale regional generating facility constructed by the Washington Water Power Company. As such, the plant was critical to the growth of industry and agriculture in the Inland Empire. In addition, the powerhouse is an architecturally significant example of industrial design from the period."

== Gallery ==
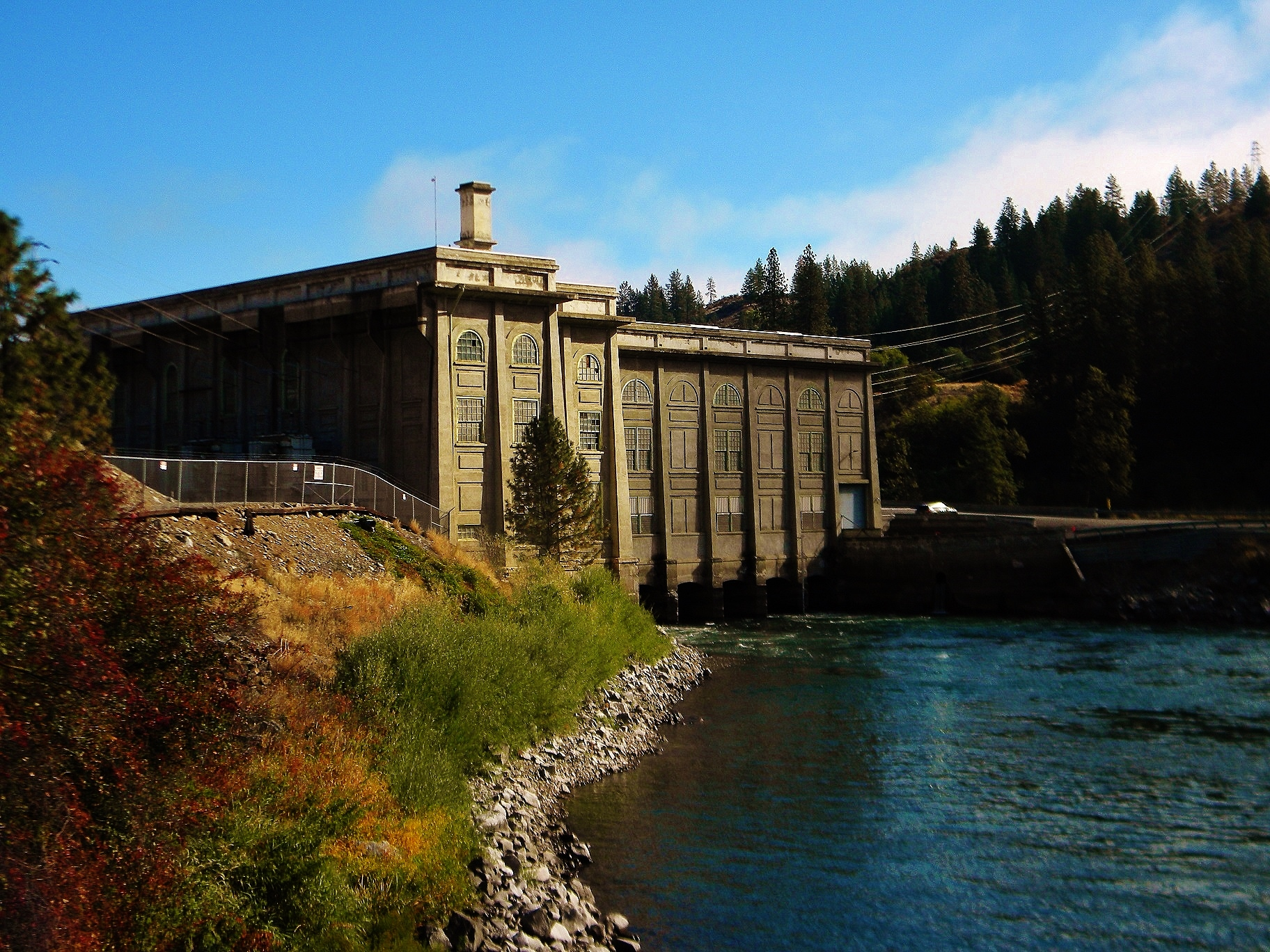
View from the Stevens County side

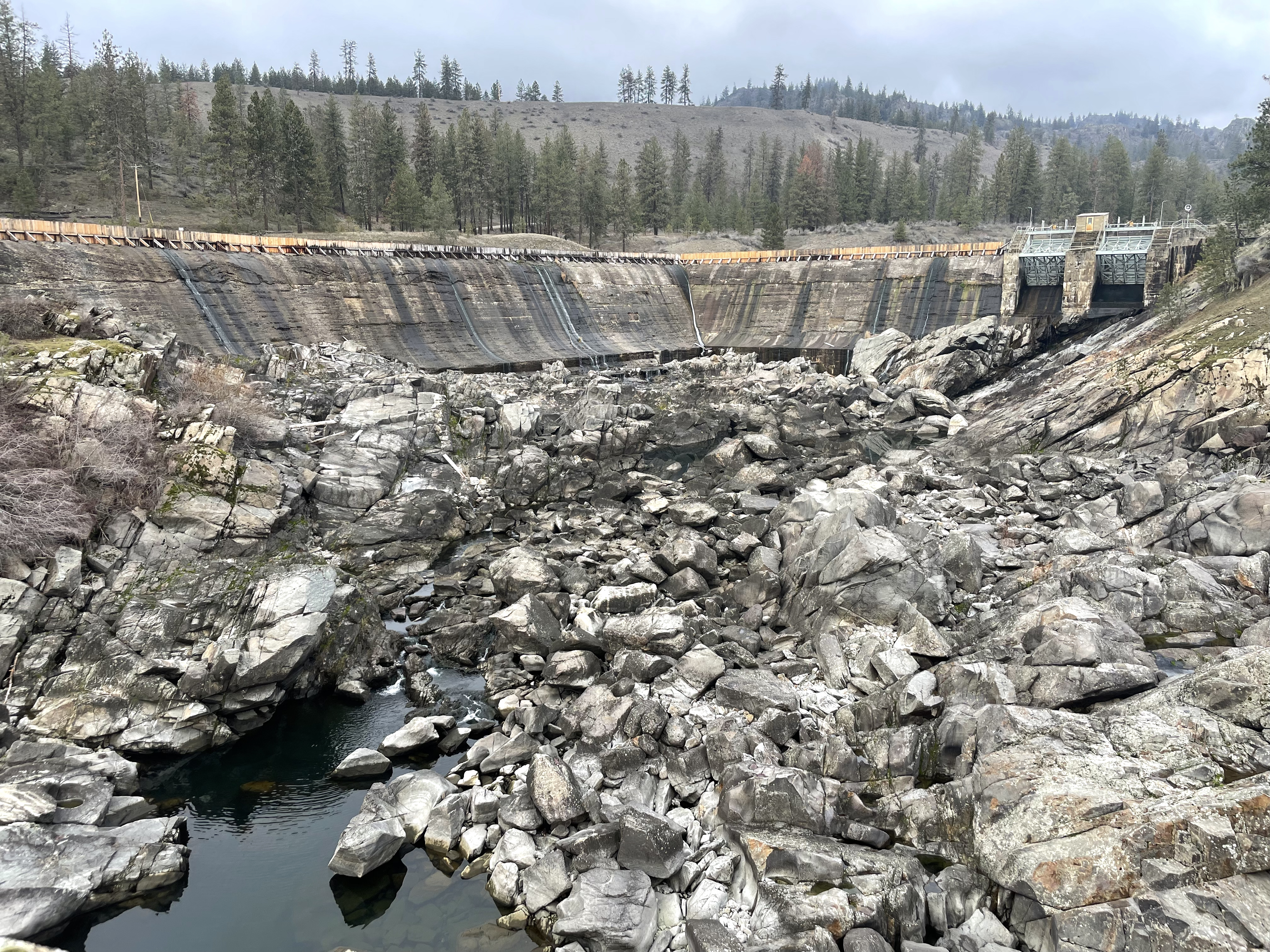
The dam at the facility

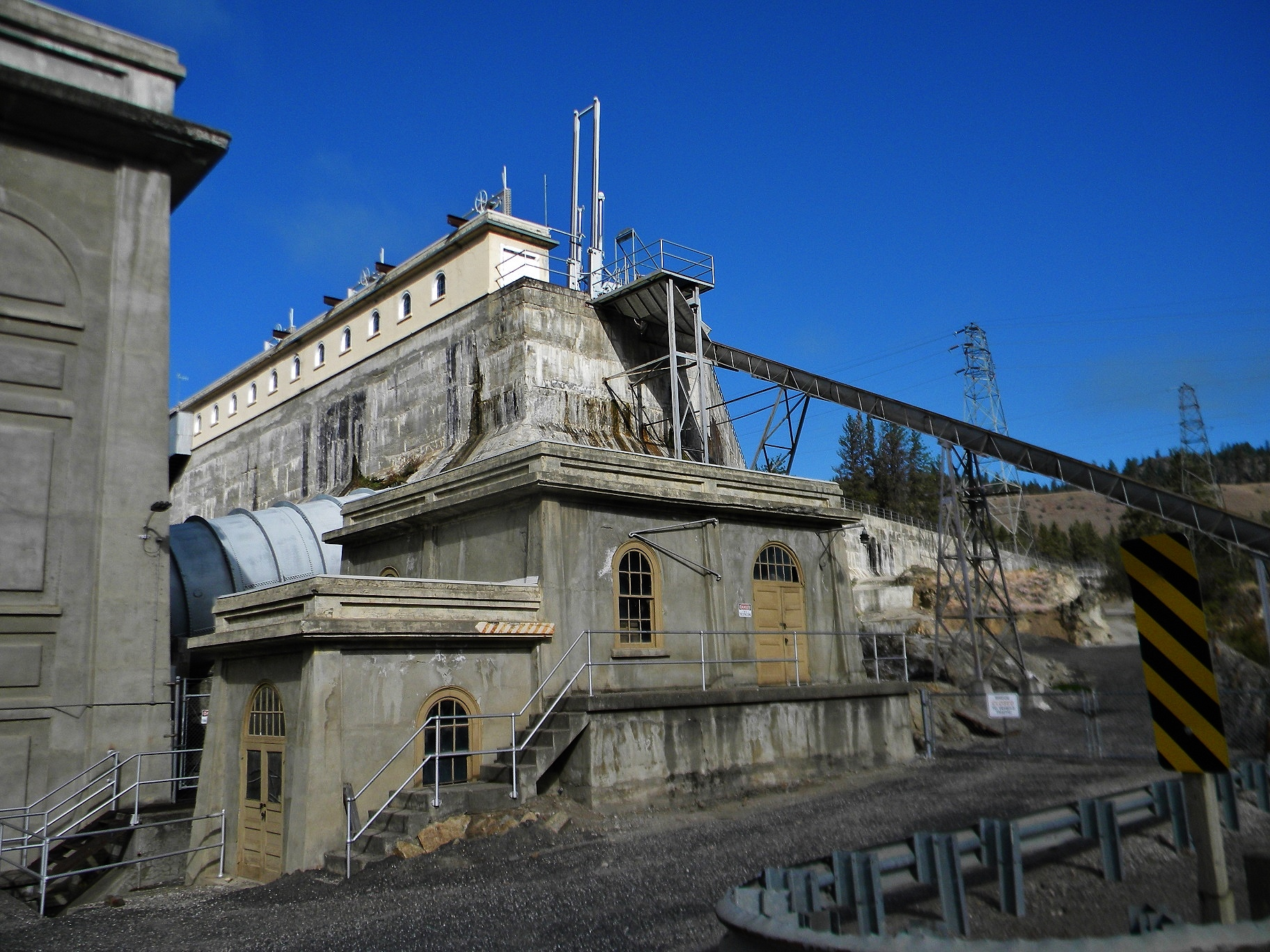
The main facility building

== See also ==
- Long Lake Hydroelectric Power Plant, also built by the Washington Water Power Co. on the Spokane River and NRHP-listed
