= Edwall, Washington =

Unincorporated community in Washington, United States

- Unincorporated community
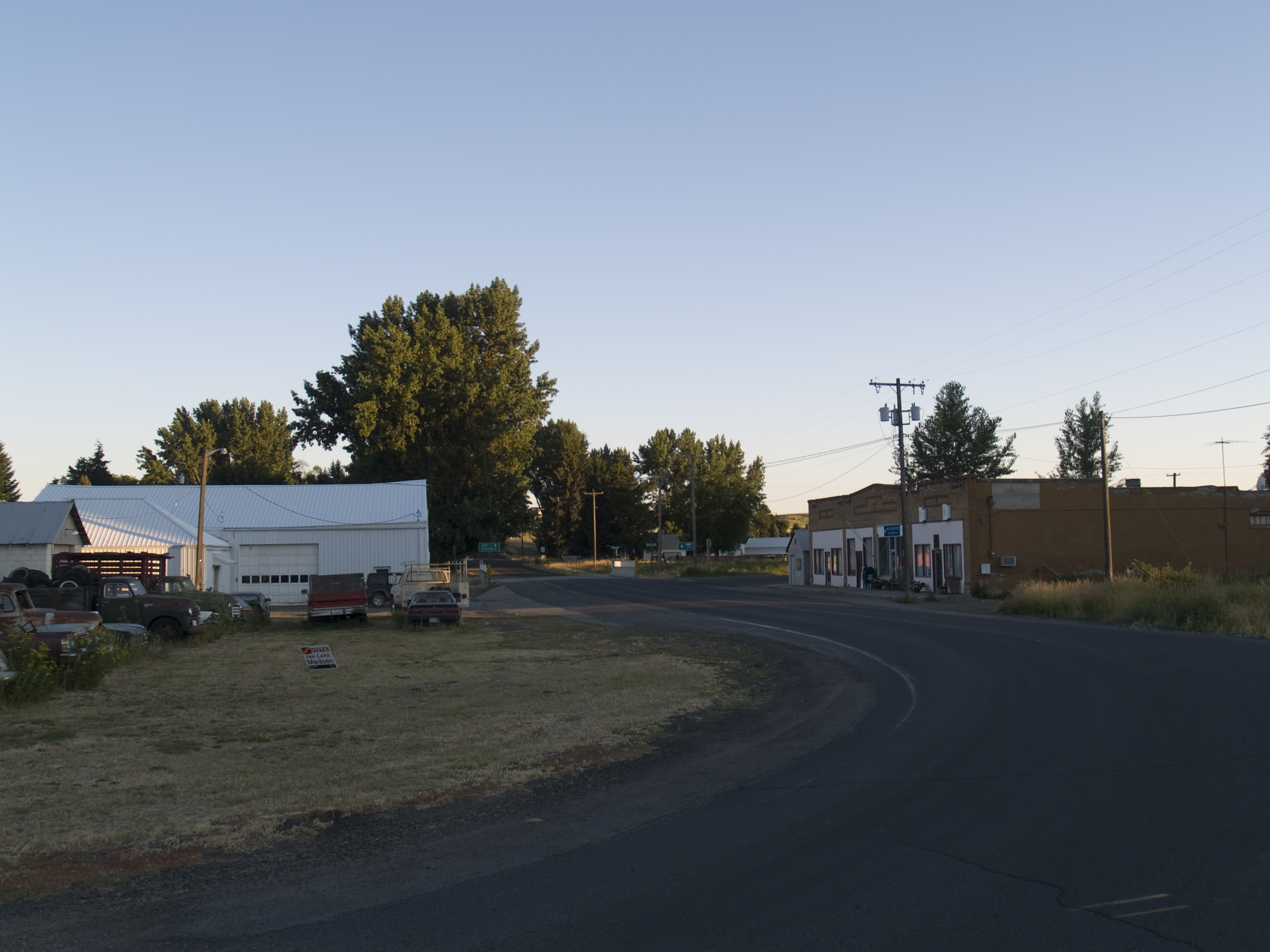
- Edwall in 2008

- Location within Washington (state) Location within the United States
- Coordinates: 47°30′18.8″N 117°56′57.5″W
- Country: United States
- State: Washington
- County: Lincoln
- Elevation: 2,323 ft (708 m)
- Time zone: UTC-8 (Pacific (PST))
  - Summer (DST): UTC-7 (PDT)
- ZIP codes: 99008
- Area code: 509
- GNIS feature ID: 1512181

Edwall is a small unincorporated community located about 35 miles from the city of Spokane in Lincoln County, Washington, United States. Edwall is part of the Reardan-Edwall School District. The former Edwall School is now owned by the Parks and Recreation District and leased to Christian Heritage School, a private non-denominational school. In February 2014 record rain caused the small Creek to overflow and flood the center of town and causing permanent damage and closure to Edwall's post office. Edwall also has an active United Methodist Church congregation, Men's Service Club, Women in Action Committee, volunteer fire/emergency medical crew, and a volunteer-run library located in the original one-room wood-frame schoolhouse.

== History ==
Peter Edwall was the first white man to settle in the area in 1881, where he began a ranch. He was followed by William Spence, from Medical Lake, who homesteaded on the site of the future town. Mr. Edwall bought Spence's land in 1887. When the Great Northern Railway laid its main line across his land in 1892, Edwall platted a town site and named it after himself.

Edwall's first buildings were constructed by the railroad and included a depot, water tank and other small storage buildings. These were soon followed by a church and a general store in 1893. Growth between The Panic of 1893 and 1897 was slow. In 1897, following a bountiful wheat harvest that boosted Lincoln County's economy, Edwall experienced a boom. A newspaper and bank were soon established as well as a large hotel and the population by 1903 had reached 275.

== Education ==
Reardan-Edwall School District serves Edwall.

== Notable people ==
- Bill Moos, athletic director at the University of Nebraska–Lincoln
- Wendy Ward, professional golfer.
