= Miles, Washington =

Unincorporated community in Washington, United States

- Unincorporated community
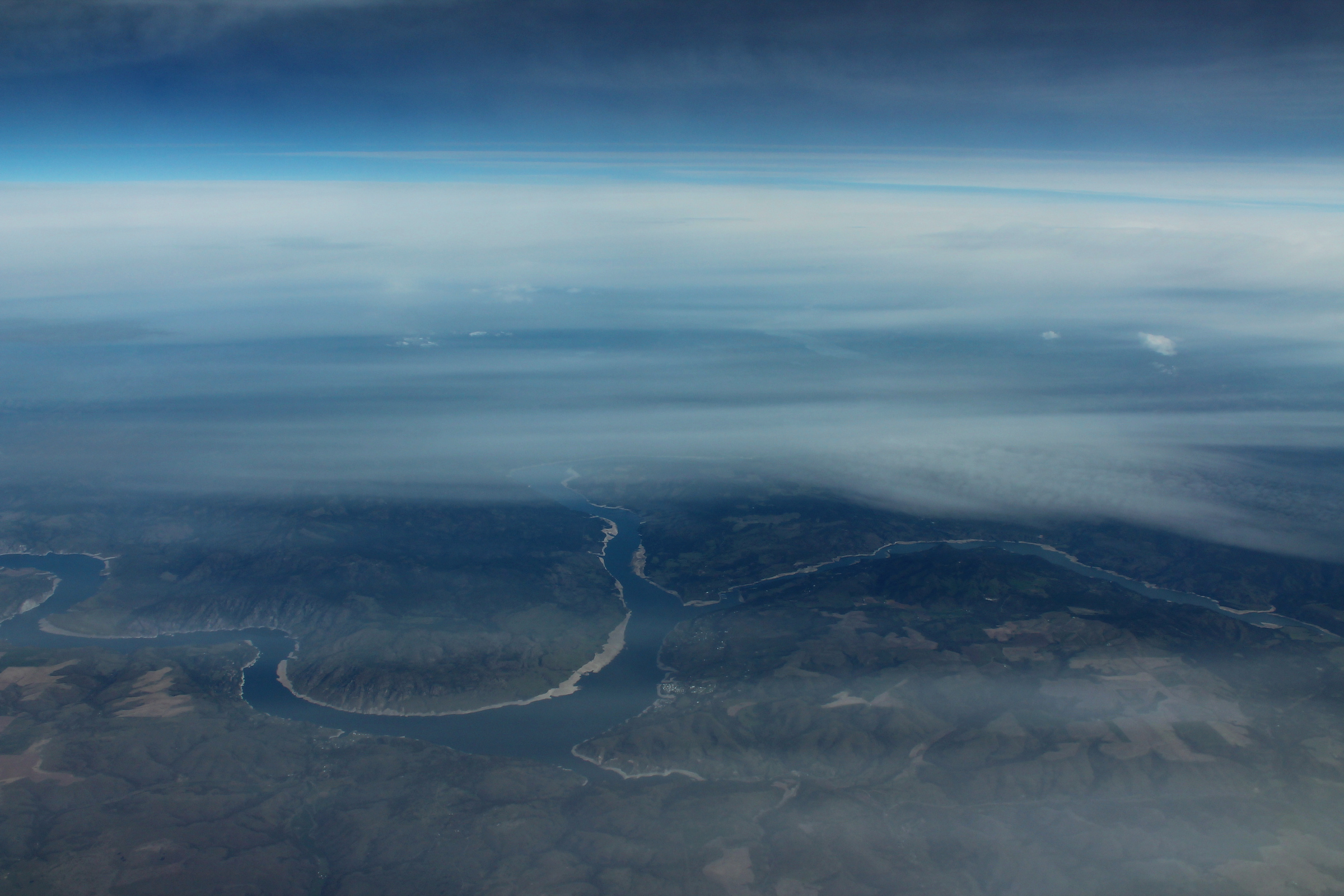
- Aerial view of the area

- Location within Washington (state)
- Coordinates: 47°54′39″N 118°17′33″W
- Country: United States
- State: Washington
- County: Lincoln
- Elevation: 1,440 ft (440 m)
- Time zone: UTC-8 (Pacific (PST))
  - Summer (DST): UTC-7 (PDT)
- ZIP code: 99122
- Area code: 509
- GNIS feature ID: 1512464

Miles is an unincorporated community in Lincoln County, in the U.S. state of Washington. It is located adjacent to Fort Spokane where the Spokane River empties into the Columbia River.

== History ==
A post office called Miles was in operation from 1881 until 1962. The community was named after Gen. Nelson A. Miles. The post office was the address of Fort Spokane.
