= Post Falls Dam =

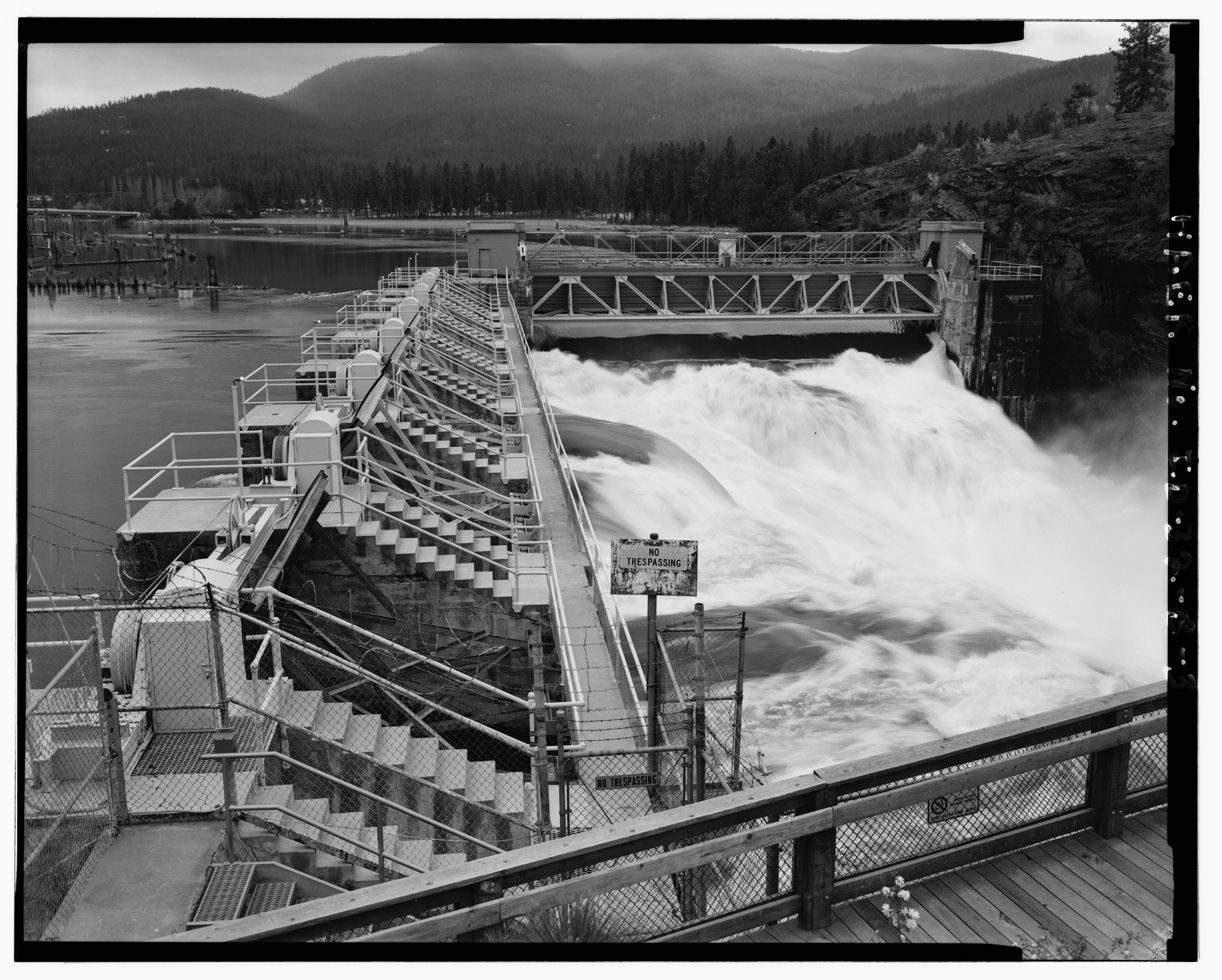
- North Channel Dam spillway
- Interactive map of Post Falls Dam
- Official name: Post Falls Middle Dam, Post Falls North Dam, Post Falls South Dam
- Location: Kooteani County, Idaho
- Coordinates: 47.7072449°N 116.9621865°W
- Opening date: 1906
- Owner: Avista

Dam and spillways
- Type of dam: Concrete gravity
- Impounds: Spokane River

Reservoir
- Creates: Controls Coeur d'Alene Lake

Power Station
- Turbines: 6
- Installed capacity: 14.75 MW

Post Falls Dam is a dam on the Spokane River in the city of Post Falls, Idaho. The current dam was constructed in 1906 on the site of an older wooden dam that was used to power a sawmill. Post Falls Dam is commonly referred to in the singular, but the facility actually contains three dams (Post Falls Middle Dam, Post Falls North Dam, and Post Falls South Dam) spanning three channels of the Spokane River as it navigates around the Avista Islands. It is the most-upstream dam on the Spokane River, just nine miles from its source at Coeur d'Alene Lake, and the first of seven total dams on the Spokane River.

== History ==
The site of the Post Falls Dam was previously home to a 20-foot wooden diversion dam built by pioneer settler and namesake of Post Falls, Frederick Post, who purchased the land from Chief Andrew Seltice of the Coeur d'Alene Tribe for $500 in 1871. Post built his original dam to power a sawmill on the north channel of the river. The sawmill burned down in 1902 and the site was sold to Washington Water Power, now known as Avista, which began construction on the three dams for hydroelectric power generation. The powerhouse, located on the central channel, was completed in 1906.

Since the 1990s, the north bank of the river alongside the north channel dam has been open to the public as Falls Park, owned by the City of Post Falls. The park provides interpretive information on the history of the site and views of the north channel dam and spillways.

== Dams ==
Of the three dams at the site, the middle channel with the powerhouse is the only one that generates electricity. It measures 431 feet long by 31 feet tall and occupies the deepest and most confined gorge of the three channels passing around the islands. The north channel dam is L-shaped with one large sluice and eight smaller sluices on the other arm of the L-shape. The south channel dam measures 78 feet long with 13 foot high gates used to control spring water flows.

== Gallery ==
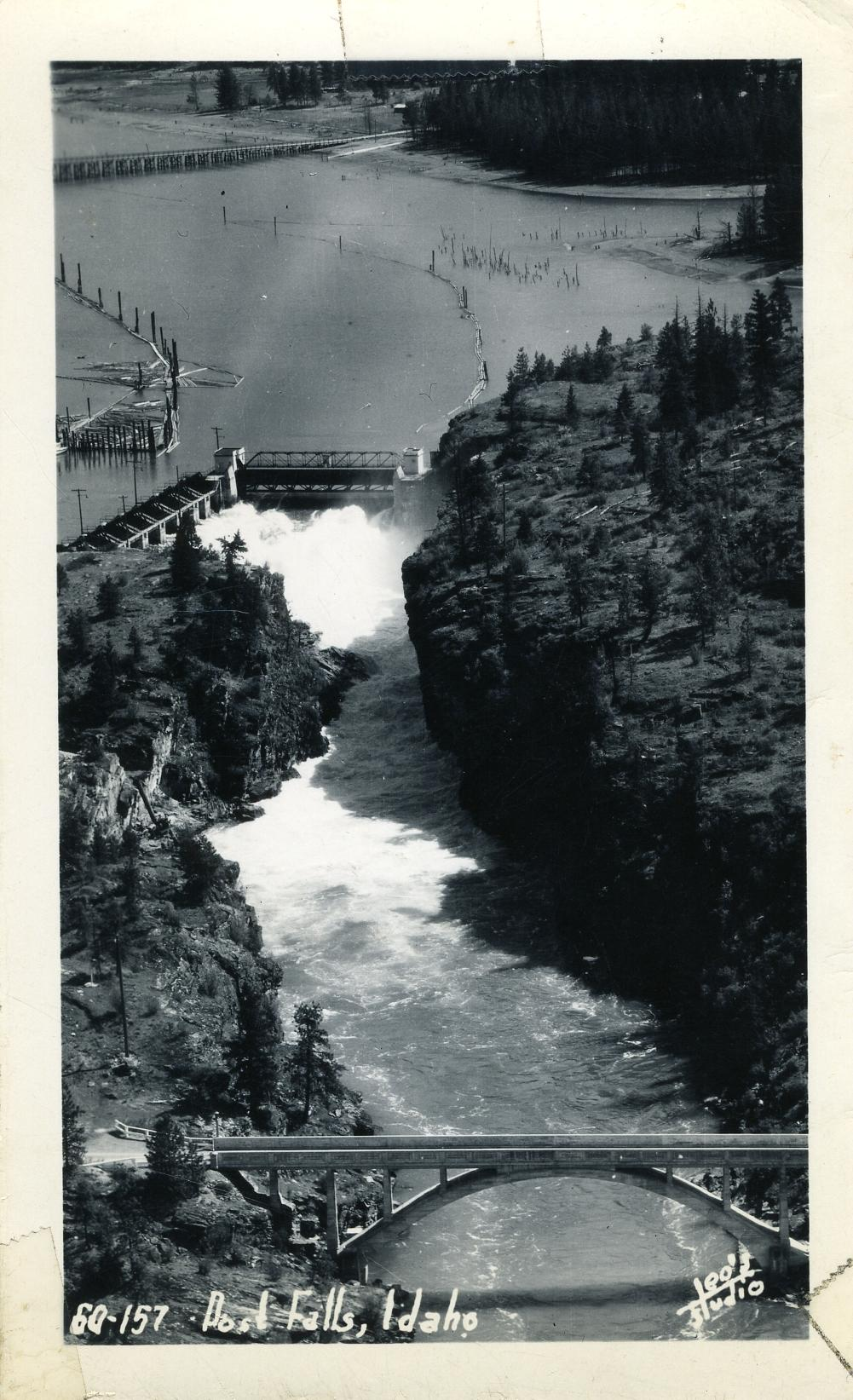
North Channel Dam

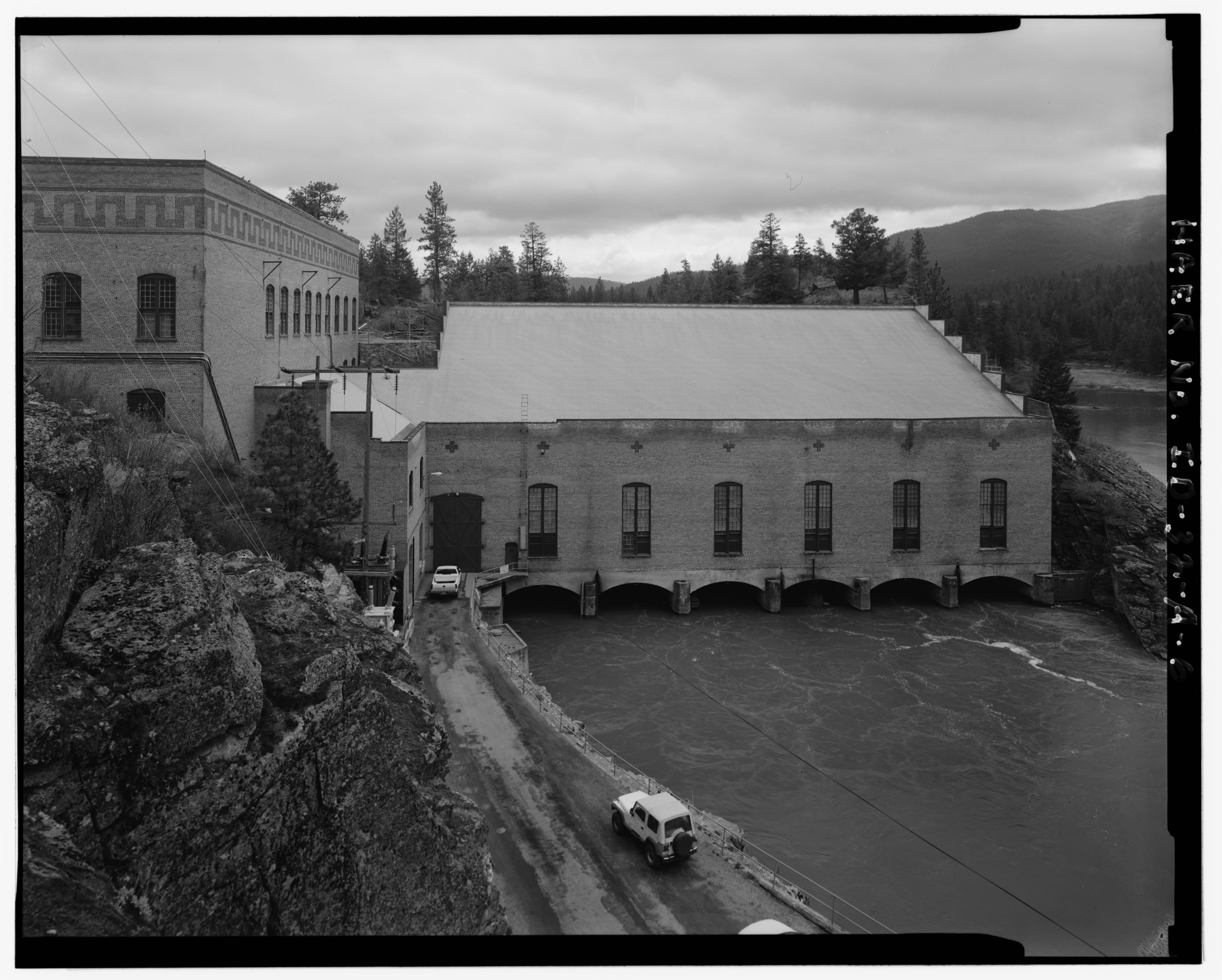
Middle Channel dam and powerhouse

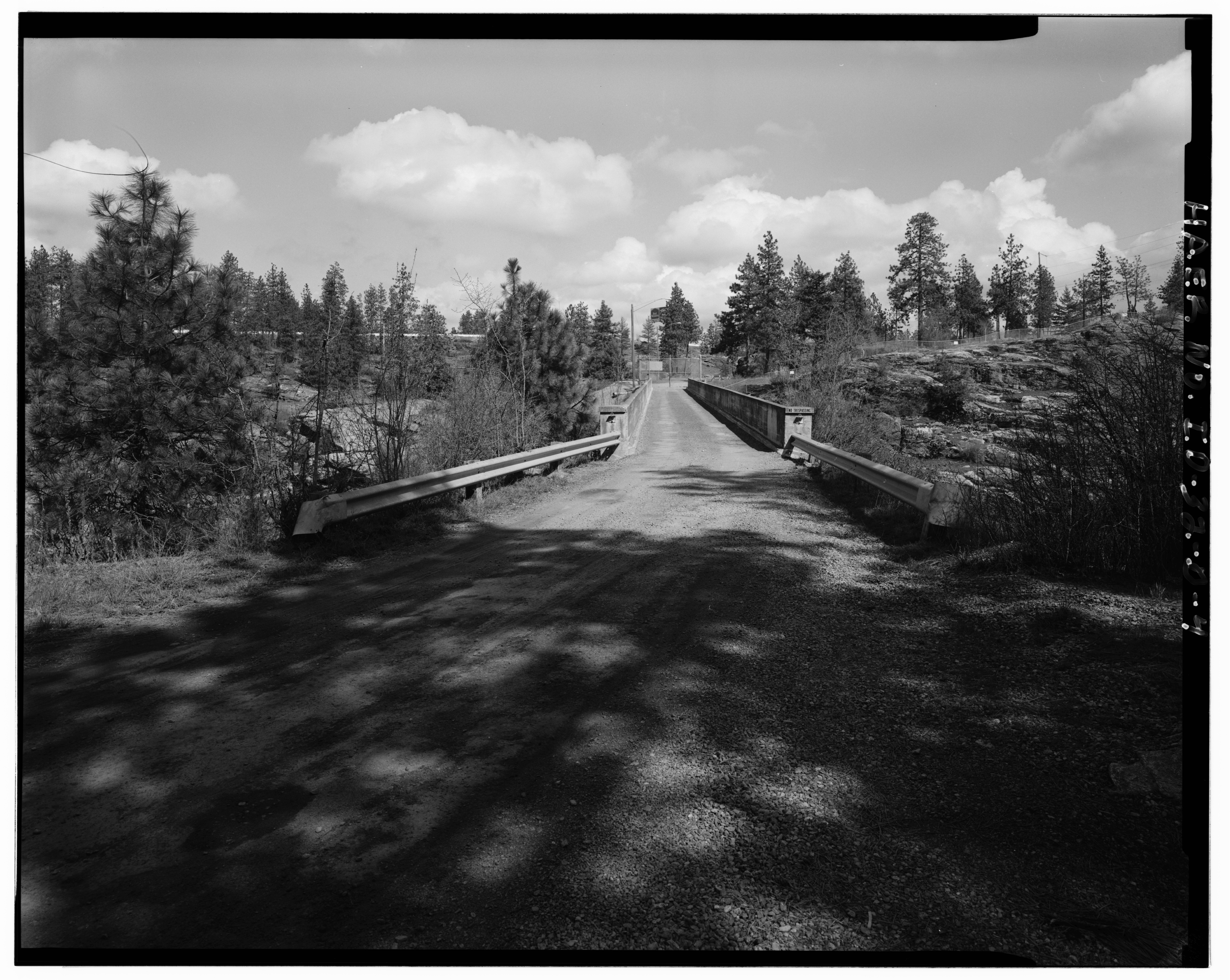
Bridge connecting Middle Channel Island (foreground) to the north bank

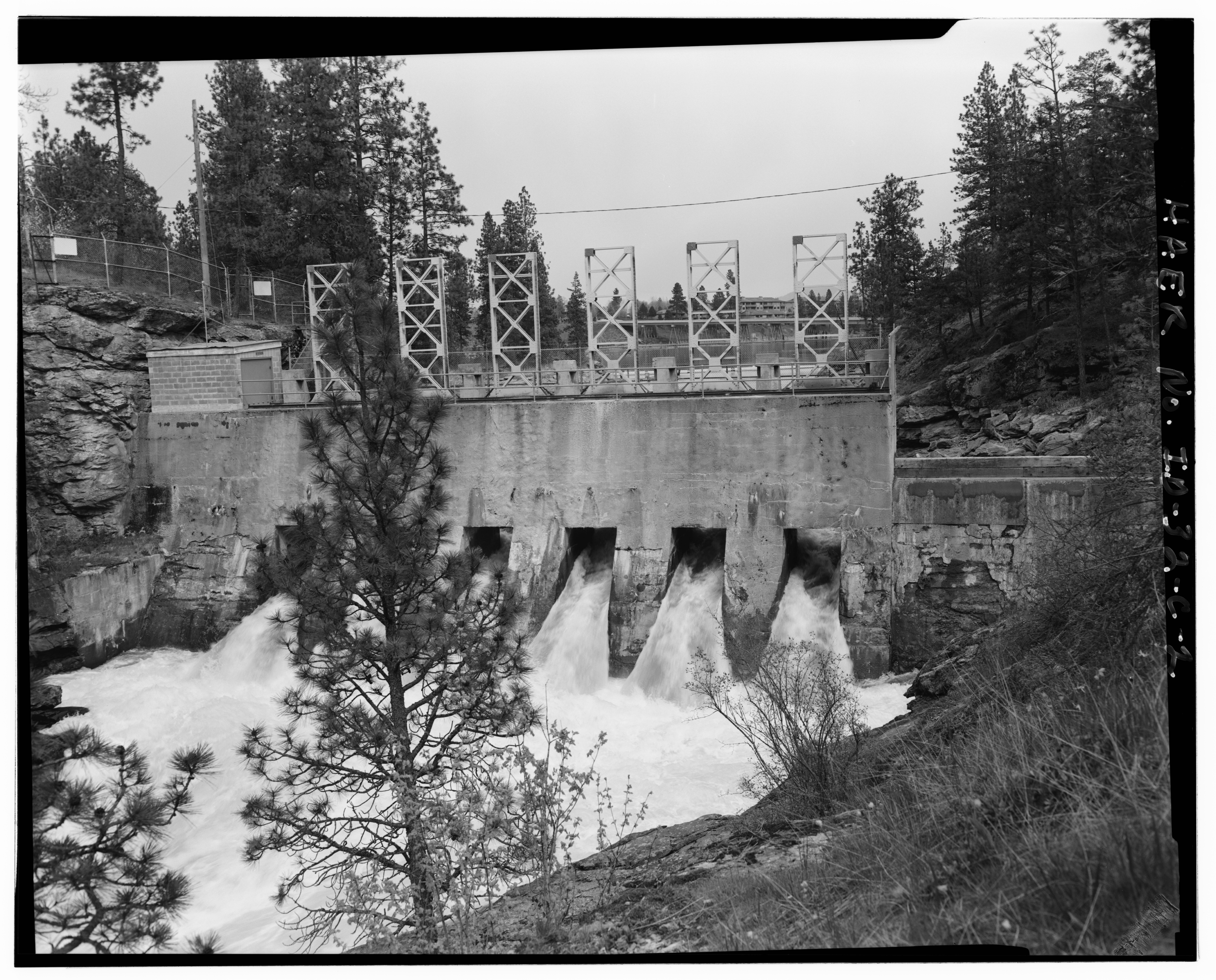
South Channel Dam

== See also ==
- List of dams in the Columbia River watershed
