= Loon Lake (Washington) =

Lake in Stevens County, Washington, USA

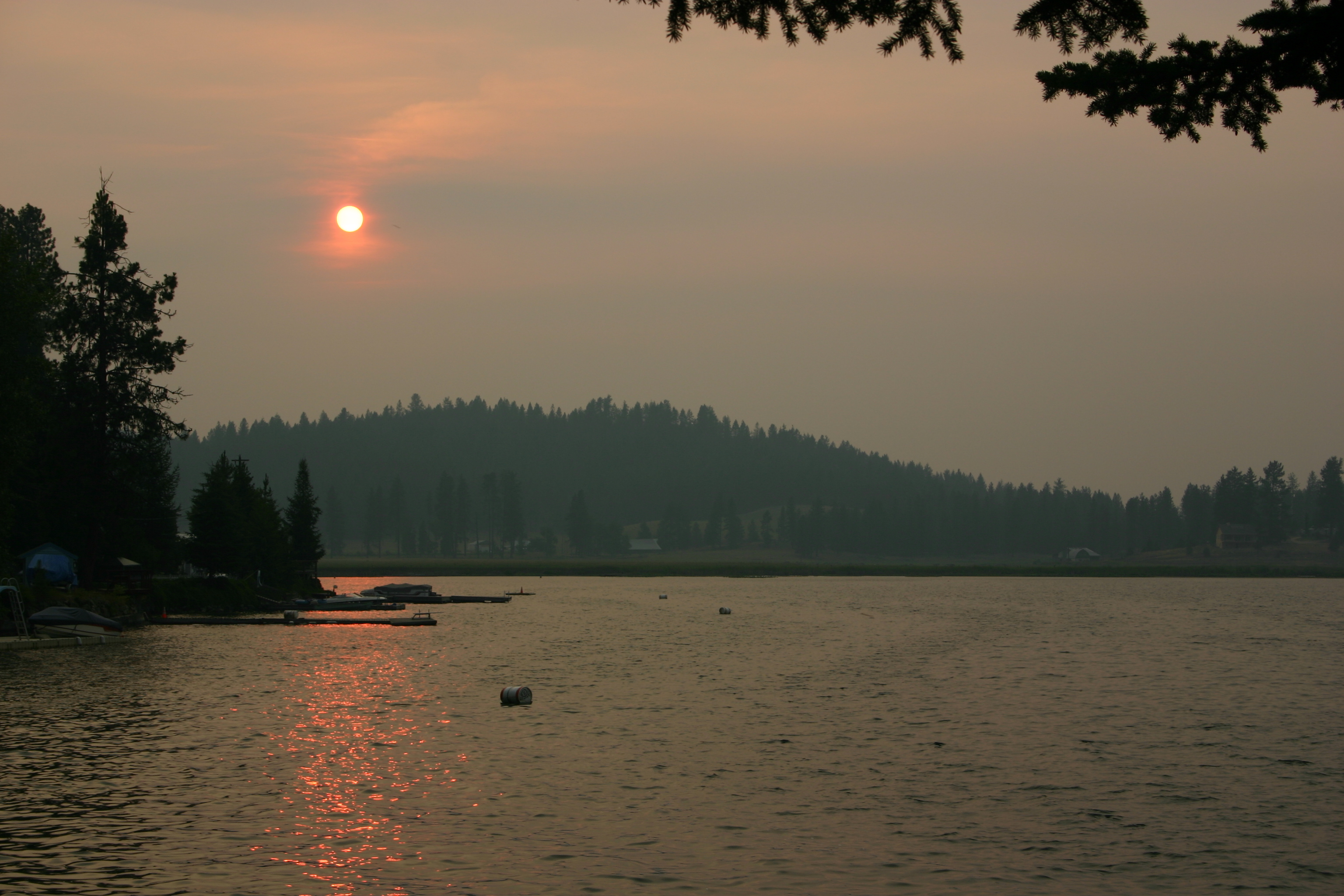
- Sunset

- Location within Washington (state) Location within the United States
- Location: Stevens County, Washington
- Coordinates: 48.047639°N 117.623749°W
- Type: Oligotrophic
- Primary inflows: 5 unnamed inflows
- Primary outflows: Sheep Creek
- Catchment area: 9,024 acres (3,652 ha)
- Basin countries: United States
- Max. length: 2.2 mi (3.5 km)
- Max. width: 1.0 mi (1.6 km)
- Surface area: 1,100 acres (450 ha)
- Average depth: 46 ft (14 m)
- Max. depth: 100 ft (30 m)
- Water volume: 50,600 acre⋅ft (62,400,000 m^{3})
- Surface elevation: 2,385 ft (727 m)

Loon Lake is a 1,100-acre (450 ha) lake located in Stevens County, Washington, 30 miles (48 km) north-northwest of Spokane, Washington at an elevation of 726 metres (2,382 ft). The lake is about two miles wide, one mile long, and has a maximum depth of 100 feet (30 m).

Loon Lake was named for the wild loons near the water.

== Details ==
Loon Lake is a popular destination for water-based recreation including swimming, fishing, boating, kayaking, sailing, water skiing and jet-skiing. Its shores are lined with numerous homes. These homes are a mix of full time residents and part time vacation use. Loon Lake has one public access point.

An unofficial boat parade occurs every 4th of July, wherein lake residents and visitors decorate their boats and move in procession around the edge of the lake.

The town of Loon Lake, Washington lies immediately to the north of the lake.

== See also ==
- List of lakes in Washington
