= Reardan, Washington =

Reardan
- Town
- Reardan, Washington
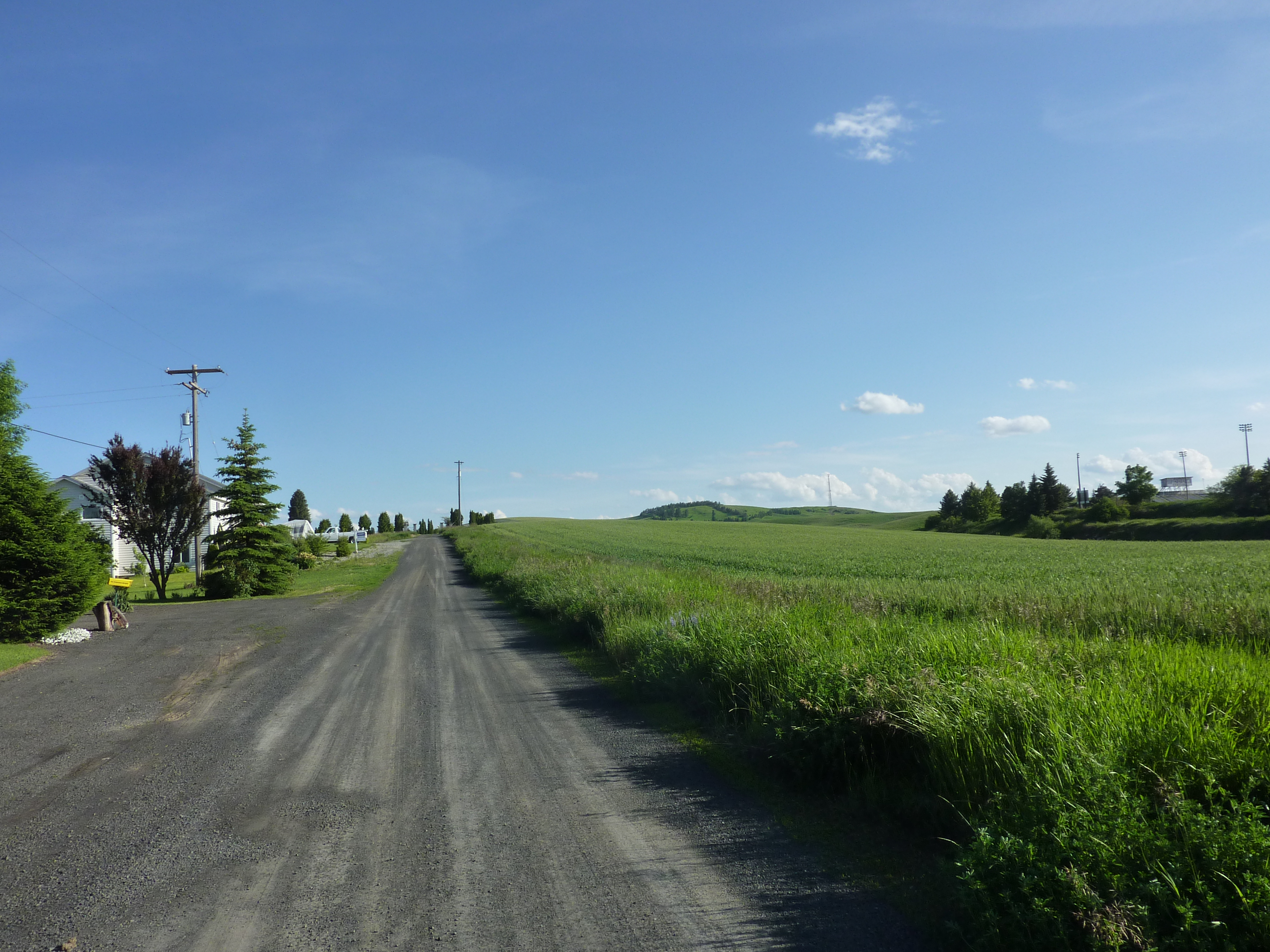
- Spring in Reardan

- Location of Reardan, Washington
- Coordinates: 47°40′9″N 117°52′42″W
- Country: United States
- State: Washington
- County: Lincoln

Government
  - Type: Mayor–council
  - Mayor: Gail Daniels

Area
  - Total: 0.50 sq mi (1.30 km^{2})
  - Land: 0.50 sq mi (1.29 km^{2})
  - Water: 0.0039 sq mi (0.01 km^{2})
- Elevation: 2,513 ft (766 m)

Population (2020)
  - Total: 637
  - Density: 1,229.1/sq mi (474.56/km^{2})
- Time zone: UTC-8 (Pacific (PST))
  - Summer (DST): UTC-7 (PDT)
- ZIP code: 99029
- Area code: 509
- FIPS code: 53-57465
- GNIS feature ID: 1507746
- Website: reardanwa.gov

Reardan is a town in Lincoln County, Washington, United States. The population was 637 at the 2020 census.

== History ==
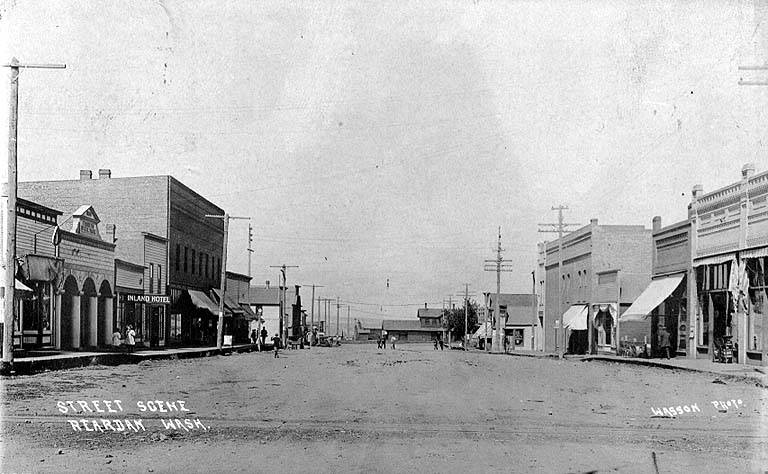
Reardan, Washington, ca 1910

Founded in 1882 and platted in 1889, Reardan was named for Central Washington Railroad engineer C.F. Reardan. Reardan was incorporated on April 14, 1903.

The town is home to the elementary/middle/high school serving the Reardan-Edwall School District, covering over 360 square miles (930 km^{2}) in Lincoln and Spokane counties. The slough north of town, known as Audubon Lake, is well known among birders as a busy stop on the Pacific Flyway and features public facilities for viewers. A Hutterite colony settled in the area in 1961.

Mule Days has been celebrated on the first Saturday in June for over 50, featuring a Kiddie Parade, Main Parade, entertainment and games for kids at the park, three on three basketball in front of the high school, food and craft fair at the park, Community BBQ pork luncheon, Beer Garden, and Mule Days Dance.

== Geography ==
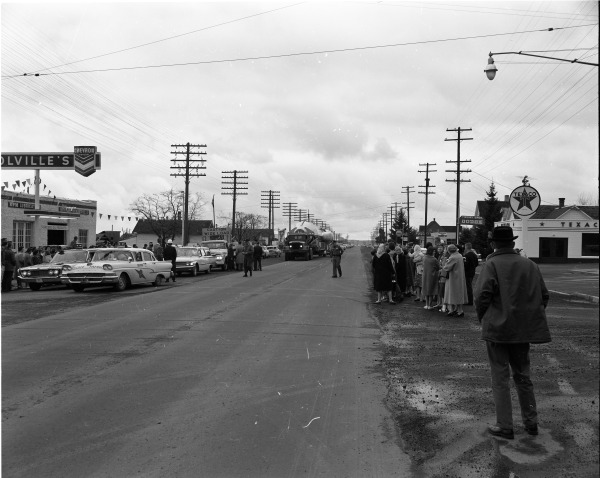
An Atlas rocket passing through Reardan to a nearby silo in 1961

According to the United States Census Bureau, the town has a total area of 0.50 square miles (1.29 km^{2}), of which, 0.49 square miles (1.27 km^{2}) is land and 0.01 square miles (0.03 km^{2}) is water.

U.S. Route 2 runs through Reardan, where it is also known as Broadway Avenue and serves as the town's main street. The highway connects Reardan with Spokane, the region's big city, 22 miles to the east, and Davenport, the county seat, 13 miles to the west. Washington State Route 231, a north–south route, also runs through the town. The Washington Eastern Railroad runs through town on its route from Cheney to Coulee City.

Reardan is located on the divide between the Columbia and Spokane river drainage basins. Audubon Lake, on the northern side of town, is the headwaters of Crab Creek, which flows southwest for 163 miles before emptying into the Columbia. The lake and surrounding wetlands also drain into Deep Creek, which empties into the Spokane roughly 16 miles as the crow flies northeast of the lake. Spring Creek also rises from the Audubon Lake wetlands and flows north into the Spokane River just downstream from Long Lake Dam. State Route 231 follows Spring Creek north from town.

== Demographics ==
Historical population
Census	Pop.	Note	%±
1910	527		—
1920	420		−20.3%
1930	422		0.5%
1940	422		0.0%
1950	410		−2.8%
1960	474		15.6%
1970	389		−17.9%
1980	498		28.0%
1990	482		−3.2%
2000	608		26.1%
2010	571		−6.1%
2020	637		11.6%
U.S. Decennial Census

=== 2010 census ===
As of the 2010 census, there were 571 people, 240 households, and 160 families living in the town. The population density was 1,165.3 inhabitants per square mile (449.9/km^{2}). There were 255 housing units at an average density of 520.4 per square mile (200.9/km^{2}). The racial makeup of the town was 92.5% White, 0.5% African American, 4.7% Native American, 0.4% Asian, and 1.9% from two or more races. Hispanic or Latino of any race were 2.5% of the population.

There were 240 households, of which 30.0% had children under the age of 18 living with them, 49.6% were married couples living together, 13.8% had a female householder with no husband present, 3.3% had a male householder with no wife present, and 33.3% were non-families. 29.2% of all households were made up of individuals, and 10.9% had someone living alone who was 65 of age or older. The average household size was 2.38 and the average family size was 2.88.

The median age in the town was 43.2 . 24.7% of residents were under the age of 18; 5.5% were between the ages of 18 and 24; 21.6% were from 25 to 44; 32.6% were from 45 to 64; and 15.8% were 65 of age or older. The gender makeup of the town was 47.3% male and 52.7% female.

=== 2000 census ===
As of the 2000 census, there were 608 people, 227 households, and 174 families living in the town. The population density was 1,285.2 people per square mile (499.5/km^{2}). There were 242 housing units at an average density of 511.6 per square mile (198.8/km^{2}). The racial makeup of the town was 93.91% White, 0.16% African American, 2.30% Native American, 0.66% Pacific Islander, 0.16% from other races, and 2.80% from two or more races. Hispanic or Latino of any race were 1.32% of the population.

There were 227 households, out of which 33.9% had children under the age of 18 living with them, 59.5% were married couples living together, 11.9% had a female householder with no husband present, and 23.3% were non-families. 21.6% of all households were made up of individuals, and 6.2% had someone living alone who was 65 of age or older. The average household size was 2.68 and the average family size was 3.06.

In the town, the population was spread out, with 28.9% under the age of 18, 8.1% from 18 to 24, 24.7% from 25 to 44, 26.6% from 45 to 64, and 11.7% who were 65 of age or older. The median age was 37 . For every 100 females, there were 101.3 males. For every 100 females age 18 and over, there were 92.9 males.

The median income for a household in the town was $38,750, and the median income for a family was $44,167. Males had a median income of $32,279 versus $21,429 for females. The per capita income for the town was $18,610. About 7.3% of families and 7.4% of the population were below the poverty line, including 12.8% of those under age 18 and none of those age 65 or over.

== Famous connections ==
Famous Indigenous American writer Sherman Alexie attended Reardan High School, which is featured in a few of his stories and in his 2007 novel for young adults, The Absolutely True Diary of a Part-Time Indian.

World War II Medal of Honor recipient PFC Joe E. Mann was born July 8, 1922, in Reardan and was killed in action, September 19, 1944, in Best, Netherlands. He was a soldier assigned to the 502nd PIR, 101st Airborne Division.

== Education ==
Reardan is within the Reardan-Edwall School District.

The Inland Northwest Rail Museum opened in Reardan in 2016.
