= Long Lake Dam =

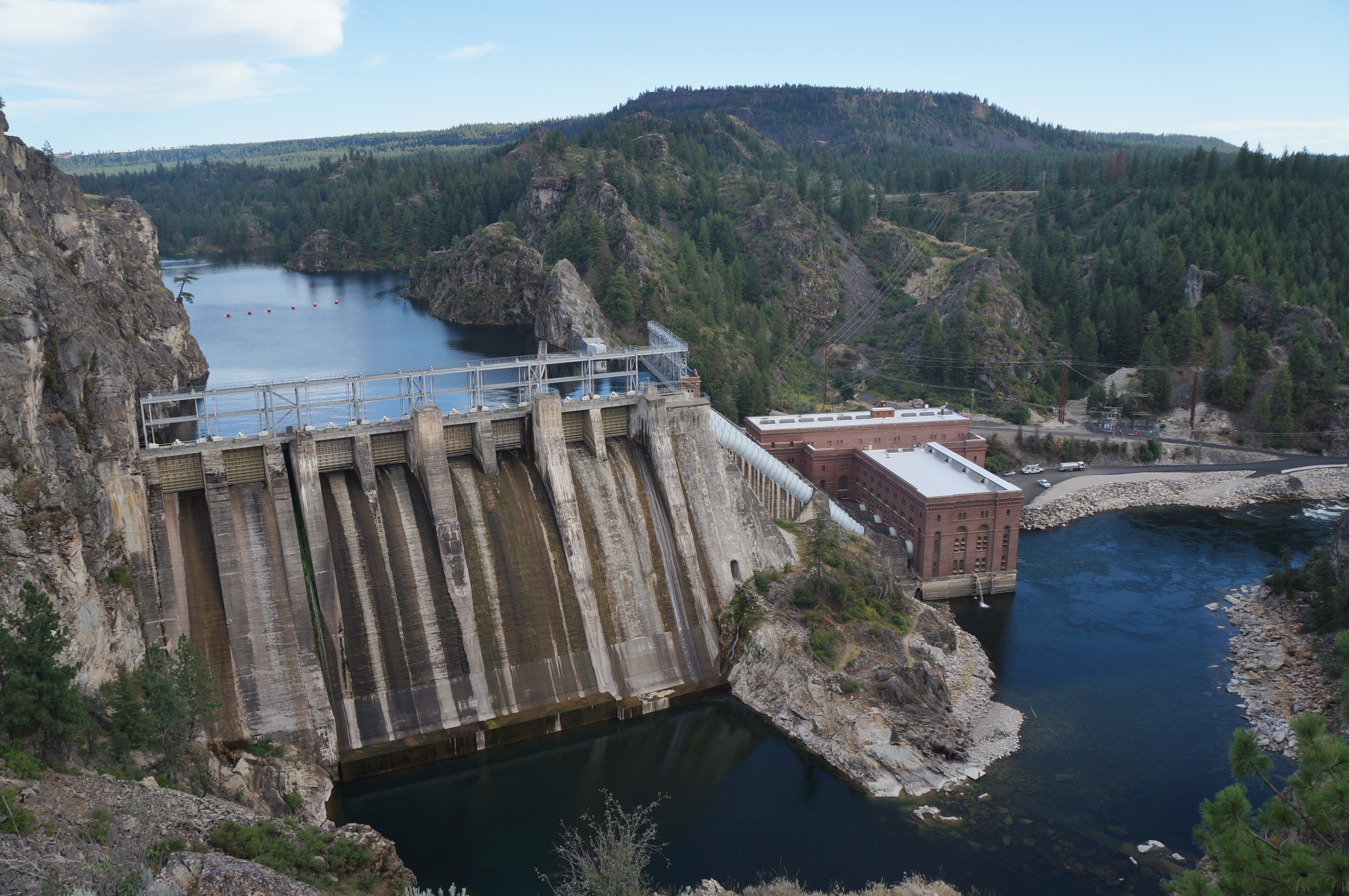
- Interactive map of Long Lake Dam
- Country: United States
- Location: Lincoln / Stevens counties, Washington
- Coordinates: 47°50′14″N 117°50′23″W
- Opening date: 1915

Dam and spillways
- Type of dam: Concrete gravity
- Height: 213 ft (65 m)
- Length: 593 ft (181 m)

Reservoir
- Creates: Long Lake
- Total capacity: 105,000 acre⋅ft (130,000,000 m^{3})

Power Station
- Turbines: 4x Francis
- Installed capacity: 71 MW

Long Lake Dam is a concrete gravity dam on the Spokane River, between Lincoln County and Stevens County about 30 miles (48 km) northwest of Spokane in eastern Washington. It forms Long Lake (Washington), a 23.5 mi (37.8 km) long reservoir, and has a hydroelectric generating capacity of 71 megawatts. The dam was built by Washington Water Power (now Avista Utilities), which operates five other dams along the Spokane.

Upon its completion in 1915, Long Lake Dam completely blocked salmon migrations to the upper portions of the Spokane River watershed, although much larger Grand Coulee Dam on the Columbia River extirpated salmon from the entire Spokane basin by 1942.

== Hydroelectric Power Plant ==
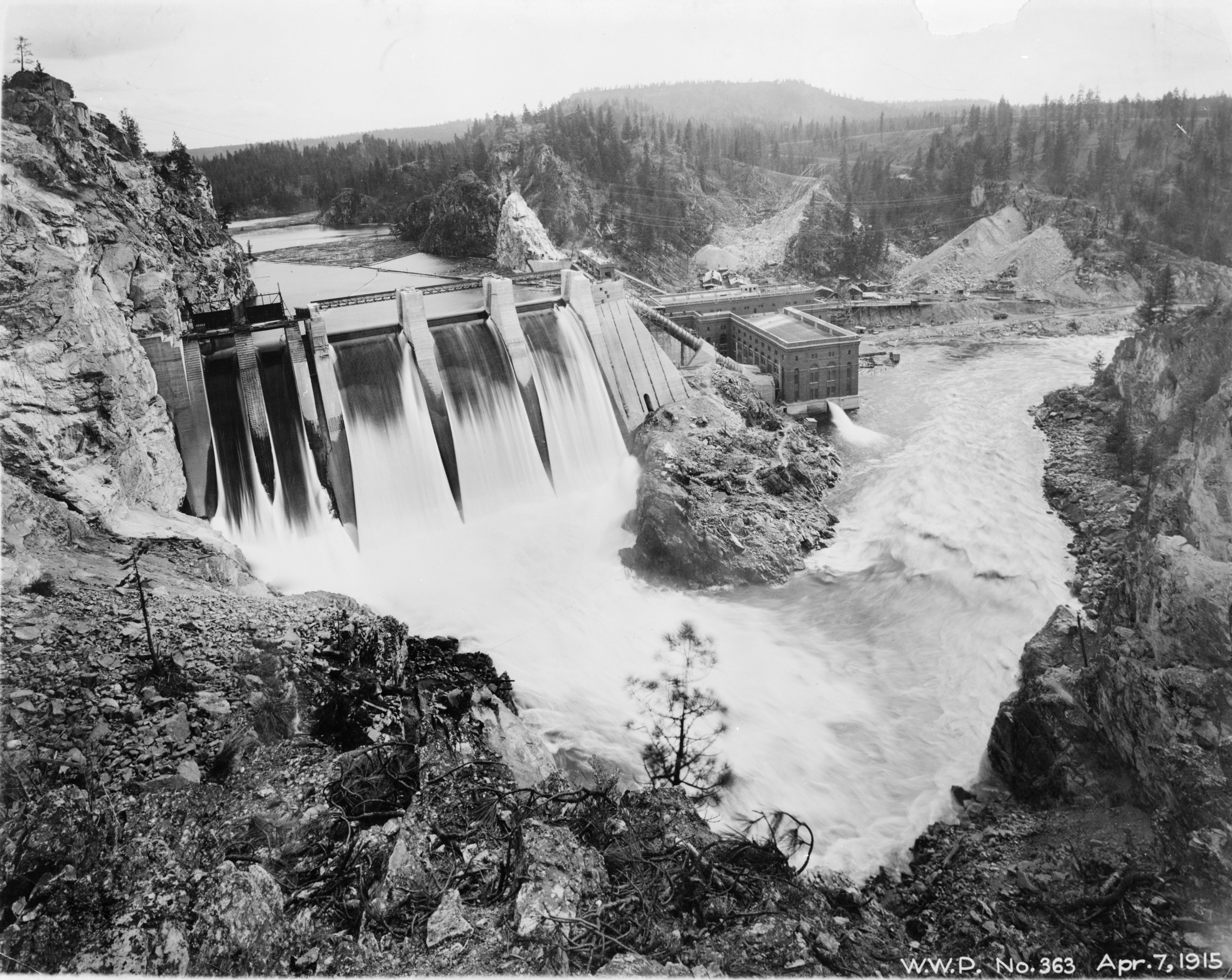
Historical photo of the dam and power plant on April 7, 1915.

The Long Lake Hydroelectric Power Plant was also built in 1915. It was listed on the National Register of Historic Places in 1988. The listing included one contributing building and five contributing structures on 15 acres (6.1 ha) in Lincoln County, Washington and Stevens County, Washington.

It was built by the Washington Water Power Company

== See also ==
- List of dams in the Columbia River watershed
- Little Falls Hydroelectric Power Plant, also built by the Washington Water Power Co. on the Spokane River and NRHP-listed
