= Springdale, Washington =

Springdale
- town
- Springdale, Washington
- Location of Springdale, Washington
- Coordinates: 48°03′24″N 117°44′03″W
- Country: United States
- State: Washington
- County: Stevens

Government
  - Type: Mayor–council
  - Mayor: Stefany Smith

Area
  - Total: 1.13 sq mi (2.93 km^{2})
  - Land: 1.13 sq mi (2.93 km^{2})
  - Water: 0 sq mi (0.00 km^{2})
- Elevation: 2,011 ft (613 m)

Population (2020)
  - Total: 234
  - Density: 207/sq mi (79.9/km^{2})
- Time zone: UTC-8 (Pacific (PST))
  - Summer (DST): UTC-7 (PDT)
- ZIP code: 99173
- Area code: 509
- FIPS code: 53-67210
- GNIS feature ID: 2413320
- Website: town-of-springdale.com

Springdale is a town in Stevens County, Washington, United States. The population was 234 at the 2020 census.

== History ==
The present site of Springdale was a wilderness until about 1886, when Mr. John Shriner and Mr. Charles O. Squire arrived at about the same time. Squire erected the first sawmill in 1887. Once Mr. Squire finalized his homestead, he platted the area on November 29, 1889, which he called Squire City. He became the first postmaster in December 1889 and named the town "Squires City."

Mark P. Sheffer was the first merchant. He brought in material by horse-drawn freight wagons prior to the arrival on the railroad.

In 1889, the Spokane Falls & Northern Railway (SF&N) was completed to the area and the depot was called Springdale. Springdale was the lunch stop between Spokane and Northport on the SF&NRR. Sometime before 1892, residents petitioned to have the town's name changed to "Springdale." While the exact reason for this is unknown, the town is built over a series of subterranean streams, many of which emerge from the ground as springs. Springdale was officially incorporated on February 9, 1903.

The Springdale Reformer, started by Elmer Burrows, was published from 1907 to 1923.

The entire business section of Springdale was destroyed by fire, July 9, 1908.

== Geography ==
According to the United States Census Bureau, the town has a total area of 1.14 square miles (2.95 km^{2}), all of it land.

== Demographics ==
Historical population
Census	Pop.	Note	%±
1910	251		—
1920	184		−26.7%
1930	215		16.8%
1940	227		5.6%
1950	268		18.1%
1960	254		−5.2%
1970	215		−15.4%
1980	281		30.7%
1990	260		−7.5%
2000	283		8.8%
2010	285		0.7%
2020	234		−17.9%
U.S. Decennial Census; 2015 Estimate

=== 2010 census ===
As of the 2010 census, there were 285 people, 105 households, and 75 families living in the town. The population density was 250.0 inhabitants per square mile (96.5/km^{2}). There were 118 housing units at an average density of 103.5 per square mile (40.0/km^{2}). The racial makeup of the town was 88.4% White, 1.4% African American, 4.6% Native American, 1.1% from other races, and 4.6% from two or more races. Hispanic or Latino of any race were 6.0% of the population.

There were 105 households, of which 37.1% had children under the age of 18 living with them, 47.6% were married couples living together, 16.2% had a female householder with no husband present, 7.6% had a male householder with no wife present, and 28.6% were non-families. 17.1% of all households were made up of individuals, and 8.6% had someone living alone who was 65 years of age or older. The average household size was 2.71 and the average family size was 3.12.

The median age in the town was 37.9 years. 27% of residents were under the age of 18; 8.2% were between the ages of 18 and 24; 24.3% were from 25 to 44; 23.5% were from 45 to 64; and 17.2% were 65 years of age or older. The gender makeup of the town was 56.1% male and 43.9% female.

=== 2000 census ===
As of the 2000 census, there were 283 people, 100 households, and 74 families living in the town. The population density was 279.7 people per square mile (108.2/km^{2}). There were 109 housing units at an average density of 107.7 per square mile (41.7/km^{2}). The racial makeup of the town was 93.99% White, 0.71% African American, 0.71% Native American, 0.71% Pacific Islander, 0.35% from other races, and 3.53% from two or more races. Hispanic or Latino of any race were 3.18% of the population.

There were 100 households, out of which 39.0% had children under the age of 18 living with them, 46.0% were married couples living together, 23.0% had a female householder with no husband present, and 26.0% were non-families. 23.0% of all households were made up of individuals, and 12.0% had someone living alone who was 65 years of age or older. The average household size was 2.77 and the average family size was 3.23.

In the town, the age distribution of the population shows 35.0% under the age of 18, 6.0% from 18 to 24, 24.0% from 25 to 44, 23.0% from 45 to 64, and 12.0% who were 65 years of age or older. The median age was 34 years. For every 100 females, there were 116.0 males. For every 100 females age 18 and over, there were 102.2 males.

The median income for a household in the town was $28,333, and the median income for a family was $27,188. Males had a median income of $31,875 versus $16,563 for females. The per capita income for the town was $10,412. About 24.7% of families and 34.1% of the population were below the poverty line, including 45.1% of those under the age of eighteen and 5.9% of those sixty-five or over.

== Education ==
The Mary Walker School District, No. 207. In addition to Springdale Preschool (traditional and ECEAP), our district consists of six (6) traditional and Alternative Learning Experience (ALE) schools: Springdale Elementary (K-5), Springdale Middle School (6-8), Mary Walker High School (9-12), Mary Walker Alternative High School (9-12), Mary Walker Promise (K-12) and Springdale Academy (K-12).

The Middle School and High School have a wide range of sports and activities, with programs competing up to the state level. Their team has gone to state in cross country three years straight (2015, 2016, 2017).

== Notable people ==
- Lucian Pulvermacher – Anti-Pope Pius XIII
- Lois Stratton, Washington state representative
