= Spokane River =

River in Idaho and Washington state, United States

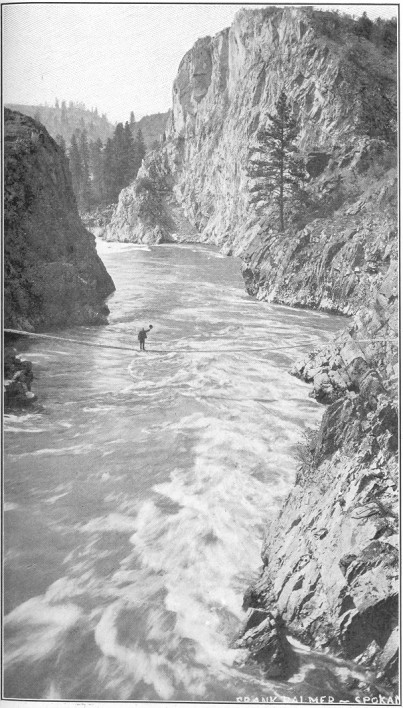
- Spokane River in Lincoln County, 1909

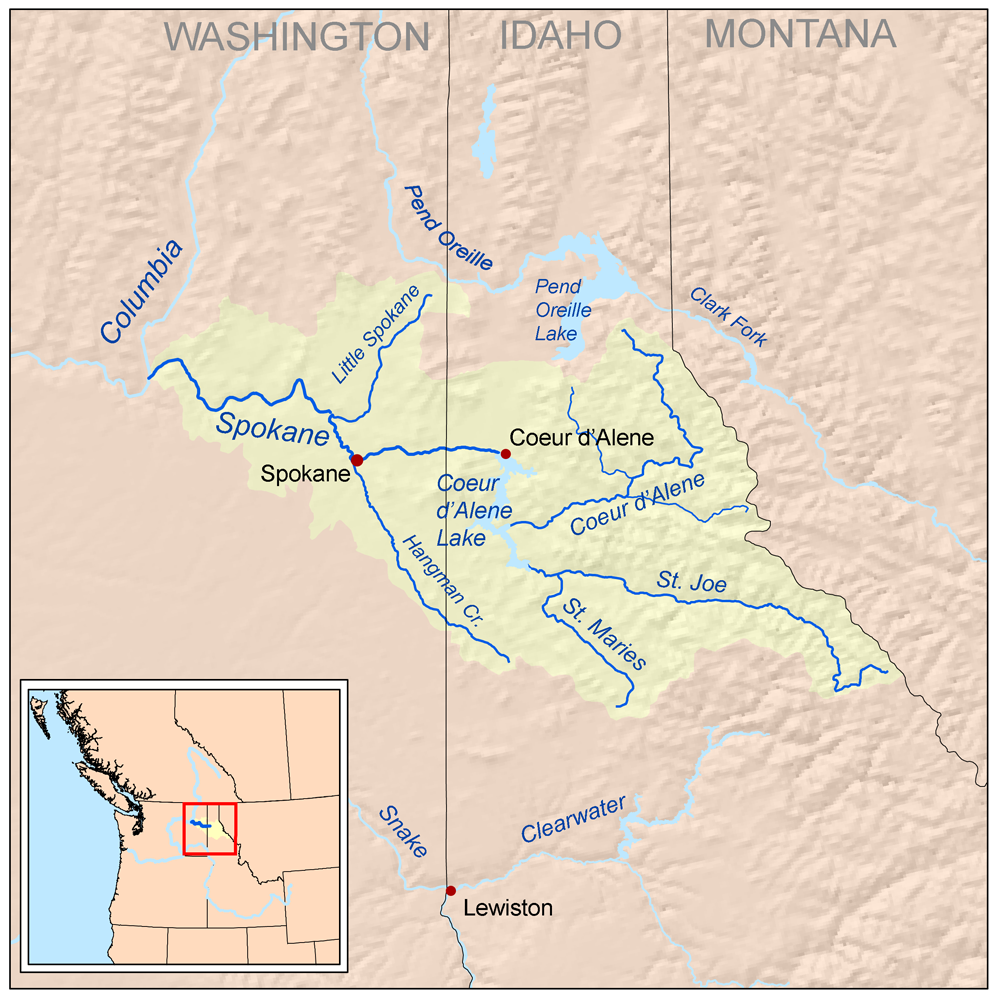
- Spokane River watershed
- Etymology: Spokane tribe, the "sun people"

Location
- Country: United States
- State: Washington, Idaho
- County: Kootenai, Spokane, Stevens, Lincoln

Physical characteristics
- Source: Lake Coeur d'Alene
  - location: Kootenai County, Idaho
  - coordinates: 47°40′41″N 117°07′34″W
  - elevation: 1,994 ft (608 m)
- Mouth: Columbia River at
  - location: Lake Roosevelt, Washington
  - coordinates: 47°53′38″N 118°20′03″W
  - elevation: 1,293 ft (394 m)
- Length: 111 mi (179 km)
- Basin size: 6,020 sq mi (15,600 km^{2})
- Discharge
  - location: mouth, max and min at Long Lake Dam
  - average: 7,946 cu ft/s (225.0 m^{3}/s)
  - minimum: 90 cu ft/s (2.5 m^{3}/s)
  - maximum: 49,700 cu ft/s (1,410 m^{3}/s)

Basin features
- Progression: Columbia River → Pacific Ocean
- River system: Columbia River
- Tributaries
  - left: Cable Creek, Latah Creek, Deep Creek
  - right: Little Spokane River

The Spokane River is a left tributary of the Columbia River, approximately 111 miles (179 km) long, in northern Idaho and eastern Washington in the United States. It drains a low mountainous area east of the Columbia, passing through the Spokane Valley and the city of Spokane, Washington.

== Description ==
The Spokane River drains the northern part of Lake Coeur d'Alene in the Idaho Panhandle, emptying into the Columbia River at Franklin D. Roosevelt Lake, approximately 110 miles (180 km) downstream.

From Lake Coeur d'Alene, the Spokane River traverses the Rathdrum Prairie until reaching Post Falls, Idaho where it passes over a Post Falls Dam, and a natural 40-foot waterfall. Continuing westward it passes over 6 more dams, three of which (Upriver Dam, Upper Falls Dam, Monroe Street Dam) are located in the city of Spokane. In Spokane, it flows over the Spokane Falls, which are located in the heart of Downtown Spokane, approximately one third of the way down the river's length. About a mile later, the river receives Latah Creek from the southeast. Soon afterwards, it is met from the northeast by the Little Spokane River, on the western edge of the city of Spokane. It flows in a zigzag course along the southern edge of the Selkirk Mountains, forming the southern boundary of the Spokane Indian Reservation, where it is impounded by the Long Lake Dam to form Long Lake, a 15-mile (24 km) reservoir. It joins Franklin D. Roosevelt Lake on the Columbia from the east at Miles. The site of historic Fort Spokane is located at the confluence of the Spokane and Columbia rivers.

The Spokane River's entire drainage basin is about 6,240 square miles (16,200 km^{2}) large, of which 3,840 square miles (9,900 km^{2}) are above Post Falls Dam at the outlet of Coeur d'Alene Lake. Its mean annual discharge is 7,946 cubic feet per second (225 m^{3}/s).

== Human use ==
Until the 18th century, the Coeur d'Alene (Schḭtsu'umsh) and Spokane Native Americans (along with other Interior Salish peoples) used to live and travel along the banks of the Spokane River. In 1807, David Thompson was the first European to cross the Rocky Mountains and explore the area.

Today, the Spokane metropolitan area (population 573,493) is the largest human settlement on the banks of the Spokane River. The metropolitan area of Coeur d'Alene (pop. 170,628) is immediately to the east and upstream of the Spokane metropolitan area. The Spokane River and Lake Coeur d'Alene are the primary sources of recharge for the Spokane Valley–Rathdrum Prairie Aquifer, which is the primary source of drinking water for each of these settlements.

== Pollution ==
The Spokane River contains some of the highest concentrations of heavy metals of any river in the state, resulting from pollution coming from Lake Coeur D'Alene and traveling from the Bunker Hill Mine and Smelting Complex Superfund site.

Spokane's sewage treatment facilities empty their outflow into the Spokane River. In 1889, Spokane built a sewage system that dumped raw sewage directly into the river, which was visibly noticeable by 1920. In 1957 a primary treatment facility was installed; however, this was soon deemed inadequate by the Washington State Department of Ecology. This led to the construction of a more advanced treatment plant that utilized chemical precipitation technology, which was connected in 1975, and operational by 1977.

== Fish habitat ==
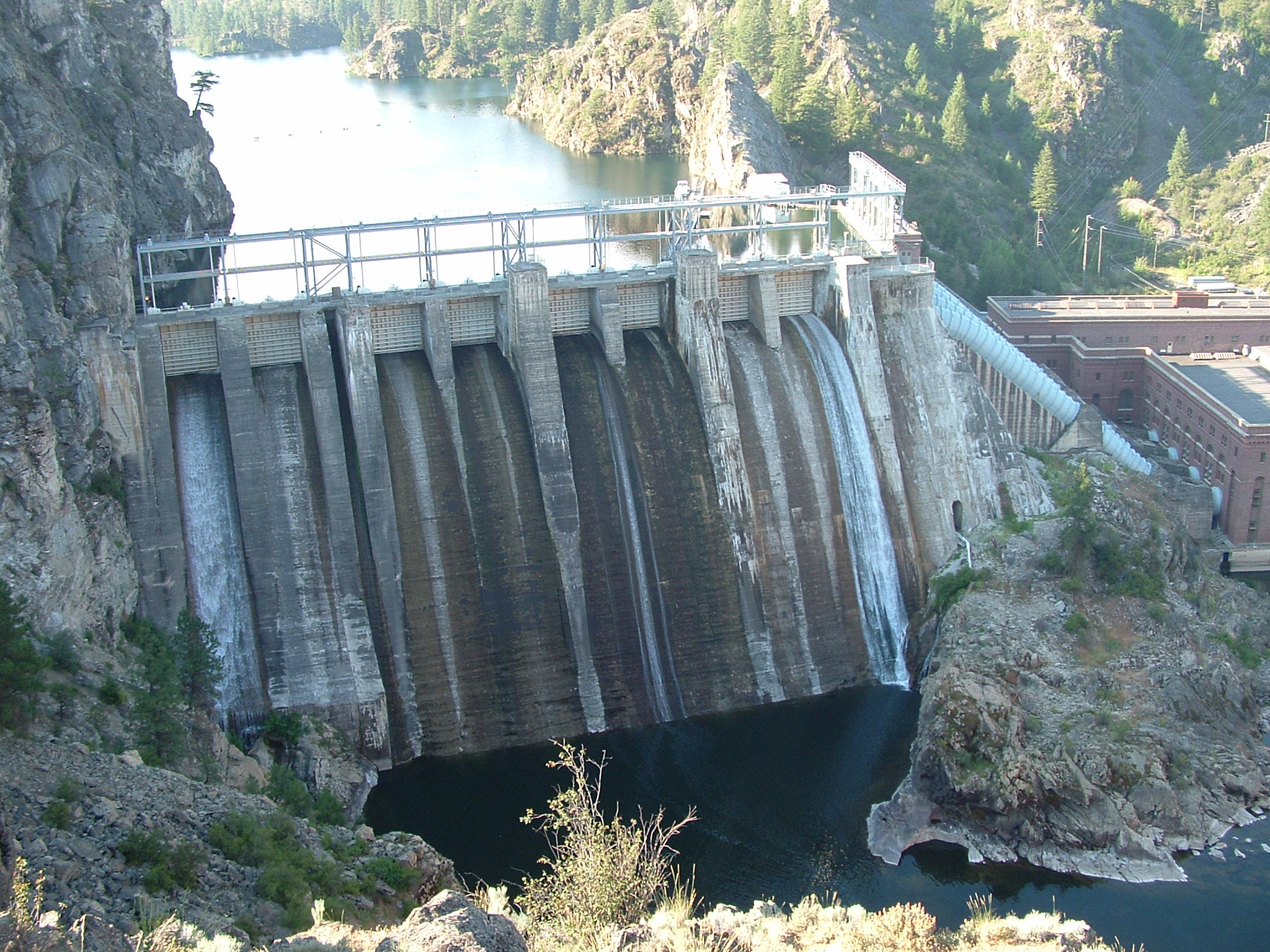
Long Lake Dam on the Spokane River, the construction of which wiped out the salmon populations that used to travel upstream.

After the Northern Pacific Railway lines arrived in Spokane in 1882, there was rapid growth in milling operations along the river. Many of these mills required dams to provide power for their machinery. As a result of the dams blocking the river, salmon populations in the Spokane plummeted, leading to complaints from many of the people living upstream. After the construction of Little Falls Dam in 1910 by Washington Water Power blocked upstream passage, the river's salmon populations disappeared completely.

Steelhead were also abundant on the Spokane River, prior to pollution and the construction of the dams. Today, the Spokane River system is one of the two largest unoccupied stretches of steelhead habitat within their former range.

Today, the Spokane River supports populations of rainbow trout, northern pikeminnow, and Bridgelip Suckers (Catostomus columbianus), as well as several non-native species. Many of the remaining fish, however, are not suitable for human consumption due to the chemical pollution in the river, with signs alongside the river warning that the fish are contaminated with PCBs.

== Salmon restoration in the Spokane River ==
In recent years the Spokane River has been home to anadromous fish restoration efforts. These efforts benefit fish such as Chinook salmon, Sockeye salmon, and steelhead trout. These efforts have been led by the Upper Columbia United Tribes (UCUT). Their plan is to reintroduce salmon to their historical habitat in the Spokane River and other areas in the Upper Columbia Basin. Currently UCUT is in phase two of their plan, which involves having researchers and teams of tribal members test the waters, improve habitat, and monitor water quality in the areas that salmon once lived. UCUT has received a long-term grant from the U.S. Department of the Interior. In the future the tribes hope to be able to expand their monitoring and reintroduction programs to determine where to add fish passage and improve spawning grounds.

Specifically in the Spokane area, several local groups are joining the reintroduction efforts. The Spokane Salmon Restoration Collaborative focuses on the rebuilding and repairing of traditional salmon spawning grounds. They also aim to protect the local redband trout that also live in the river. The SSRC works with community members, scientists, and local tribes to restore side channels, plant native plants along the bank, and raise awareness of what a healthy habitat with salmon could look like. The Lands Council is also playing a key role in the efforts by improving river health and fish passage in the salmon’s habitat. Usually their projects involve removing barriers that block fish passage or advocating for cleaner water to make the river a place where salmon can call home once more. The Spokane Riverkeeper also fights to protect the flow and cleanliness of the water where salmon could be reintroduced.The Riverkeeper also cleans the banks and holds polluters accountable in order to make the Spokane River a future home for salmon.

== Crossings ==
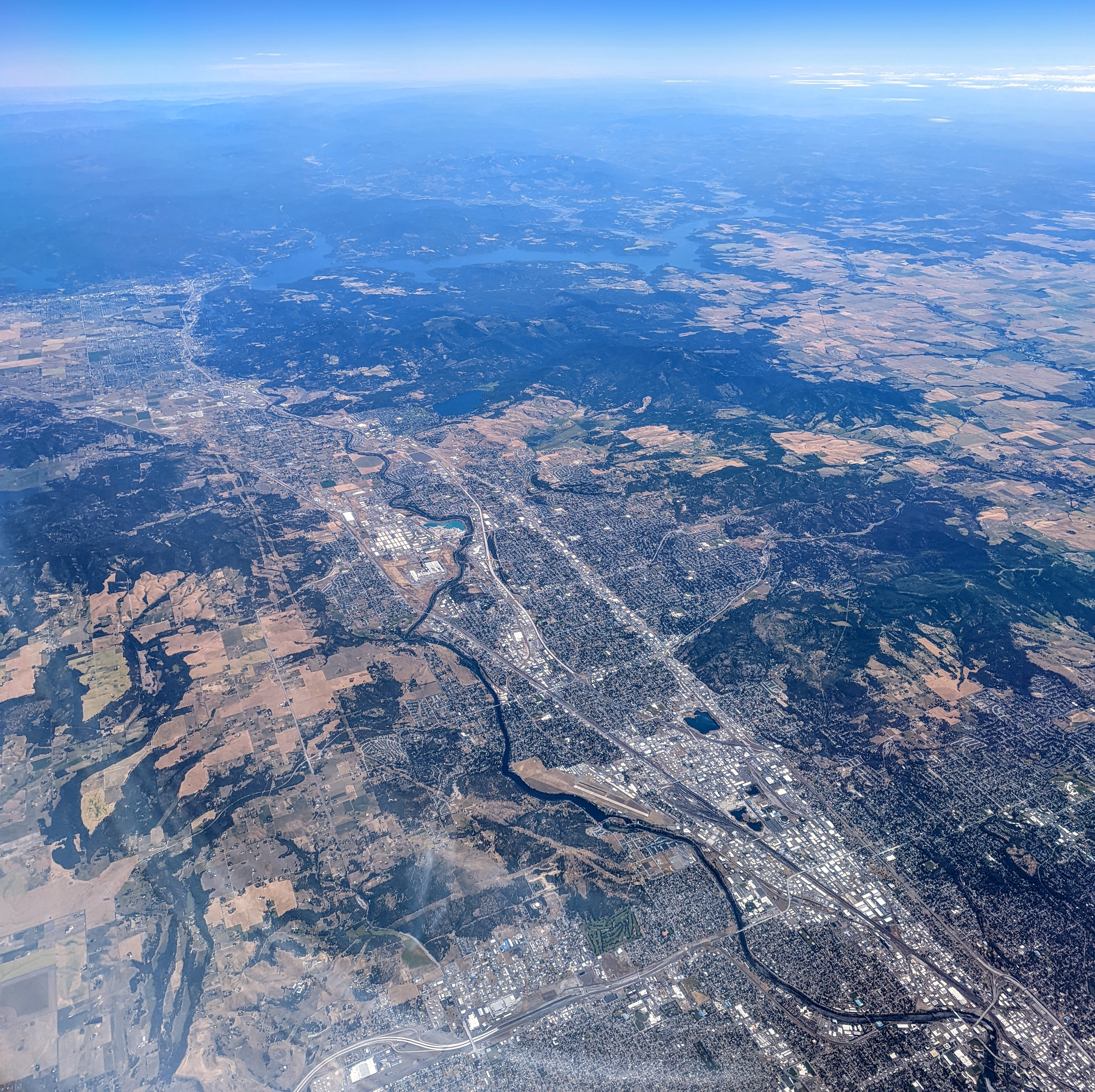
Aerial view the Spokane River at Spokane, with Lake Coeur d'Alene in the background

== See also ==
- Bunker Hill Mine and Smelting Complex
- List of Idaho rivers
- List of longest streams of Idaho
- List of Washington rivers
- Spokane River Centennial Trail
- North Idaho Centennial Trail
- Harker Canyon
