= Deep Creek (Washington) =

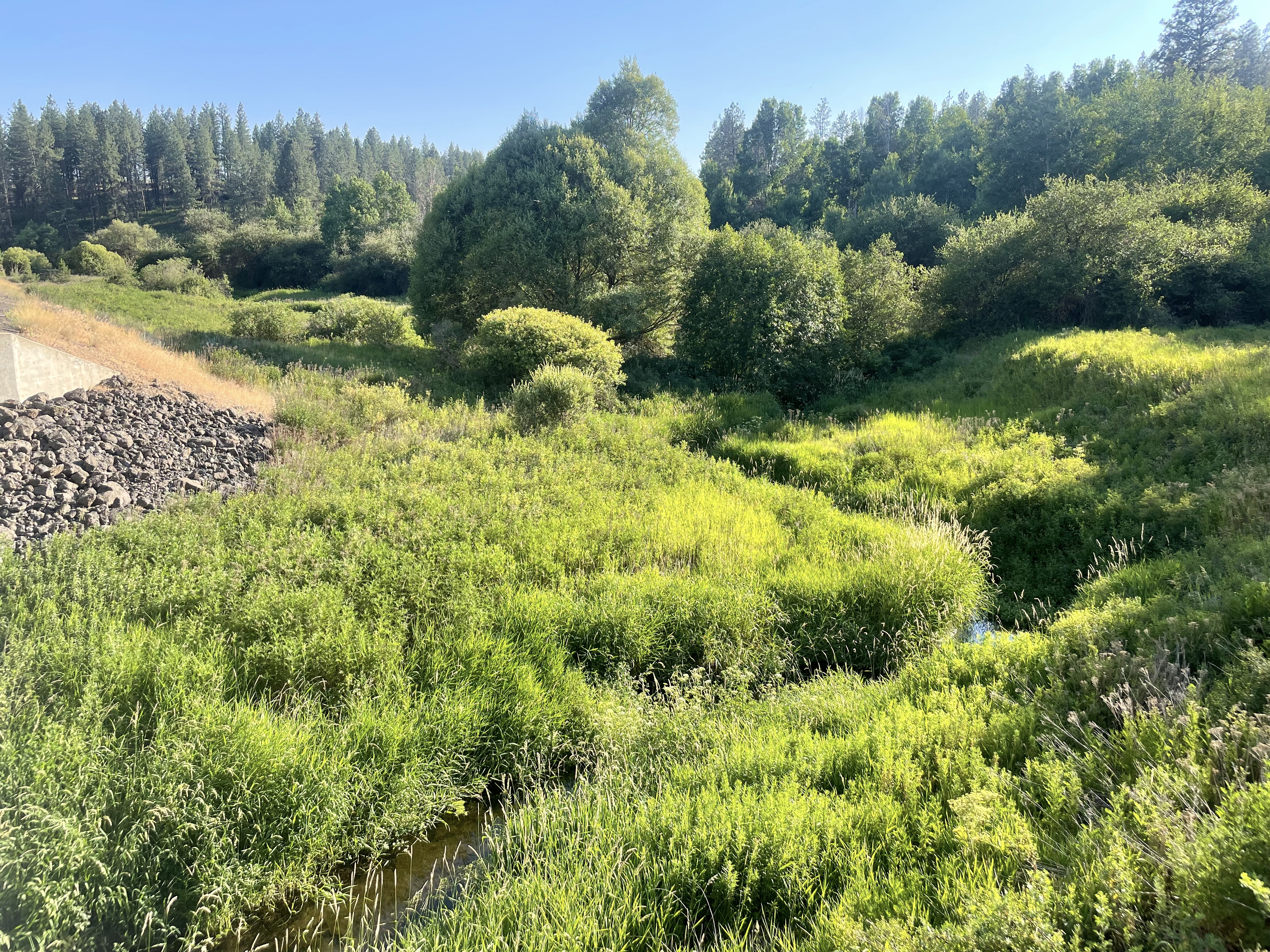
- Deep Creek at Deep Creek Road

- Location of the mouth of Deep Creek in Washington Deep Creek (Washington) (the United States)

Location
- Country: United States
- State: Washington
- County: Spokane

Physical characteristics
- Source: Confluence of North and South Forks
  - location: Near Espanola, Washington
  - coordinates: 47°37′14″N 117°45′33″W
  - elevation: 2,335 ft (712 m)
- Mouth: Spokane River at
  - location: Nine Mile Falls, Washington
  - coordinates: 47°45′49″N 117°32′51″W
  - elevation: 1,611 ft (491 m)
- Length: 23 mi (37 km)

Basin features
- Tributaries
  - left: North Fork Deep Creek, Spring Creek, Coulee Creek
  - right: South Fork Deep Creek

Deep Creek is a stream of approximately 23 miles which is formed at the confluence of the North Fork Deep Creek and South Fork Deep Creek two miles southwest of the community of Deep Creek, Washington, United States, on the far western edge of Spokane County. The creek has its mouth at the Spokane River in Riverside State Park where it cuts a thin canyon through basalt with depths reaching over 600 feet from the land above. The creek and its tributaries flow through mostly rural agricultural areas west of the Spokane urban area, though the headwaters and mouth are both located on state-owned conservation land.

== Course ==
Deep Creek is formed at the confluence of the North Fork Deep Creek and South Fork Deep Creek on the far western edge of Spokane County, one mile north of the community of Espanola and two miles southwest of the community of Deep Creek. North Fork Deep Creek has its source at Audubon Lake in the town of Reardan in neighboring Lincoln County Audubon Lake also serves as the source of Crab Creek which flows west into the Columbia River. The North Fork flows in a southeasterly direction next to U.S. Route 2. South Fork Deep Creek rises two miles south of Reardan and flows in a "U" shape first south-southeast before turning to the northeast at Willon Springs.

About one mile downstream of the confluence the stream turns to the northwest and begins paralleling a nearly 200-foot-tall hillside where the deep nature of the name begins to become apparent. Two miles from the confluence the creek flows through the community to which it gave its name where it passes under U.S. Route 2. A few miles beyond that the creek enters a thin valley roughly 1,000 feet wide carved into the Columbia Plateau with walls rising 200 feet or more.

Unlike most streams, which gain water as they descend downstream, Deep Creek's flow decreases as it approaches its mouth. This is not due to the stream drying up, but rather the stream gradually infiltrates the subsurface over its course, with surface flow in the lower reaches often absent altogether. While this gives the appearance of an ephemeral stream, with visible surface flows in the lower reaches only occurring during spring snow melt, after heavy rains, or during uncommon events of rainfall onto frozen ground, the stream is considered perennial due to consistent input of groundwater from aquifers contained in the Wanapum Basalt which underlies the upper portions of the stream. The very lowest reaches of Deep Creek, in Deep Creek Canyon, feature springs as the creek nears the water table at the elevation of the Spokane River and the water of Deep Creek returns to the surface.

Four miles from its mouth at the Spokane River, the Deep Creek valley opens up into the valley of Coulee Creek, which flows in from the west. It is here that Deep Creek enters Riverside State Park. Both creeks begin a descent into a thin, deep canyon just before Coulee Creek empties into Deep Creek. The canyon is flanked by near vertical basalt walls that are in places vertical cliffs less than 100 feet apart. The area is popular with hikers and rock climbers. A bridge carrying the Spokane River Centennial Trail crosses over the creek at its mouth. The community of Nine Mile Falls is located across the Spokane River from the mouth of Deep Creek.

== Human use ==
For centuries, the watershed of Coulee Creek was part of the homeland of the Spokane people.

European settlement of the area began in the second-half of the 19th century. An 1885 guide book for emigrants lauded the agricultural potential of the Deep Creek watershed. It spoke of the small community then known as Deep Creek Falls as being situated on "a small creek, running from southwest to northeast, passes through the town furnishing an abundance of pure water, and the falls, from which the town takes its name, furnishes sufficient power to run one of the best flouring mills in the West."

Human use of the Coulee Creek watershed has dramatically altered it from the original natural state. Sampling done in 2010 found phosphorus loads ranging from 0.25 to 1.85 pounds per day, with a median of 0.5 pounds per day, entered the Spokane River via Deep Creek. Agriculture now dominates the watershed, and farming has removed natural trees and shrubs from the creek's banks, especially in the upper portions of the watershed. In 2012, efforts led by the Lands Council were undertaken to return the creek to a more natural state, with a $22,000 grant issued to remove invasive reed canary grass from the banks of Deep and neighboring Coulee Creeks and plant 2,500 native plant species in its place.

== Gallery ==
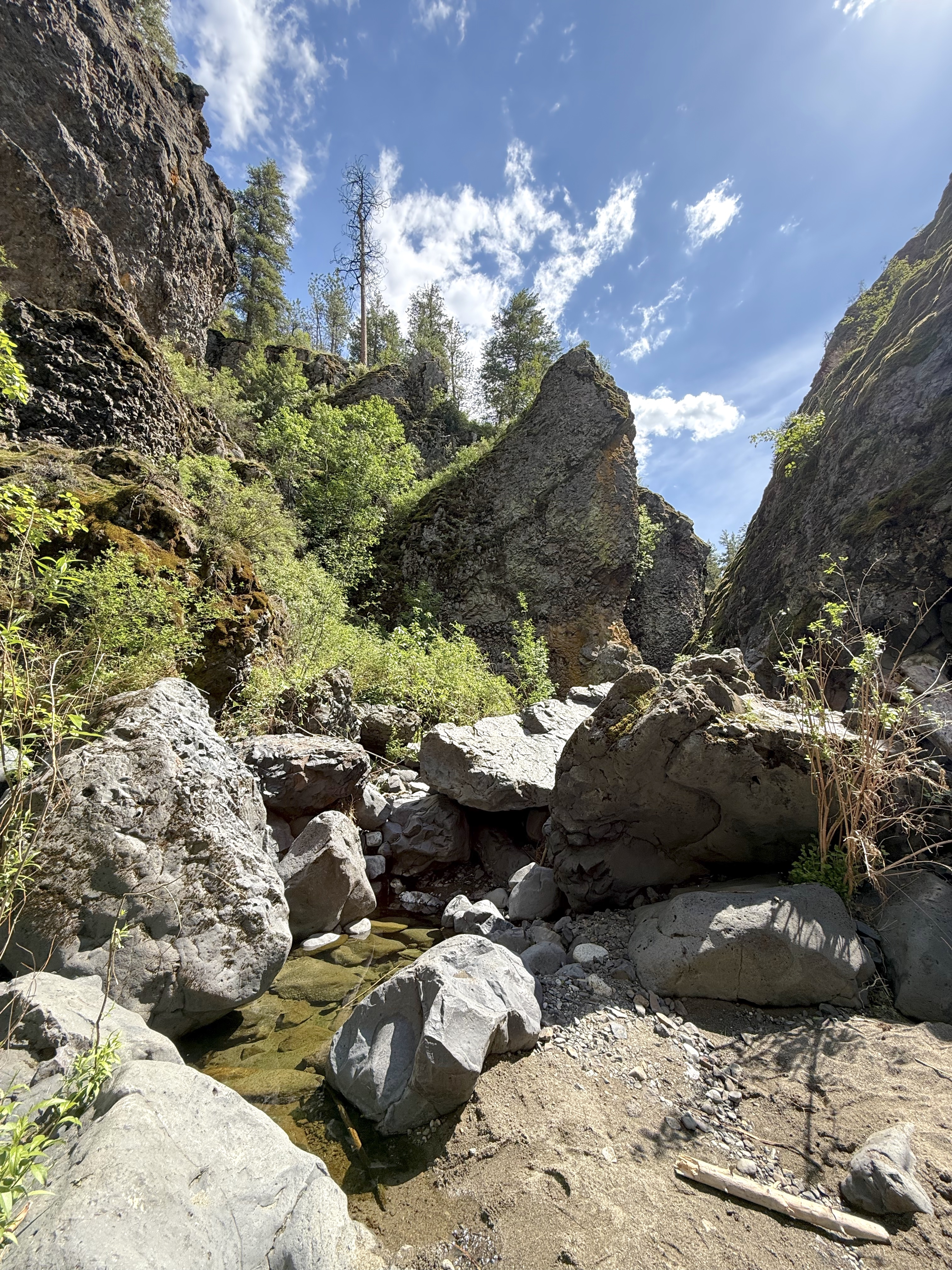
Deep Creek Canyon

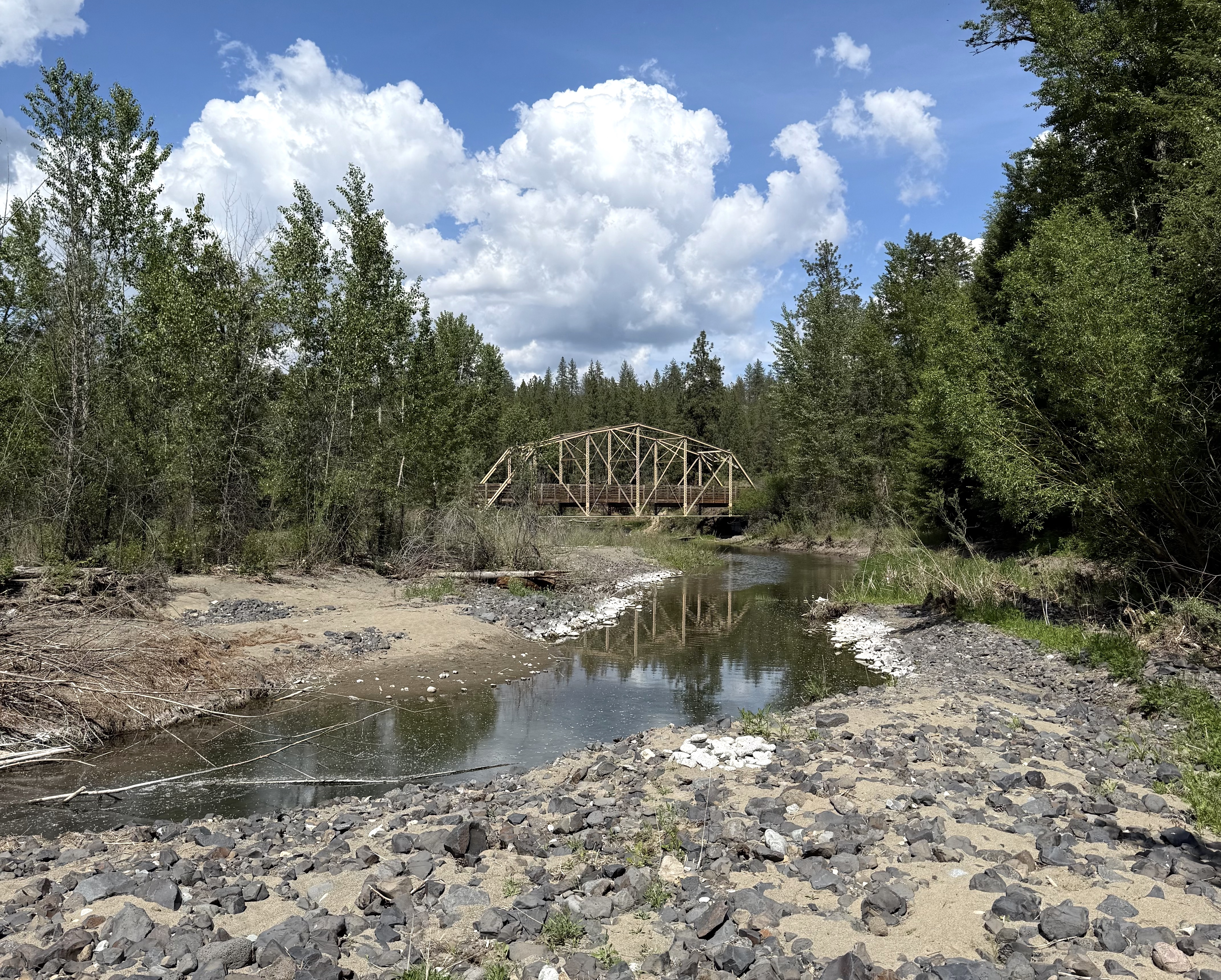
Bridge over the mouth of Deep Creek

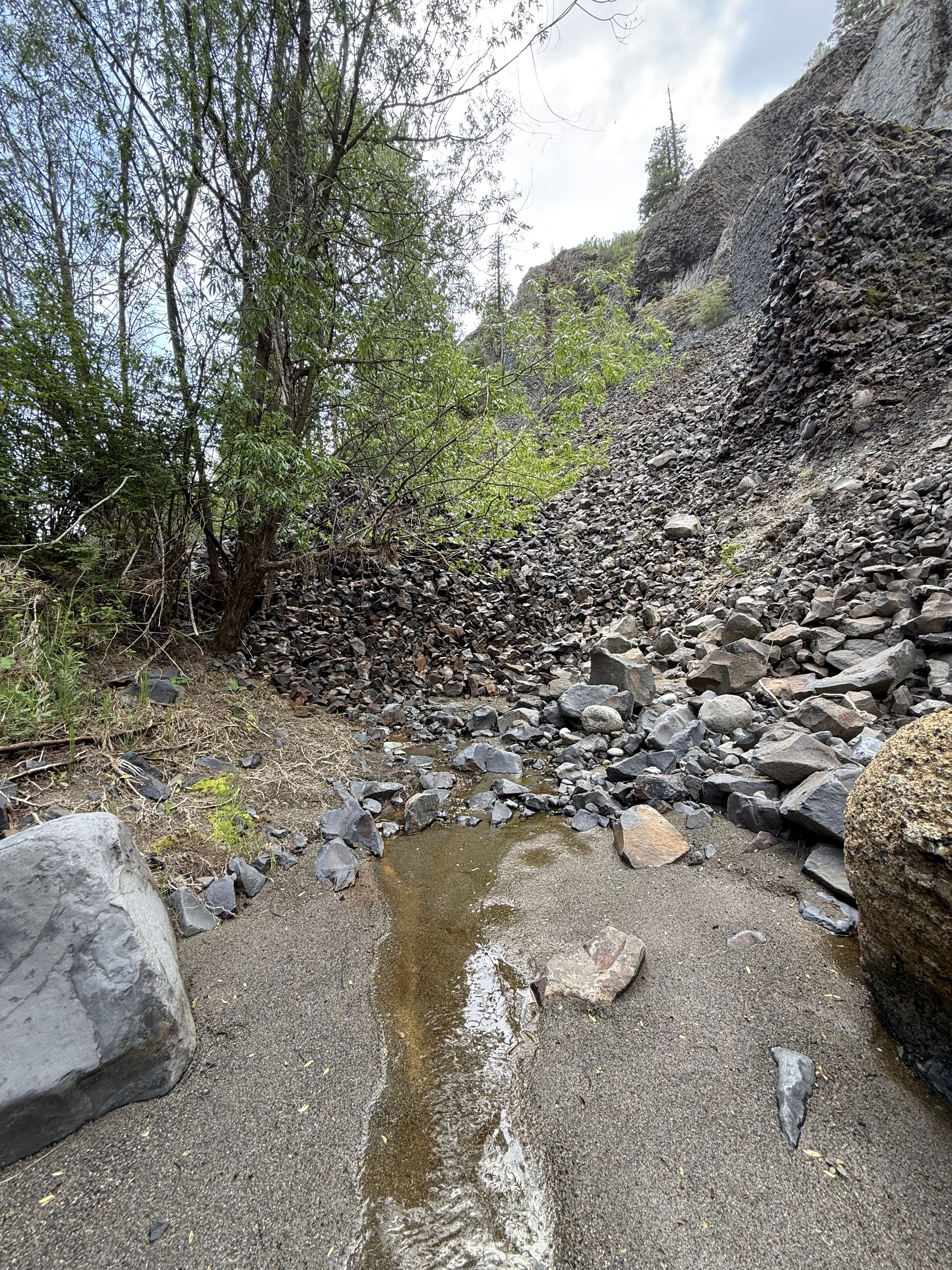
Deep Creek reemerging in Deep Creek Canyon
