= Deep Creek, Washington =

Unincorporated community in Washington, United States

- Unincorporated community
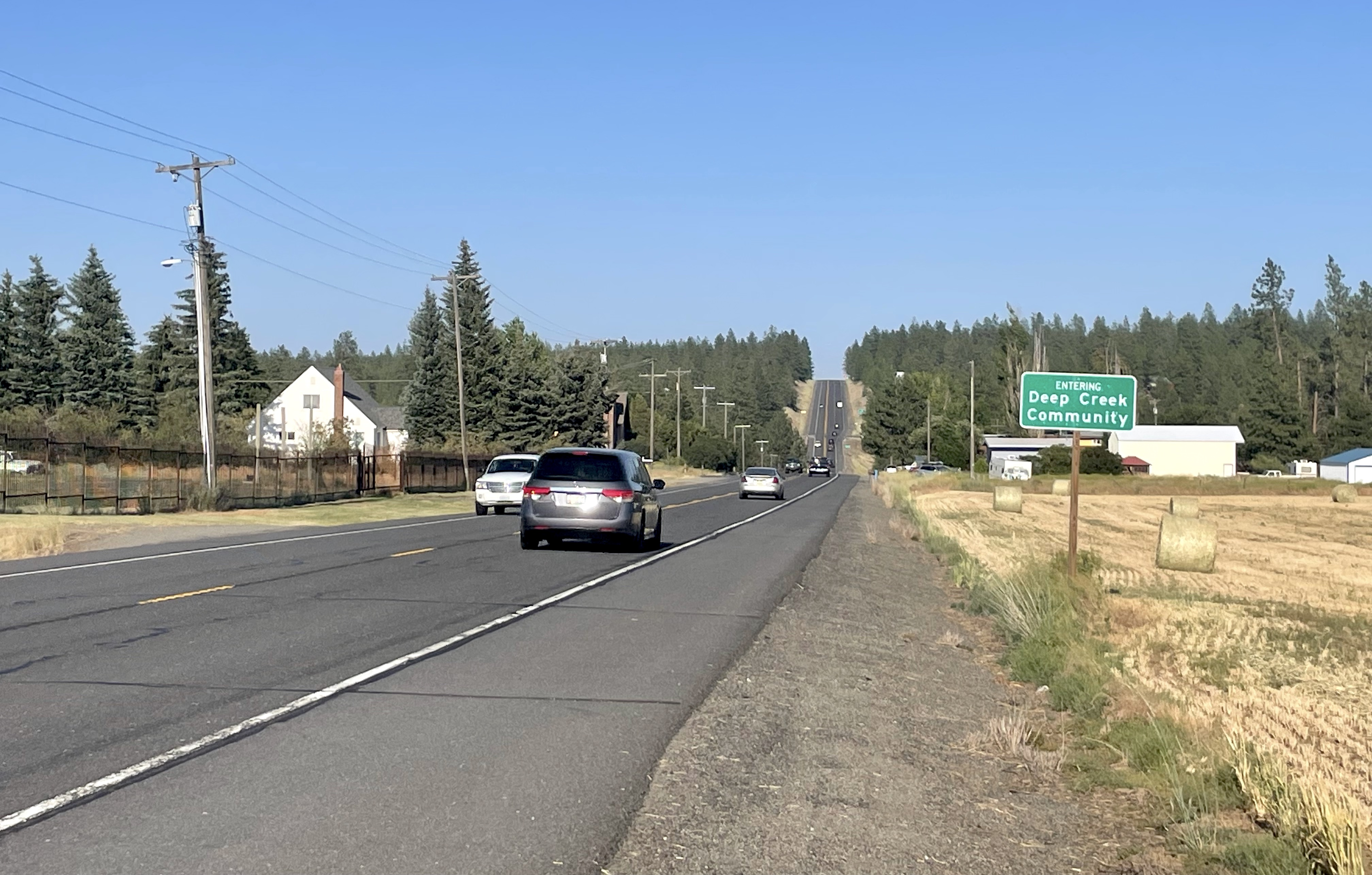
- Highway 2 in Deep Creek

- Location within Washington (state)
- Coordinates: 47°38′35″N 117°42′44″W
- Country: United States
- State: Washington
- County: Spokane
- Elevation: 2,313 ft (705 m)
- Time zone: UTC-8 (Pacific (PST))
  - Summer (DST): UTC-7 (PDT)
- ZIP code: 99022, 99029
- Area code: 509
- GNIS feature ID: 1510908

Deep Creek is an unincorporated community in Spokane County, Washington. A creek of the same name flows through the community. Deep Creek is located along U.S. Route 2 in a rural area near the Lincoln County line.

== Geography ==
Deep Creek is located 14 miles west of Downtown Spokane along U.S. Route 2 and two miles northwest of Fairchild Air Force Base. The city of Airway Heights, which forms the westernmost suburb of the Spokane urban area, is located five miles to the east along U.S. 2. The rural community of Espanola is located four miles to the south.

Immediately to the east of the community is a hill that rises 180 feet above Deep Creek. The creek of the same name follows the hillside through the community in a northeasterly direction towards Riverside State Park where it empties into the Spokane River near the community of Nine Mile Falls.

== History ==
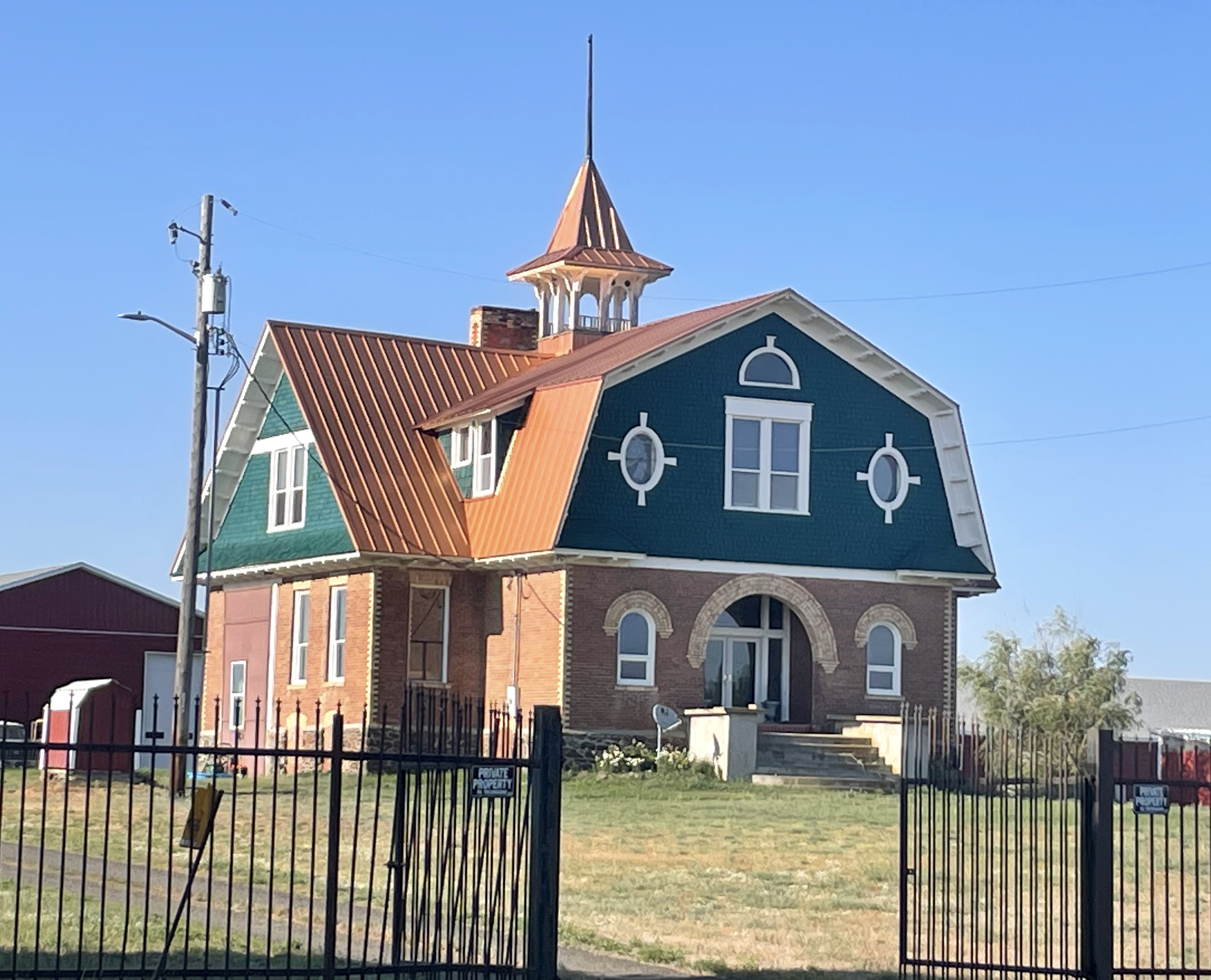
Former school building

The community of Deep Creek was founded in 1883 and originally known as Deep Creek Falls. In 1894 the name was shortened to Deep Creek. The agricultural potential of the area was promoted to attract settlers. The community, which was incorporated as a town, saw its heyday during the first decades of its existence. At its peak, Deep Creek was home to multiple churches, businesses, a mill and a school which served more than 100 students. The historic Deep Creek school was constructed in 1905. The community faded through the 1910s and 1920s before ultimately facing disincorporation in 1939. The school continued operations for five more years before being shuttered in 1944.

In 1960, a Hutterite community was established in the Deep Creek area. Led by Paul S. Gross, who brought his family from Alberta, the Hutterites purchased and leased more than 3,000 acres of farmland immediately north of the community. It was the first Hutterite community west of the Rocky Mountains. The community remains active into the 21st century.

In 2006, Deep Creek area wells were found to be tainted with three toxic chemicals which investigators suspected entered the groundwater supply from a nearby Nike missile site. The Environmental Protection Agency found trichloroethylene, perchlorate and N-nitrosodimethylamine in area wells. Concentrations of trichloroethylene were found to be 210 parts per billion, well above the maximum concentration level for human consumption of 5 parts per billion. Levels of N-nitrosodimethylamine were twice the maximum concentration level.
