= Cheney, Washington =

- City
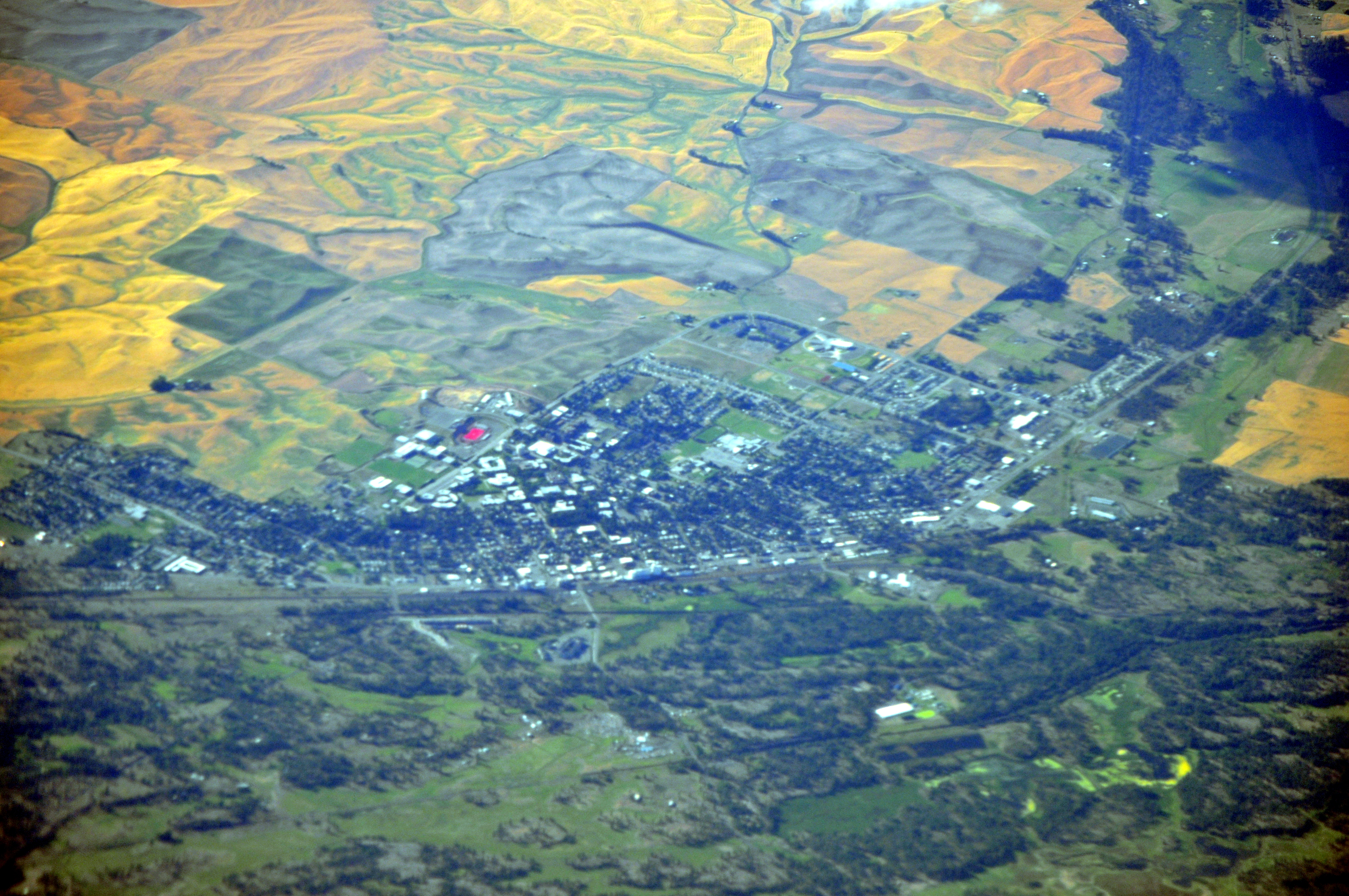
- Aerial view of Cheney, Washington, 2013

- Location of Cheney, Washington
- Coordinates: 47°29′19″N 117°34′43″W
- Country: United States
- State: Washington
- County: Spokane
- Established: November 28, 1883
- Named for: Benjamin Pierce Cheney

Government
  - Type: Mayor-Council/Strong Mayor
  - Mayor: Elsa Martin

Area
  - Total: 4.37 sq mi (11.32 km^{2})
  - Land: 4.34 sq mi (11.25 km^{2})
  - Water: 0.031 sq mi (0.08 km^{2})
- Elevation: 2,352 ft (717 m)

Population (2020)
  - Total: 13,255
  - Density: 3,052.7/sq mi (1,178.7/km^{2})
- Time zone: UTC-8 (Pacific (PST))
  - Summer (DST): UTC-7 (PDT)
- ZIP code: 99004
- Area code: 509
- FIPS code: 53-11825
- GNIS feature ID: 1531416
- Website: cityofcheney.org

Cheney (/ˈtʃiːni/ CHEE-nee) is a city in Spokane County, Washington, United States. The full-time resident population was 13,255 as of the 2020 census. Eastern Washington University is located in Cheney. When classes are in session at EWU, the city's population reaches approximately 17,600 people temporarily.

== History ==
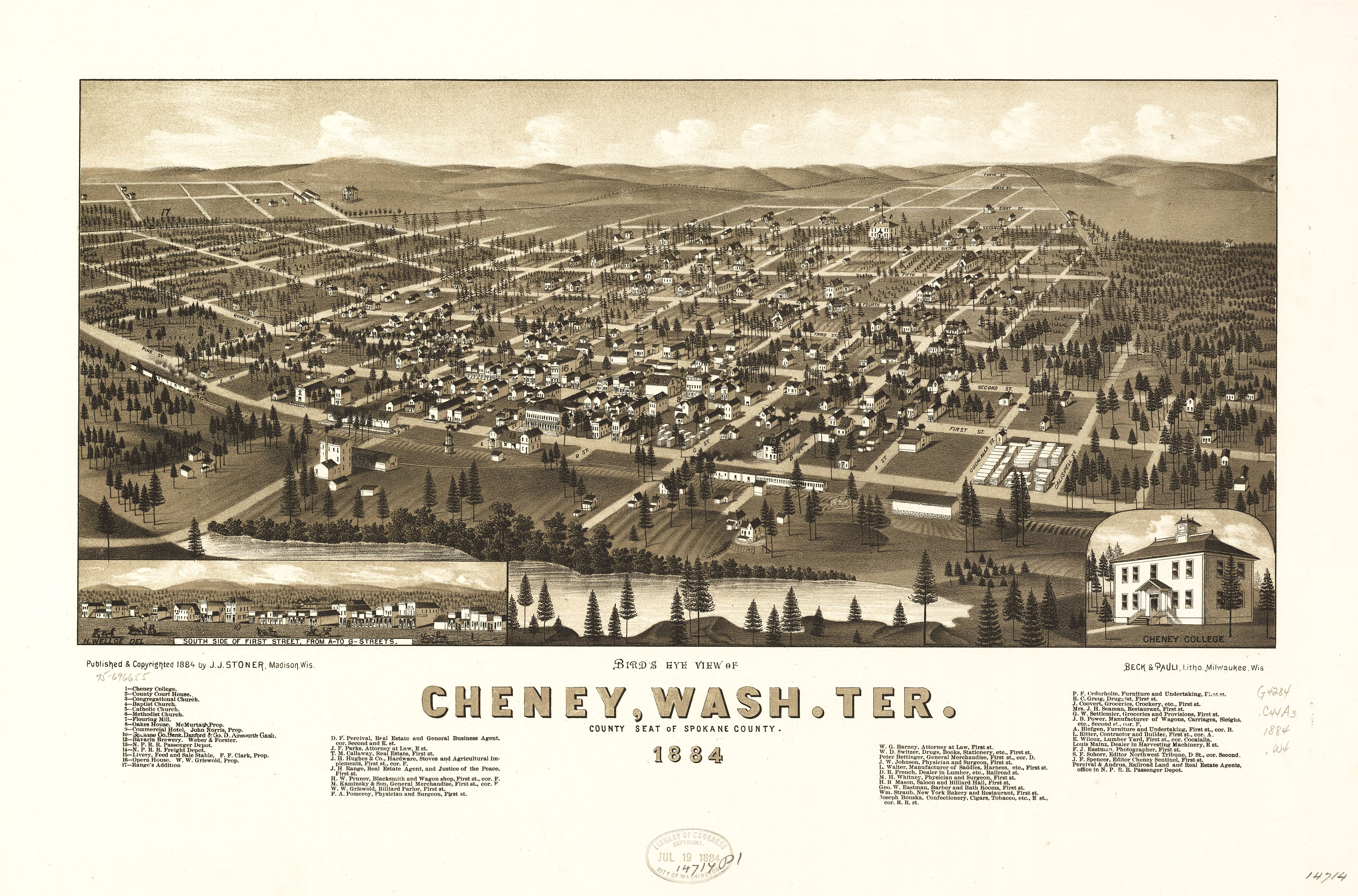
Depiction of Cheney in 1884

Named for Boston railroad tycoon Benjamin Pierce Cheney, Cheney was officially incorporated on November 28, 1883.

The City of Cheney is located in Spokane County and is home to 13,255 residents, according to the 2020 Census. Cheney is proud of its small-town nature, which is enhanced by the diverse influence of Eastern Washington University, a public regional university with over 10,000 full-time students. The Seattle Seahawks of the National Football League held the majority of their summer training camps at EWU, from 1976 to 1985, and again from 1997 through the 2006 training camp.

Cheney developed into the city known today because of its strong ties to education, trail riding, and agriculture. This provided a strong economic base for the community and was the result of a much larger event that took place in the United States. In 1858, the last Native American defense occurred in Eastern Washington. Because isolated Eastern Washington was an area of this Native American unrest during the early part of the territorial period, it was not until the late 1860s and early 1870s that settlers made homes in the area. In the latter part of that decade, settlers attracted by plentiful water and timber and the promise of a railway line made their homes near a group of springs bubbling through a willow copse from the bank where the Burlington Northern (formerly Northern Pacific) depot used to stand.

The name of the community, originally Section Thirteen, became Willow Springs, then became Depot Springs, because of its ties to the railroad, then Billings, in honor of a president of the Northern Pacific Company, and finally Cheney, Washington in honor of Benjamin P. Cheney, a director of the Northern Pacific Railroad.

Benjamin P. Cheney was the eldest son of a blacksmith who was born in 1815 in Hillsborough, New Hampshire. At age 16, he began working as a stagecoach driver between Nashua and Keene. Five years later he had become a stage agent in Boston and soon organized an express between Boston and Montreal. He later consolidated that stagecoach line with others to form the United States and Canada Express Company, which 37 years later he merged with American Express, becoming American Express's largest shareholder. The only time Cheney visited the town of Cheney was on September 18, 1883, following the "Last Spike Ceremony" which was the joining of the eastern and western divisions of the railroad. Cheney made donations to establish the Benjamin P. Cheney Academy in the town. The railroad donated 8 acres (32,000 m^{2}) of land so that the educational facility could be built. In 1880 the railroad was graded through the town, and in 1883 the town was incorporated with the streets laid out in the shape of a triangle with the base parallel to the tracks. The railroad tracks were not in a true east–west line, however, so the original town is askew with the map; the newer part of Cheney was built more to the compass.

After a series of boundary changes caused by legislative acts, Spokane County was created with a permanent county seat still to be selected. Contenders for the honor were Cheney and Spokane Falls (now Spokane). Cheney received a majority of the votes, but due to alleged irregularities at the polls, the election was won by Spokane Falls. When this was taken to court, a circuit court judge agreed to a ballot recount. Such a recount failed to materialize, however, and the citizens of Cheney took matters into their own hands.

On a night when most of the residents of Spokane Falls were at a gala wedding celebration, a delegation of armed "Cheneyites" invaded Auditor's office and took possession of the books, conducted their ballot recount which showed Cheney as the victor, and made off into the darkness with the records. The "Grand Steal" was not contested and was confirmed by a court decision in 1881.

Cheney remained the county seat until 1886 when the faster-growing Spokane Falls again brought the issue to a vote and regained the seat. From this point on, the history of Cheney revolves around the growth of the State Normal School, later Eastern Washington College of Education, later Eastern Washington State College, and finally Eastern Washington University. The fierce determination of Cheney to build and promote its college was largely to regain its lost prestige over the county seat.

When Washington became a state in 1889, Cheney was able to obtain legislation establishing one of the state's normal schools, mandatory under the Enabling Act, in Cheney. Its most convincing argument was that it already had the physical beginnings of a normal school in the Benjamin P. Cheney Academy.

Disagreement between legislators and governors resulted in three appropriation vetoes for the normal school in the next 25 years, but in each case, the citizens of Cheney somehow raised the funds to keep the college going until the next legislative session. The growth of the Cheney Normal School and the transformation of the frontier land into a thriving community were the basis for the changing attitudes in this area. The innovators who created the small community atmosphere were the women of the frontier. All of the energies that were once focused on making the West home for their families were transformed into creating a vision of preferred lifestyle choices for the youth.

=== The Battle of Four Lakes ===
The Battle of Four Lakes was a battle during the Coeur d'Alene War of 1858 in the Washington Territory (now the states of Washington and Idaho) in the United States. The Coeur d'Alene War was part of the Yakima War, which began in 1855. The battle was fought near present-day Four Lakes, Washington, between elements of the United States Army and a coalition of Native American tribes consisting of Schitsu'umsh (Coeur d'Alene), Palus, Spokan, and Yakama warriors.

== Geography ==
Cheney is located at 47°29′19″N 117°34′43″W (47.488634, -117.578581), at an elevation of 2,400 ft (730 m).

Cheney is at the highest point on the railroads between Spokane and Portland and sits atop the route of the gentlest gradient from the Spokane Valley to the Columbia Plateau, which was the reason for much of its early growth and railroad activity. The town is built on rolling Palouse hills overlooking Channeled Scablands carved out by the pre-historic Missoula Floods to the south and east. These scablands now host "pothole" lakes and wetlands, and are home to Turnbull National Wildlife Refuge. There are numerous lakes, along with the Spokane River and Little Spokane River, that are located within 20 miles (32 km) of Cheney that provide abundant recreational opportunities such as boating, swimming, water skiing, and fishing.

According to the United States Census Bureau, the city has a total area of 4.30 square miles (11.14 km^{2}), of which, 4.27 square miles (11.06 km^{2}) is land and 0.03 square miles (0.08 km^{2}) is water.

Nearby cities and towns

- Spokane
- Medical Lake
- Airway Heights
- Four Lakes

=== Climate ===
Cheney is located on the edge of the semi-arid region leading up to the foothills of the Selkirk Mountains, where the summers are hot and dry, and winters are cold, wet, and windy.

Climate data for Cheney
Month	Jan	Feb	Mar	Apr	May	Jun	Jul	Aug	Sep	Oct	Nov	Dec	Year
Record high °F (°C)	60 (16)	64 (18)	72 (22)	89 (32)	93 (34)	105 (41)	107 (42)	101 (38)	109 (43)	90 (32)	75 (24)	73 (23)	109 (43)
Mean daily maximum °F (°C)	33.9 (1.1)	40.8 (4.9)	49.2 (9.6)	61.6 (16.4)	69.4 (20.8)	76.2 (24.6)	86.6 (30.3)	83.9 (28.8)	75.5 (24.2)	61.5 (16.4)	45.5 (7.5)	36.9 (2.7)	60.1 (15.6)
Mean daily minimum °F (°C)	19.8 (−6.8)	23.6 (−4.7)	27.8 (−2.3)	33.9 (1.1)	40.3 (4.6)	45.7 (7.6)	51.9 (11.1)	50.7 (10.4)	45.5 (7.5)	36 (2)	28.3 (−2.1)	23.8 (−4.6)	35.6 (2.0)
Record low °F (°C)	−35 (−37)	−29 (−34)	−4 (−20)	14 (−10)	21 (−6)	26 (−3)	31 (−1)	30 (−1)	25 (−4)	14 (−10)	4 (−16)	−6 (−21)	−35 (−37)
Average precipitation inches (mm)	2.27 (58)	1.8 (46)	1.37 (35)	1.06 (27)	1.51 (38)	1.41 (36)	0.57 (14)	0.46 (12)	0.98 (25)	1.5 (38)	2.37 (60)	2.21 (56)	17.51 (445)
Average snowfall inches (cm)	14 (36)	8.4 (21)	3.6 (9.1)	0.4 (1.0)	0 (0)	0 (0)	0 (0)	0 (0)	0 (0)	0.4 (1.0)	3.7 (9.4)	11.8 (30)	42.4 (108)
Average precipitation days (≥ 0.01 inch)	13	10	9	7	7	7	3	3	4	7	11	11	92

== Metropolitan area ==
=== Downtown historic district ===
Located approximately four blocks from the EWU campus, Historic Downtown Cheney offers a traditional mix of retail and service businesses as well as government offices. In 1999, Eastern Washington University, the City of Cheney, and the downtown business community formed a university/community partnership called "Pathways to Progress." Pathways to Progress quickly adopted the tenets and principles of the Main Street approach to downtown revitalization, formed a board of directors, and began the process of becoming a 501c(3) nonprofit corporation. Pathways to Progress is not a registered 501c(3) nonprofit corporation.

Immediately, Pathways to Progress undertook several major projects, including pedestrian streetscape enhancements along First Street (Main Street), and College Avenue. Additionally, Pathways facilitated talks between EWU and a private developer that led to the construction of Brewster Hall, a mixed-use student residence in the downtown core.

Pathways to Progress is no longer an active organization.

Downtown Cheney has since evolved into a more traditional "university district", hosting numerous community festivals, a farmers' market, and businesses catering to the college crowd.

Cheney's downtown area is also home of the Cheney Historical Museum which is dedicated to gathering, preserving, and sharing information and artifacts concerning the history of the Four Lakes, Marshall, Cheney, Tyler, and Amber districts of southwest Spokane County in eastern Washington. Volunteers open the museum at various times by season and by appointment as well as engage in research and preserving and caring for the collection. Another historic site, the Sterling-Moorman House, is also under development.

Downtown Cheney is the region's gateway to the Columbia Plateau Trail and the Fish Lake Trail, both of which explore the unique geology of the Great Ice Age Floods.

=== Fairchild Air Force Base ===
Fairchild Air Force Base, located approximately 7 miles (11 km) north of Cheney and established in 1942, has been a key part of the U.S. defense strategy and its personnel are a substantial portion of the Cheney community. Originally established as a World War II repair depot, it has transitioned over the years from a Strategic Air Command bomber wing during the Cold War, to Air Mobility Command air refueling wing during Operation Iraqi Freedom. Today, Fairchild's aircraft and personnel make up the backbone of the Air Force's airborne refueling tanker fleet on the West Coast. Fairchild's location north of Cheney and 12 miles (19 km) west of Spokane, resulted from a competition with the cities of Seattle and Everett in western Washington. The War Department chose Spokane for several reasons: better weather conditions, the location 300 miles (480 km) from the coast, and the Cascade Range providing a natural barrier against possible Japanese attacks.

Fairchild Air Force Base is also the United States Air Force's primary training facility for Survival, Evasion, Resistance, and Escape Techniques (SERE). SERE is a U.S. military training program developed at the end of the Korean War to provide service members with training in the Code of Conduct, survival skills, evading capture, and dealing with being taken prisoner. It was created by the U.S. Air Force but was expanded to the U.S. Army and the U.S. Navy after the Vietnam War. The SERE school at Fairchild AFB is intended to train aircrews, special forces, and other service members who operate in dangerous areas and are thus more likely to be captured.

== Demographics ==
Historical population
Census	Pop.	Note	%±
1890	647		—
1900	781		20.7%
1910	1,207		54.5%
1920	1,252		3.7%
1930	1,335		6.6%
1940	1,551		16.2%
1950	2,797		80.3%
1960	3,173		13.4%
1970	6,358		100.4%
1980	7,630		20.0%
1990	7,723		1.2%
2000	8,832		14.4%
2010	10,590		19.9%
2020	13,255		25.2%
U.S. Decennial Census

The education level of residents in Cheney of the age of 25 is:

- High school or higher: 95.6%
- Bachelor's degree or higher: 42.3%
- Graduate or professional degree: 13.1%

=== 2020 census ===
As of the 2020 census, Cheney had a population of 13,255. The median age was 22.9 years. 15.3% of residents were under the age of 18 and 7.9% of residents were 65 years of age or older. For every 100 females there were 95.8 males, and for every 100 females age 18 and over there were 95.2 males age 18 and over.

99.4% of residents lived in urban areas, while 0.6% lived in rural areas.

There were 4,900 households in Cheney, of which 23.3% had children under the age of 18 living in them. Of all households, 26.6% were married-couple households, 29.4% were households with a male householder and no spouse or partner present, and 32.4% were households with a female householder and no spouse or partner present. About 33.2% of all households were made up of individuals and 6.6% had someone living alone who was 65 years of age or older.

There were 5,354 housing units, of which 8.5% were vacant. The homeowner vacancy rate was 0.4% and the rental vacancy rate was 7.2%.

Racial composition as of the 2020 census
Race	Number	Percent
White	9,679	73.0%
Black or African American	532	4.0%
American Indian and Alaska Native	234	1.8%
Asian	438	3.3%
Native Hawaiian and Other Pacific Islander	99	0.7%
Some other race	814	6.1%
Two or more races	1,459	11.0%
Hispanic or Latino (of any race)	1,780	13.4%

=== 2010 census ===
As of the 2010 census, there were 10,590 people, 3,902 households, and 1,669 families residing in the city. The population density was 2,480.1 inhabitants per square mile (957.6/km^{2}). There were 4,183 housing units at an average density of 979.6 per square mile (378.2/km^{2}). The racial makeup of the city was 81.7% White, 4.0% African American, 1.3% Native American, 4.0% Asian, 0.4% Pacific Islander, 3.9% from other races, and 4.7% from two or more races. Hispanic or Latino of any race were 9.3% of the population.

There were 3,902 households, of which 21.7% had children under the age of 18 living with them, 28.0% were married couples living together, 10.5% had a female householder with no husband present, 4.3% had a male householder with no wife present, and 57.2% were non-families. 30.0% of all households were made up of individuals, and 6.1% had someone living alone who was 65 years of age or older. The average household size was 2.30 and the average family size was 2.89.

The median age in the city was 22.3 years. 14.7% of residents were under the age of 18; 48.6% were between the ages of 18 and 24; 17.8% were from 25 to 44; 12.4% were from 45 to 64; and 6.7% were 65 years of age or older. The gender makeup of the city was 48.8% male and 51.2% female.

=== 2000 census ===
As of the 2000 census, there were 8,832 people, 3,108 households, and 1,529 families residing in the city. The population density was 2,161.0 people per square mile (833.8/km^{2}). There were 3,293 housing units at an average density of 805.7 per square mile (310.9/km^{2}). The racial makeup of the city was 85.28% White, 2.11% African American, 1.32% Native American, 6.34% Asian, 0.35% Pacific Islander, 1.71% from other races, and 2.89% from two or more races. Hispanic or Latino of any race were 4.35% of the population.

There were 3,108 households, out of which 25.7% had children under the age of 18 living with them, 34.6% were married couples living together, 11.8% had a female householder with no husband present, and 50.8% were non-families. 30.4% of all households were made up of individuals, and 5.2% had someone living alone who was 65 years of age or older. The average household size was 2.30, and the average family size was 2.97.

In the city, the age distribution of the population shows 18.2% under the age of 18, 41.0% from 18 to 24, 21.6% from 25 to 44, 12.9% from 45 to 64, and 6.2% who were 65 years of age or older. The median age was 23 years. For every 100 females, there were 88.2 males. For every 100 females age 18 and over, there were 85.7 males.

The median income for a household in the city was $22,593, and the median income for a family was $37,935. Males had a median income of $27,745 versus $23,375 for females. The per capita income for the city was $12,566. About 20.1% of families and 30.9% of the population were below the poverty line, including 25.4% of those under age 18 and 6.7% of those age 65 or over.

== Economy ==
Once a booming railroad town and county seat, Cheney is a bedroom community to the city of Spokane. Many people who live in Cheney work and shop in Spokane, while over half of the student population at Eastern Washington University commutes to classes in Cheney daily. Cheney has its distinctive economic characteristics, but its fortunes and growth are tightly linked to the greater economy of the Inland Northwest. Eastern Washington University is the single largest employer in Cheney, followed by the Cheney School District and city government. In the private sector, healthcare dominates the employment base, followed closely by farming and agriculture with the principal crops being dryland grain crops like wheat, barley, and peas along with a substantial amount of hay production.

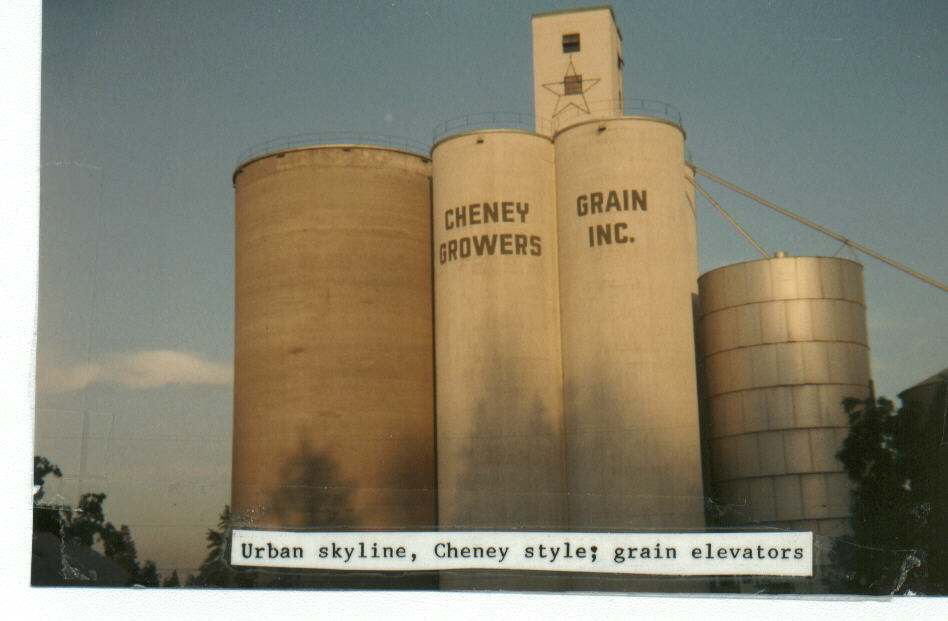
Grain elevators that are prominent in the Cheney skyline

With Cheney located just 15 miles (24 km) southwest of Spokane, the city has seen some significant growth since the mid and late 1990s, which continues today as the Spokane area continues growing. Much of the growth and development has taken place in the northern part of the city, where Interstate 90 enters Cheney. I-90 is the main thoroughfare between Cheney and Spokane. Over the years, this area has seen the development of several new businesses and restaurants, including a new shopping center with a supermarket, restaurants and a credit union. The city has seen residential growth with the addition of several apartments and housing subdivisions.

The city hopes to help attract more businesses and high-tech industries by installing a fiber-optic network that will eventually connect to all businesses in the city as well as developing a technology business park . The city has recently started renovating its historic downtown and has connected downtown to the university with a pedestrian-only walkway that stretches the few blocks between the two.

Eastern Washington University is the fastest-growing university in the state of Washington and has seen several new buildings built or renovated on campus, upgrades to and beautification of the campus, a new residential hall built, and a renovation of the football stadium.

=== Cost of living ===
The following cost of living indices are based on a US average of 100. A component amount below 100 means Cheney has a lower cost than the US average. A component amount above 100 means Cheney has a higher cost.

Overall, Cheney's cost of living index is 94.07.

Cost of living component	Cheney	United States average
Overall	94	100
Food	105	100
Utilities	75	100
Miscellaneous	106	100

The median home cost in Cheney is approximately $202,400.

== Arts and culture ==
=== Cheney Rodeo Days ===
Cheney Rodeo Days is held the second weekend in July each year and has been a major annual event for the community since 1967. The event is put on by the Cheney Rodeo Association and includes three days of rodeo competition held at the rodeo grounds just north of Cheney. Cheney Federal Credit Union sponsors the Happy Hoofers Fun Run in conjunction with Rodeo weekend, and the City of Cheney holds the Cheney Rodeo Days Parade through the Main Street of downtown along with a street fair. The Cheney Rodeo features over $40,000 in prize money, rodeo stock from the National Finals Rodeo, and is a professional rodeo event that is part of the Columbia River Prorodeo Circuit which is part of the Professional Rodeo Cowboys Association, that professional cowboys can use to qualify to join the Dodge National Circuit Finals Rodeo, and potentially further qualify for a chance to compete at the National Finals Rodeo, the rodeo world championships.

=== Cheney Farmers' Market ===
Cheney Farmers' Market is held each Saturday from June 1 through September 14. Located in downtown Cheney, the annual Market provides a wide variety of regionally grown and prepared products and produce pieces from local artisans, and handcrafted goods. The market encourages the community to get to know the local farmers and learn about local food sources. Local farmers come to the market to help the community understand how food is grown and where it comes from.

=== Eastern Regional Branch of the Washington State Archives ===
Cheney is home to the Eastern Regional Branch of the Washington State Archives, which provides archival and records management services to local government agencies throughout Adams, Asotin, Columbia, Ferry, Garfield, Lincoln, Pend Oreille, Spokane, Stevens, Walla Walla and Whitman counties in the state of Washington. Eastern Region's collections include: Local government records include those from county offices such as the Auditor, the Clerk, the Treasurer, the Board of Commissioners, and from municipalities, school districts, and other service districts. Only a small percentage of the records created by these offices are transferred to the State Archives as archival records. They are selected as archival for their value as legal and historical evidence of policy development, implementation, and effect. The transfer of records to the State Archives is an ongoing process. Some historical records remain with their originating office pending future transfer to the archives. Collections span the years from the territorial period to the present and include school census records, tax assessment rolls, court dockets and case files, photographs, maps, plats, and engineering drawings. The Archives building is located on the campus of Eastern Washington University.

== Parks and recreation ==
The City of Cheney has several of significant and well-maintained public parks. Currently, there are seven public parks inside the city limits with land set aside for the addition of two more soon to accommodate Cheney's substantial recent growth. The current parks are:

- City Park - picnic and barbecue facilities, playground equipment, and restrooms
- Centennial Park - two soccer fields, picnic and barbecue facilities, and a horseshoe pit.
- Hagelin Park - picnic and barbecue facilities, playground equipment, restrooms, outdoor swimming pool, tennis courts, volleyball courts, and soccer fields.
- Hibbard Park - basketball court and playground equipment
- Moos Field - two baseball fields, a soccer field, and restroom facilities
- Salnave Park - two soccer fields, two softball fields, a baseball field, playground equipment, a basketball court, tennis courts, restrooms, and picnic and barbecue facilities.
- Sutton Park - playground equipment, restrooms, and a gazebo.

=== Local recreation programs ===
The City of Cheney has a wide variety of recreation programs that are available in addition to the park facilities listed above. These programs and activities are administered by a coalition made up of the city and county government agencies and local non-profit organizations. The activities in these programs range from basketball, baseball, softball gymnastics, karate, day camps, and arts & crafts for youth and children to adult sports leagues and educational and field trips for senior citizens, along with a summer concert and movie series that is held at Sutton Park. The recreation programs run by local non-profit organizations include:

- Cheney Waves Aquatic Team
- Cheney Cooperative Preschool
- Cheney Storm Soccer Club
- West Plains Little League Association
- Spokane Youth Sports Association (soccer and baseball)
- Hunter Safety Courses
- Boy Scouts / Girl Scouts

=== Columbia Plateau Trail State Park ===
The Columbia Plateau State Park Trail is a 130-mile-long (210 km), 20-foot-wide (6.1 m) corridor in eastern Washington state maintained as part of the Washington State Park system. The rail trail runs along the abandoned right-of-way of the former Spokane, Portland and Seattle Railway.

There are four access points to the trail near Cheney: Fish Lake Trailhead (Milepost 365), Cheney Trailhead (Milepost 361.25), Amber Lake Trailhead (Milepost 349.25), Martin Road Trailhead (Milepost 342). The section between the Fish Lake and Cheney trailheads is paved; the rest is gravel.

=== Turnbull National Wildlife Refuge ===
The Turnbull National Wildlife Refuge is located six miles (10 km) south of Cheney, Washington, on the eastern edge of the Columbia Basin in Spokane County in northeastern Washington. Turnbull NWR encompasses more than 23,000 acres (9,300 ha) of the Channeled Scablands. The ecosystem that predominates the refuge is unique within the National Wildlife Refuge System and has characteristics that distinguish it from natural reserves worldwide. The combination of basalt outcrops, channeled canyons, and ponderosa pine forests infused in a diverse landscape of over 130 marshes, wetlands, and lakes creates an environment of aesthetic beauty as well as high quality wildlife habitat. The refuge is named for Cyrus Turnbull who lived on the site in the 1880s.

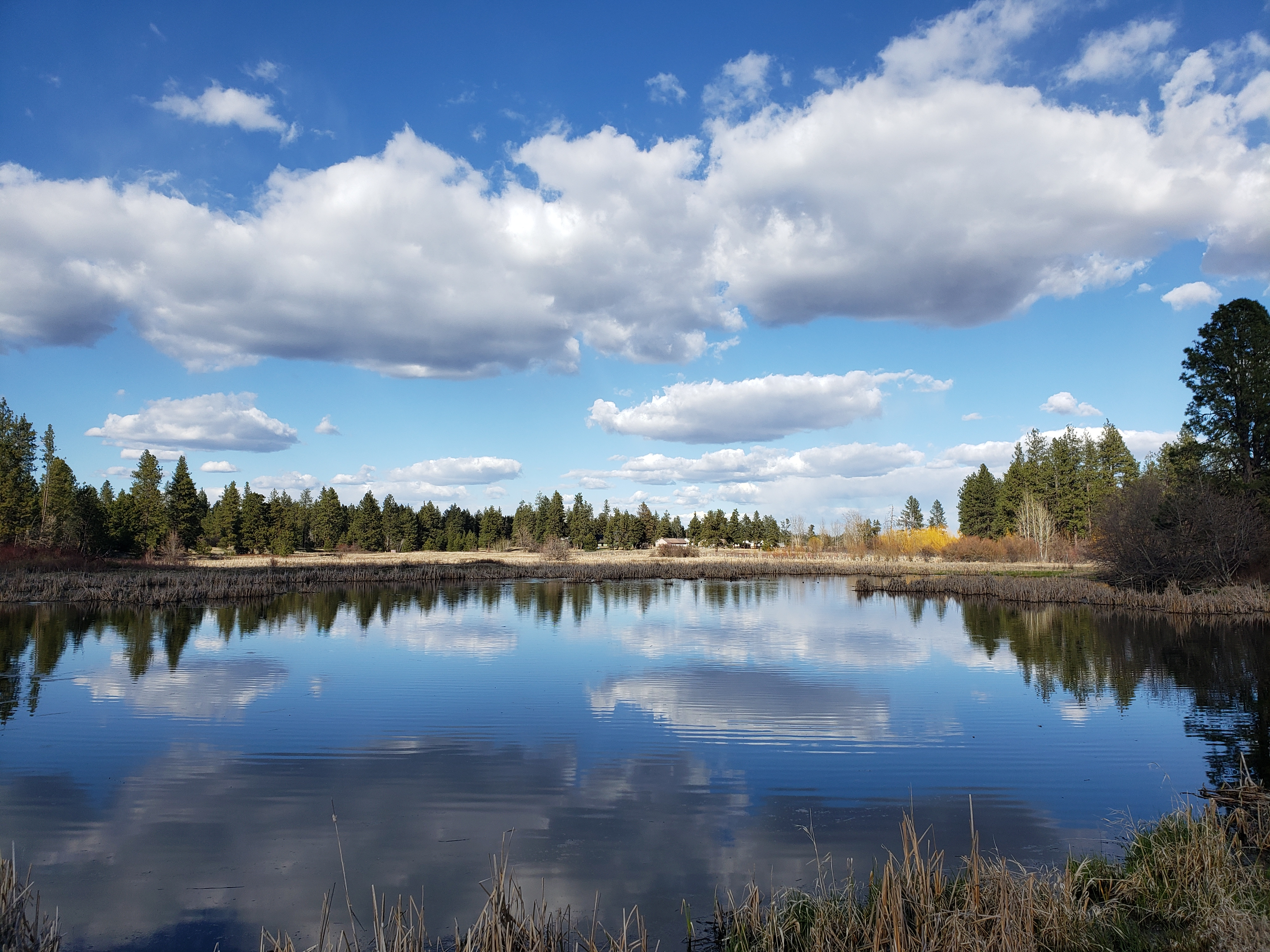
A view of Winslow Pool and the Turnbull NWR Visitor Center from the Pine Lake Loop Trail

The Columbia Plateau Trail provides access to the refuge. The Pine Lake Loop Trail, designated a National Recreation Trail in 2006, provides 1.25 miles (2.01 km) of wheelchair-accessible hiking along Winslow Pool and around Pine Lake.

=== Nearby recreation opportunities ===
There are multiple recreational opportunities and events near the city of Cheney that include:

- Golf at the Fairway's Golf Course located 5 miles (8.0 km) northwest of Cheney. The Fairway is a Par 72, 18-hole championship golf course laid out in a links-style format.
- Lilac Bloomsday Run - A 7.46-mile (12.01 km) road race held in Spokane on the first Sunday in May each year. This is the 4th largest road run in America with over 60,000 participants every year.
- Spokane Hoopfest - The world's largest 3 on 3 outdoor basketball tournament held the last weekend of June each year in downtown Spokane. Each year about 6,000 teams comprising over 24,000 competitors participate in this annual tournament.
- Snow skiing at four different local ski areas: Mount Spokane Ski and Snowboard Park, 49 Degrees North, Schweitzer Mountain, and Silver Mountain, Idaho.
- Whitewater rafting, kayaking, and hiking at Riverside State Park. Riverside State Park is about 10 miles (16 km) east of Cheney and provides numerous out recreation activities. It is host to a unique series of basalt geologic formations in and about the Spokane River which provide the environment for excellent whitewater rafting and rock climbing.

== Government ==
The City of Cheney's government operates under a strong mayor-council form of government. The Mayor is elected by the community at large every four years, and the City Council consists of seven members who are also elected to serve in four-year terms. The Mayor performs as the chief executive officer and the City Council performs the legislative functions.

The City Council meets every second and fourth Tuesday of the month at 6:00 PM. Meetings are conducted in the City Council Chambers in City Hall, located at 609 Second Street. An agenda of the upcoming City Council meeting is posted in City Hall on the Friday before the regularly scheduled City Council meeting. Cheney's current elected officials and key administrators are:

=== Mayor ===
- Elsa Martin

=== City Council ===
- Vincent Barthels
- Ryan Gaard
- Dan Hilton
- Teresa Overhauser
- Mark Posthuma
- Paul Schmidt
- Jill Weiszmann

The City Council makes final decisions regarding policy and fiscal matters and is assisted by some advisory committees that include:

- Planning Commission: A seven-member commission chosen by the City Council and Mayor that is charged with dealing with matters affecting long-range planning and urban growth.
- Parks Board: A seven-member commission chosen by the City Council and Mayor that is charged with identifying recreation needs in the community, recommending policies related to parks and recreation operations to the City Council and Mayor, and reviewing proposals presented by city government staff.
- Youth Commission: The Youth Commission is composed of high school and junior high school students who advise the City Council and Mayor on the needs and issues affecting youth in the community.
- Historic Preservation Commission: A seven-member commission chosen by the City Council and Mayor that is charged with the identification and preservation of community cultural resources through the inventory and registry of historic places.

=== Departments ===
The actual administration of the government is operated under a city administrator who oversees several departments that include:

- Community Development Department
- Finance Department
- Fire Department
- Light Department
- Municipal Court
- Parks & Recreation Department
- Police Department
- Public Works Department

Regularly scheduled interdepartmental meetings are held to coordinate the activities of Cheney's government.

=== State ===
In the Washington State Legislature, Cheney is located in the 6th Legislative District. It is currently represented in the Washington State Senate by Republican Michael Baumgartner. In the Washington House of Representatives, Cheney is represented by Republican Kevin Parker in Position #1 and Republican Jeff Holy in Position #2.

=== Federal ===
Cheney is located in Washington's 5th congressional district for representation in the United States Congress. The 5th congressional district in Washington has a Cook Partisan Voting Index of R+7 and is represented in the House of Representatives by Republican Michael Baumgartner and in the Senate is represented by two Democrats, Patty Murray, and Maria Cantwell.

== Education ==
=== Cheney School District ===
The primary and secondary public schools in the City of Cheney are run by Cheney School District. Cheney public schools spend $5,688 per student in annual education costs. The average annual school expenditure in the United States is $6,058 per student. The student-teacher ratio in Cheney public schools is approximately 25-35 students per teacher. The district operates seven schools and a partnership program that supports K-8 homeschool students.

=== Eastern Washington University ===
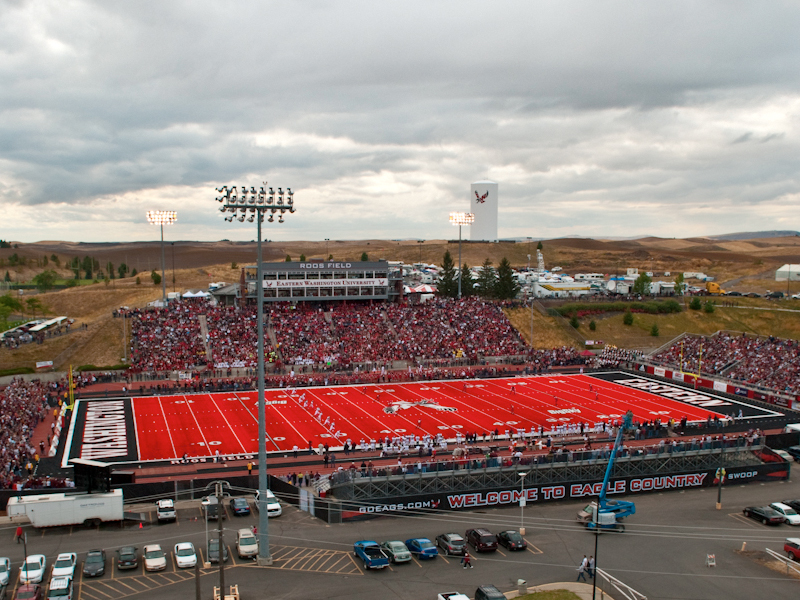
Roos Field

Founded in 1882, as the Benjamin P. Cheney Academy, it opened its doors to more than 200 enrolling students.

The academy became the Washington State Normal School at Cheney in 1889, the same year in which Washington was given its statehood. By the time it became Eastern Washington College of Education in 1937, Eastern was already a fully accredited four-year, degree-granting institution, offering majors in numerous subjects. The campus grew rapidly in size and program offerings in the decades following World War II. In 1961, the name was again changed, this time to Eastern Washington State College. It was increasingly evident that the region needed professionals in many fields; in response, Eastern added a wide range of undergraduate and graduate degree programs. Finally, in 1977, the state legislature changed the school's name to Eastern Washington University.

Eastern Washington University is now a regional, comprehensive public university, with programs also offered in Bellevue, Everett, Kent, Seattle, Shoreline, Spokane, Tacoma, Vancouver, and Yakima.

=== Libraries ===
Cheney is served by two libraries:

- Cheney Library is a public library that is a branch of the Spokane County Library District, which is a regional network of 10 libraries with a permanent collection of over 400,000 items, and a staff of 164 employees.
- John F. Kennedy Library at Eastern Washington University is a collegiate research-level library with a staff of 42 employees. It supports the academic and research needs of a major regional university that has undergraduate and graduate students along with research and teaching faculty and the surrounding communities.

== Infrastructure ==
=== Healthcare ===
The city of Cheney's medical and dental needs are serviced by two medical clinics and four dentists. Hospital / surgical services are handled at the three major hospitals located in Spokane.

=== Transportation ===
==== Major highways ====
- Interstate 90
- U.S. Route 2
- U.S. Route 195
- State Route 904 (Lt. Col. Michael P. Anderson Memorial Highway)

==== Airports ====
- Spokane International Airport - International airport located 10 miles (16 km) northeast of Cheney, served by 8 major airlines and three international air cargo companies.
- Felts Field - general aviation airport in Spokane located about 25 miles (40 km) northeast of Cheney, with two concrete runways, and one water-based runway for float planes.

==== Public transportation ====
- Spokane Intermodal Center - Combined Amtrak train station / Greyhound bus terminal located in downtown Spokane, about 16 miles (26 km) northeast of Cheney.
- Public transportation service is provided by the Spokane Transit Authority which provides three fixed routes that serve the City of Cheney and connect it to other destinations throughout the region. Paratransit service is also provided for those whose disability precludes them from accessing fixed routes.

== Notable people ==
- Lt. Col. Michael P. Anderson (born December 25, 1959 – February 1, 2003) astronaut who died as a member of the crew of Space Shuttle Columbia during its disastrous re-entry in February 2003 (see Space Shuttle Columbia disaster).
- Steve Emtman (born April 16, 1970) is a former defensive end/defensive tackle for the National Football League's Washington Redskins, Dallas Cowboys, Miami Dolphins, and Chicago Bears.
- Linda Johns (born 1960) is the author of the Hannah West series of children's mysteries set in Seattle, Washington.
- Clarence D. Martin (June 29, 1886 – August 11, 1955) served two terms as the governor of the state of Washington from 1933 to 1940 as a Democrat.
- Launi Meili (born June 4, 1963) represented the United States at the 1992 Summer Olympics and won the gold medal in women's three-position small-bore rifle shooting at the 1992 Olympics in Barcelona, Spain. There are signs on entryways to the city that honor her contribution to American women's marksmanship.
- Dallas Peck (1929–2005), a noted geologist and vulcanologist, was a native of Cheney. Peck was the Director of the U.S. Geological Survey from 1981 to 1993.
- Comic book artist and writer Todd McFarlane (born March 16, 1961) lived here for a time before achieving fame at Marvel Comics with his works on comic books such as The Incredible Hulk and The Amazing Spider-Man before going off to form Image Comics.
- Lucy Robbins Messer Switzer (1844–1922), temperance activist.

== Places listed on the National Register of Historical Places ==
Properties in Cheney listed on the National Register of Historic Places
Site	Image	Listing Date	Address	Ref#	Notes
Cheney Interurban Depot		Mar 26, 1979	505 2nd St	79002555	aka Cheney Care Center
Cheney Odd Fellows Hall		Oct 25, 1990	321 First St	90001639	
City of Cheney Historic District		Feb 2, 2001	bounded by 5th, C, Front, and F streets	01000062	
Dybdall Gristmill		Jan 11, 1976	10 mi (16 km) south of Cheney at Chapman Lake	76001913	aka Chapman Lake Mill
Italian Rock Ovens		Sep 29, 1976	south of Cheney in Turnbull NWR	76001914	
David Lowe House		Oct 13, 1983	306 F St	83004264	
Sutton Barn		Nov 20, 1975	1/2 mi (0.80 km) southwest of Cheney off U.S. 395	75001871	aka Red Barn
Turnbull Pines Rock Shelter		May 6, 1975	Restricted	75001872	Period of Significance: 1499-1000 AD, 1800–1824, 1825–1849, 1850–1874, 1875–1899
Upper Kepple Rockshelters (45SP7)		Jul 26, 1985	Restricted	85001640	
Washington State Normal School at Cheney Historic District		Oct 1, 1992	Jct. of 5th and C streets	92001287	aka Eastern Washington University Historic District
