= Cheney Interurban Depot =

- Cheney Inerurban Depot
- U.S. National Register of Historic Places
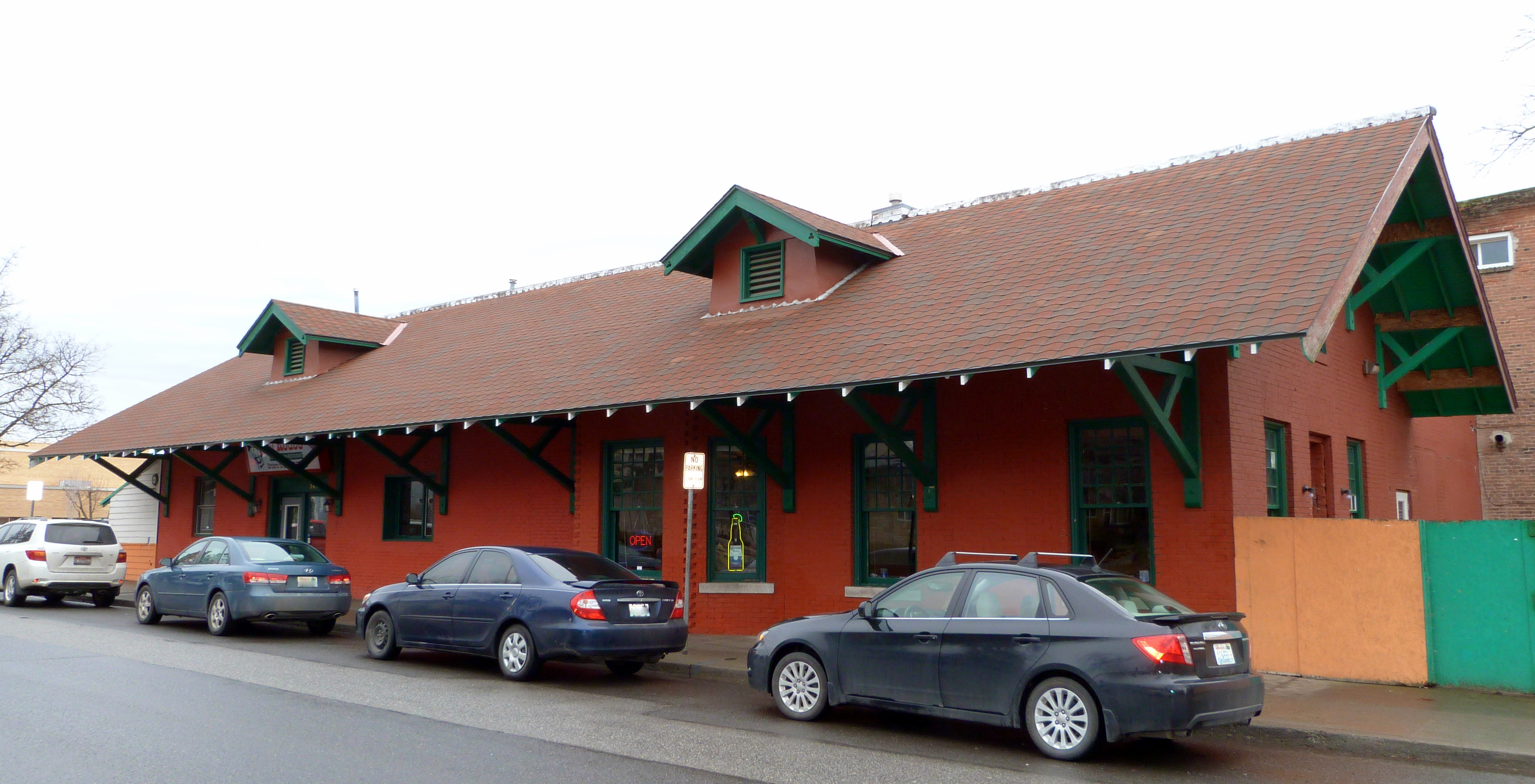
- Location: 505 2nd St. Cheney, Washington
- Coordinates: 47°29′17″N 117°34′32″W
- NRHP reference No.: 79002555
- Added to NRHP: March 26, 1979

Cheney Interurban Depot was an interurban train station in Cheney, Washington, United States. It was built by the Washington Water Power Company in 1907 as the terminus of the line from Spokane. Interurban service ended in 1922, though the station continued use as a bus station until 1939. The depot was listed on the National Register of Historic Places on March 26, 1979. By 2007, the building had been converted into a Mexican restaurant.
