= Cheney Odd Fellows Hall =

- U.S. National Register of Historic Places
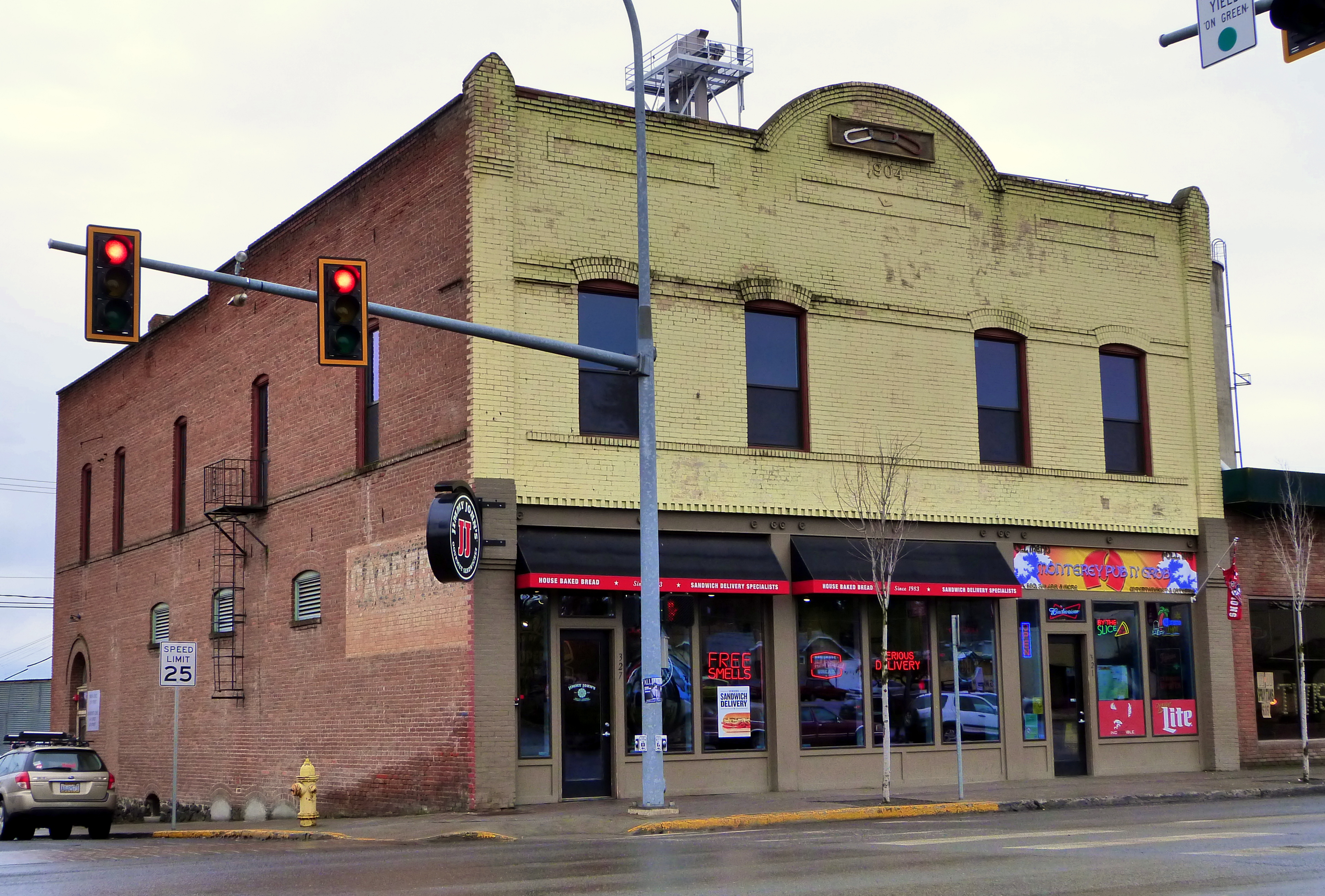
- The Cheney Odd Fellows Hall in 2015

- Location within Washington (state)
- Location: 321 First Street, Cheney, Washington
- Coordinates: 47°29′12″N 117°34′30″W
- Area: less than one acre
- Built: 1904
- Architect: Odd Fellow Building Committee
- Architectural style: Odd Fellows, Late Victorian, Vernacular commercial
- NRHP reference No.: 90001639
- Added to NRHP: October 25, 1990

The Cheney Odd Fellows Hall in Cheney, Washington is a historic building that was built in 1904. It was listed on the National Register of Historic Places in 1990.

It was deemed "historically significant for its association with the community's leading fraternal organization in the early 20th century and is the best preserved example of vernacular commercial architecture from the period." Its NRHP nomination describes it as having been "the venue of the community's most important social events and civic meetings. Today the building is a rare reminder of Cheney's public life during its formative years."
