= North Idaho Centennial Trail =

Hiking trail in Idaho, United States

Coordinates: 47°40′27″N 116°47′23″W

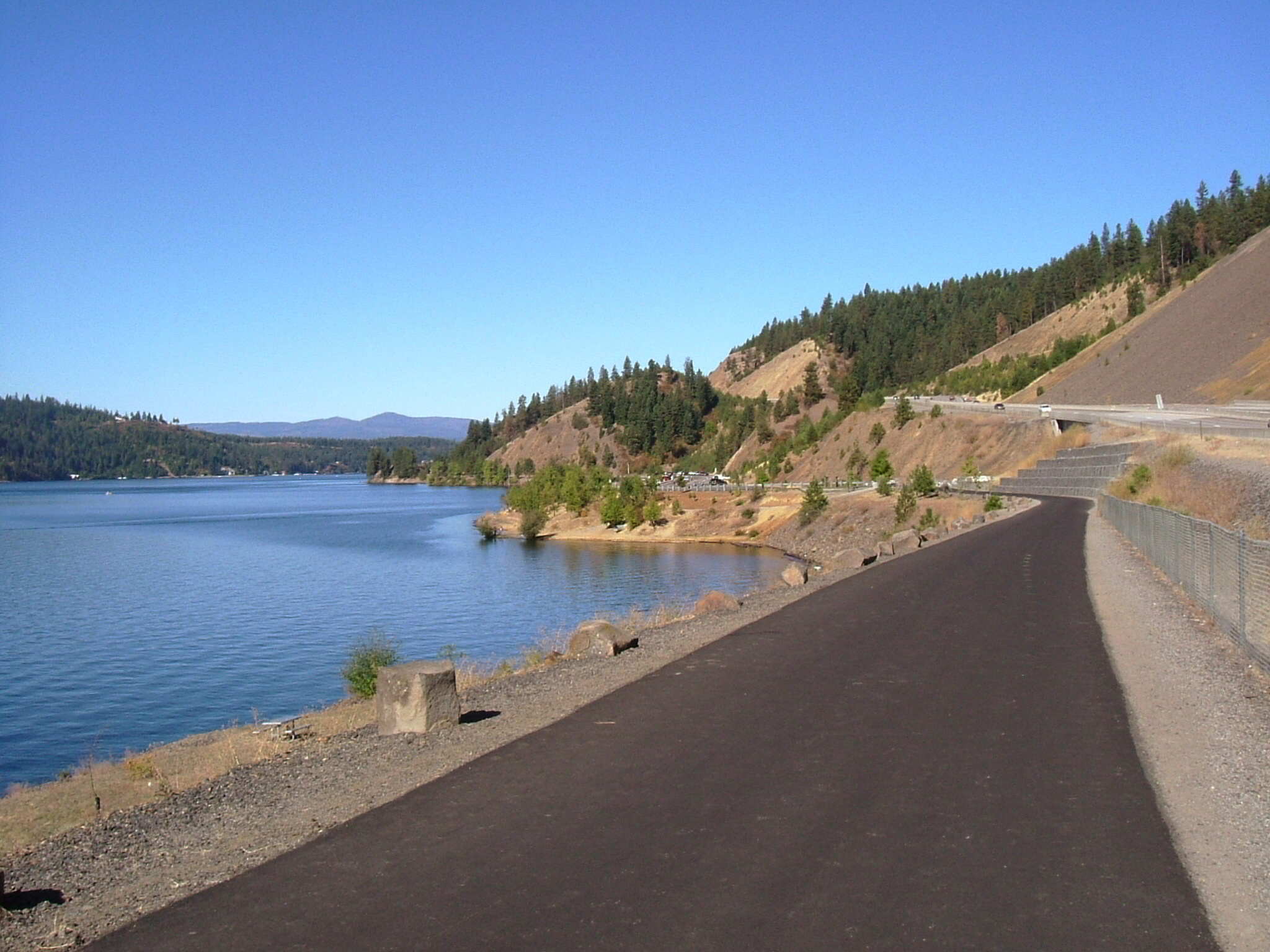
- Length: 24 mi (39 km)
- Location: Kootenai County, Idaho, United States
- Trailheads: Spokane River Centennial Trail at Idaho–Washington border; Higgens Point, Idaho
- Use: Transportation; Recreation: bicycling, walking, jogging, photography
- Season: All year
- Sights: Spokane River; Lake Coeur d'Alene; Higgens Point

The North Idaho Centennial Trail is a 24 miles (39 km) paved trail in Idaho used for transportation and recreational activities. Starting from Higgens Point, a popular spot on the northeast side of Lake Coeur d'Alene for bald eagle watchers in early winter, the trail runs west along the lake's north shoreline to the Spokane River. The trail follows the river to the Idaho–Washington state border, from where it is named the Spokane River Centennial Trail, extending for a further 39 miles (63 km) to Nine Mile Boat Launch in Nine Mile Falls, Washington. The trail passes through the towns of Post Falls, Idaho and Coeur d'Alene, Idaho.

== History ==
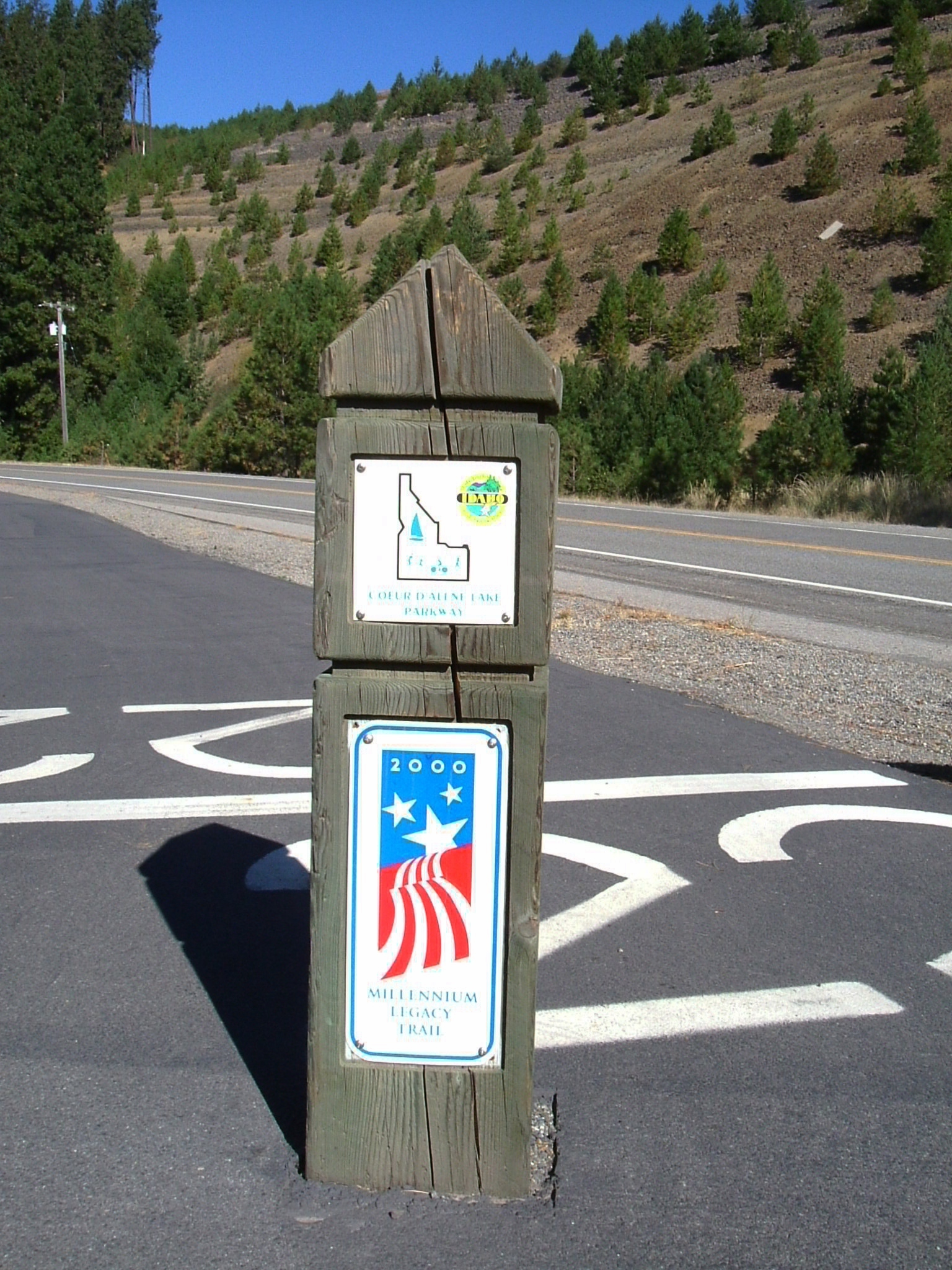
Trail signage

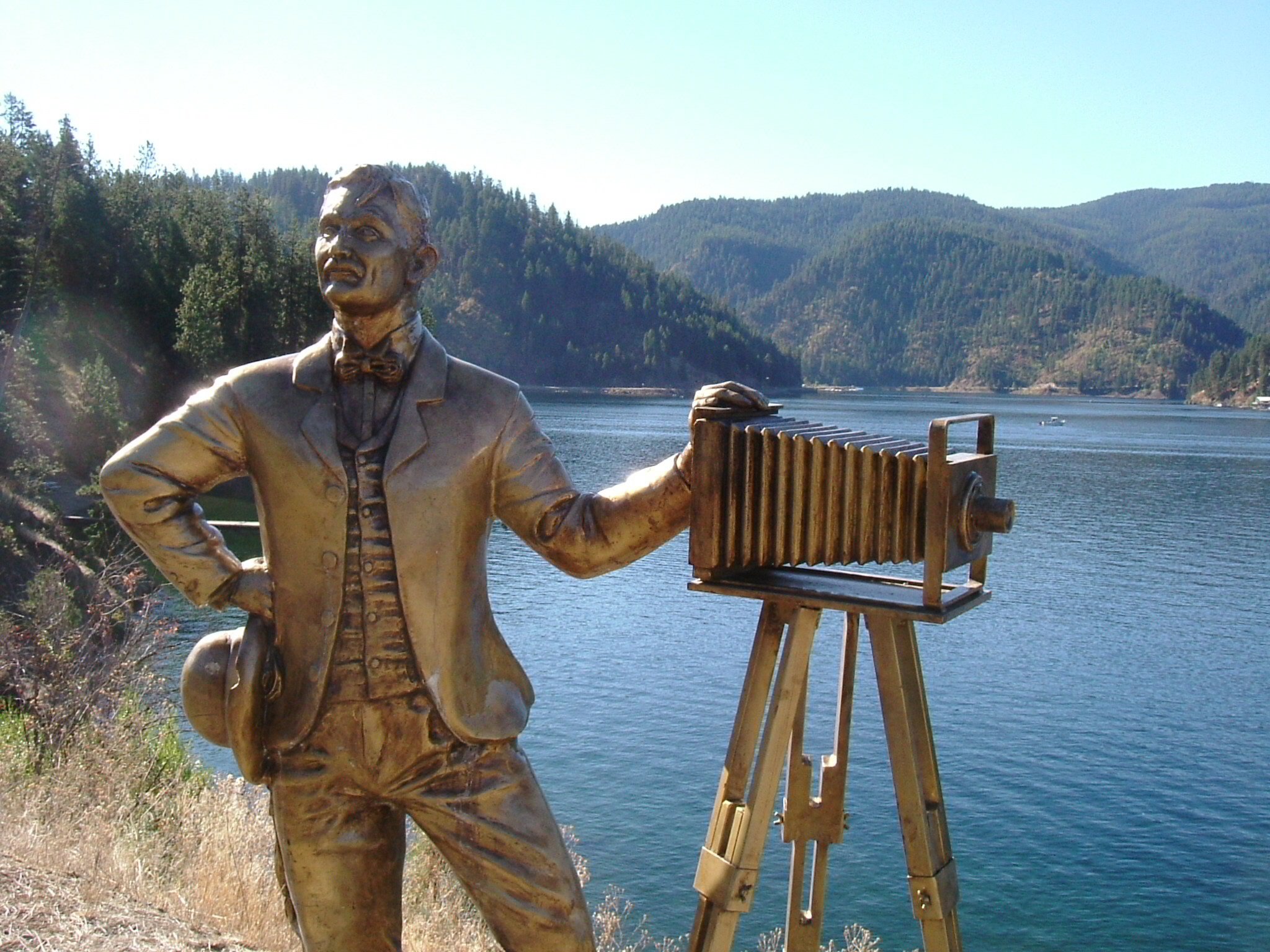
Higgins Point terminus

Following the World's Fair and Expo '74 in Spokane, Washington, the Washington state Parks and Recreation Commission started planning a trail along the Spokane River to celebrate their state's centennial in 1989. Coordination began with Idaho to extend the trail past the border and the northeast side of Lake Coeur d'Alene to celebrate Idaho's centennial as well in 1990. In 2002 local artist David Clemons designed and installed two statues to sit at either end of the trail. "Leopold", an 1890 photographer, sits at Higgens Point and "Kate", a turn of the 20th century bicyclist sat at the state border. Clemons' concept was to capture individuals 100 years ago enjoying the same activities on the trail as they do today. In 2003, "Kate" was vandalized and had to be taken back for repairs. In 2005 she was reinstated on the trail at Riverstone Park, at the beginning of the Spokane River.
