= Coulee Creek =

Watercourse in Washington (U.S. state)

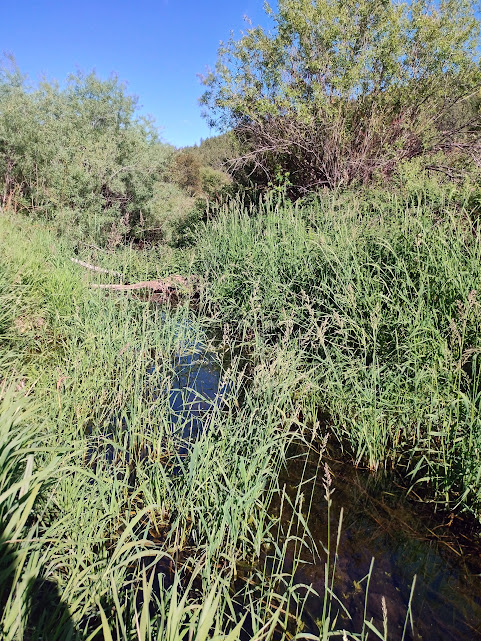
- Coulee Creek. Note the steep canyon wall in the background.

- Location of the mouth of Coulee Creek Coulee Creek (the United States)

Location
- Country: United States
- State: Washington
- County: Spokane

Physical characteristics
- Source
  - location: East of Reardan, Washington
  - coordinates: 47°40′58.59″N 117°48′52.82″W
  - elevation: 2,540 ft (770 m)
- Mouth: Deep Creek
  - location: Deep Creek, Spokane, Washington
  - coordinates: 47°45′7.6″N 117°32′57.8″W
  - elevation: 1,716 ft (523 m)
- Length: 13 mi (21 km)
- Discharge
  - minimum: 0.1 cfs
  - maximum: 3.1 cfs

Basin features
- Progression: Deep Creek → Spokane River → Columbia River → Pacific Ocean
- River system: Columbia River

Coulee Creek a stream of approximately 13 mi (21 km) that originates in the far western edge of Spokane County, and has its mouth at a confluence with Deep Creek, approximately 0.75 miles (1.21 km) before both creeks enter into the Spokane River. The creek flows through mostly rural agricultural areas west of the Spokane urban area, though the mouth is located within state-owned conservation land.

== Geography ==
The upper reaches of Coulee Creek begin in rolling agricultural land to the east of Reardan, Washington along the far western edge of Spokane County, with ephemeral tributaries stretching west across the Lincoln County line. Coulee Creek begins as an ephemeral stream itself, arcing to the northeast. Just west of Wood Road the creek begins to follow an easterly alignment and descends quickly into a steep, narrow valley. Approximately 2.5 miles to the east of Wood Road, Coulee Hite Road descends into the valley of the creek and follows the stream as it winds along the northern edge of Indian Prairie and southern edge of Four Mound Prairie. In this stretch, the valley of the creek falls to below 2,000 feet above sea level while the surrounding prairies to the north and south rise steeply above 2,400 feet. This forms a narrow, though deep canyon for which the creek is channeled through. Coulee Hite Road meets Seven Mile Road approximately one mile upstream of Coulee Creek's confluence with Deep Creek, just to the south of Pine Bluff, roughly three-quarters of a mile from the latter's confluence with the much larger Spokane River.

Unlike many streams, in which flow increases from upstream to downstream, Coulee Creek tends to exhibit a loss of flow as water heads downstream. Water from Coulee Creek gradually infiltrates the subsurface over the course of the stream, and by the confluence with Deep Creek the surface flow is often absent altogether. While surface flow of Coulee Creek into Deep Creek is often constrained to spring snow melt, upstream of this Coulee Creek is considered to be a perennial stream due to consistent input of groundwater from aquifers contained in the Wanapum Basalt which underlies the upper portions of the stream.

== Human use ==
For centuries, the watershed of Coulee Creek was part of the homeland of the Spokane people.

With the arrival of European settlers in the early 1800s, water and land use in the creek's watershed began to change. Early settler activity included the establishment by Isaac Stevens of Camp Washington in 1853. The site of the camp was located in the upper reaches of the watershed where two forks of the creek come together. It was occupied only briefly, from October 17 to 30 of 1853, and served as a base for American party led by Stevens tasked with surveying in the immediate area. Though it was occupied only temporarily, and never in an official capacity, Camp Washington has been referred to as the "first capital" of the Washington Territory. A monument to the camp was erected on the site in 1908 by the Washington State Historical Society. In attendance at the dedication of the monument was then-Governor Albert Mead along with a crowd of 500-some people, including one of the last surviving members of the surveying party that occupied the site, Francis J.D. Wolff.

A barn constructed between 1897 and 1900 by early homesteaders along the lower reaches of the creek has been listed on the Washington State Heritage Barn Register. The homesteaders, Henry Allice and his family, were involved in cutting timber on the land around the lower reaches of the creek. Over the course of the 20th century, Allice's property, like much of the watershed, would be used for dairy cattle and other forms of agriculture like growing hay.

Human use of the Coulee Creek watershed has dramatically altered it from the original natural state. Sampling done in 2010 found phosphorus loads ranging from 0.1 to 1.1 pounds per day in the creek with a median of 0.5 pounds per day. Agriculture now dominates the watershed, and farming has removed natural trees and shrubs from the creek's banks. In 2012, efforts led by the Lands Council were undertaken to return the creek to a more natural state, with a $22,000 grant issued to remove invasive reed canary grass from the banks of Coulee and neighboring Deep Creek and plant 2,500 native plant species in its place.

== Gallery ==
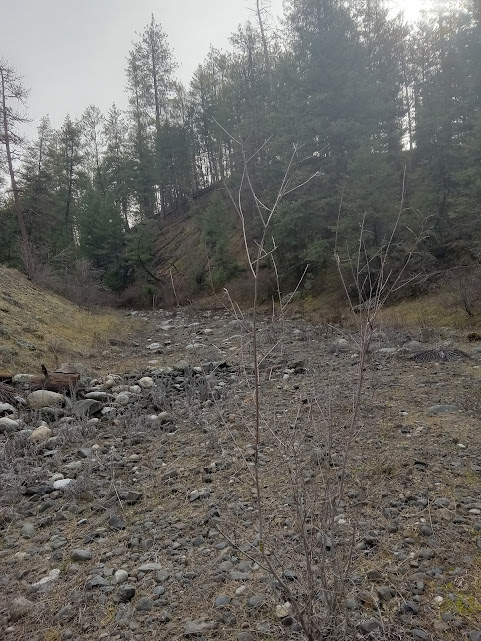
Coulee Creek at the confluence with Deep Creek. Note the absence of water flowing from the creek as well.

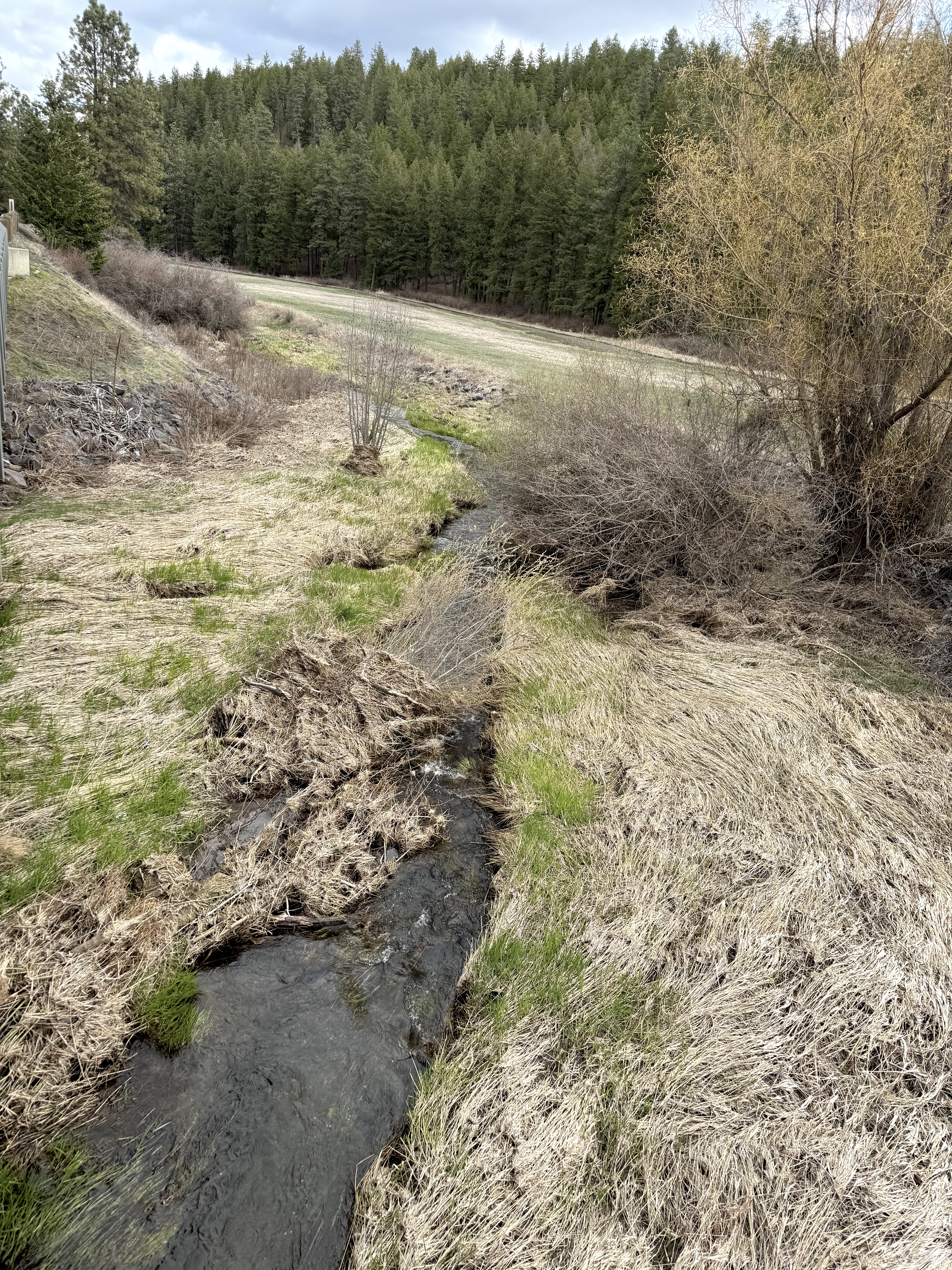
Coulee Creek at Brooks Road looking downstream

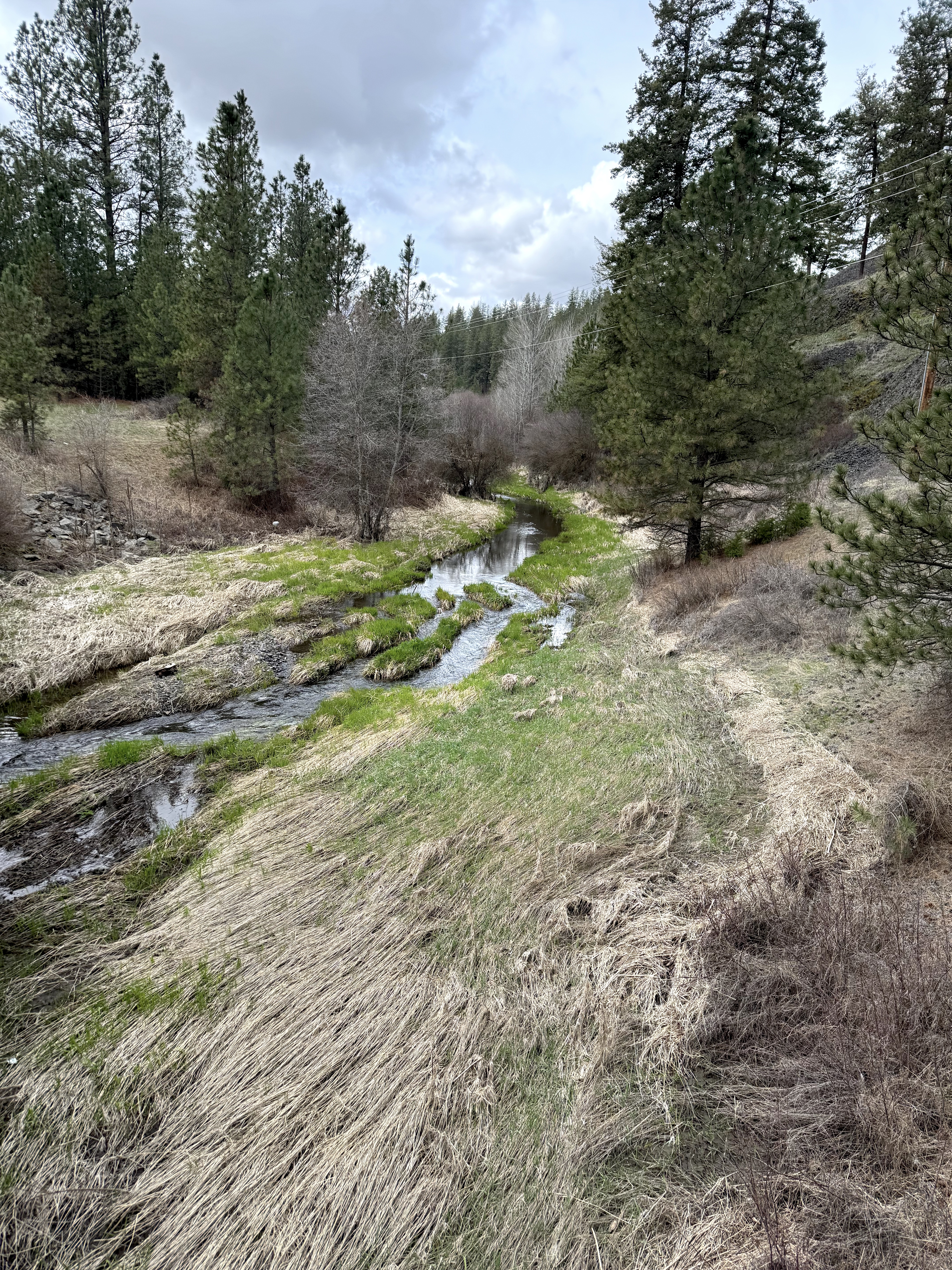
Coulee Creek at Brooks Road looking upstream
