= Spokane River Centennial Trail =

State park and trail in the U.S. state of Washington

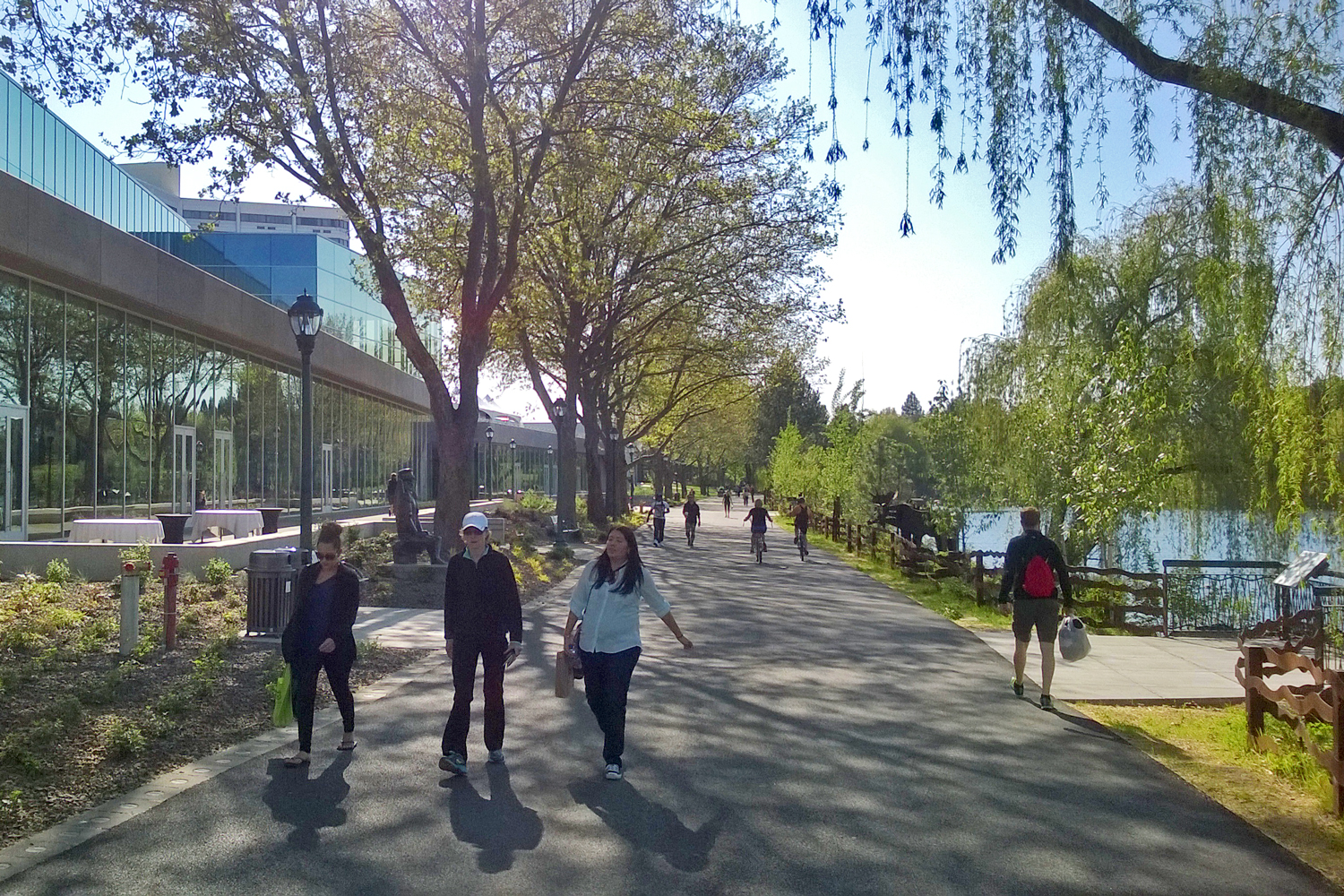
- Trail beside the Spokane Convention Center
- Length: 37 mi (60 km)
- Location: Spokane County, Washington, United States
- Designation: Washington state park
- Trailheads: Nine Mile Recreation Area (47°47′34″N 117°34′01″W); North Idaho Centennial Trail at Idaho/Washington border (47°41′43″N 117°02′30″W)
- Use: Alternate transportation & recreation: bicycling, walking, jogging
- Season: All year
- Sights: Spokane River, Riverside State Park, Riverfront Park
- Surface: Paved
- Maintainer: Washington State Parks and Recreation Commission
- Website: Centennial Trail State Park
Trail map
Location of trailheads in Washington

The Spokane River Centennial Trail is a 39-mile (63 km) paved trail in Eastern Washington for alternate transportation and recreational use. It is managed by Washington State Parks as the Centennial Trail State Park.

The trail extends from Nine Mile Boat Launch in Nine Mile Falls, Washington to the Washington/Idaho border. It passes through the cities of Spokane, Washington, Spokane Valley, Washington, Liberty Lake, Washington and the unincorporated community of Spokane Bridge, before crossing under the Interstate 90 Spokane River Bridge—traveling through Kootenai County, Idaho for approximately 250 feet (76 m)—and then continuing through Washington for about 2,000 feet (1 km), before meeting with the North Idaho Centennial Trail at the Washington–Idaho border. The trail is divided into three sections: Riverside refers to the section of the trail within Riverside State Park, Urban refers to the section within the city of Spokane, and Valley refers the section east of Spokane (almost all of which lies in the Spokane Valley, hence the name). After the border into Idaho, the trail continues as the North Idaho Centennial Trail.

== History ==
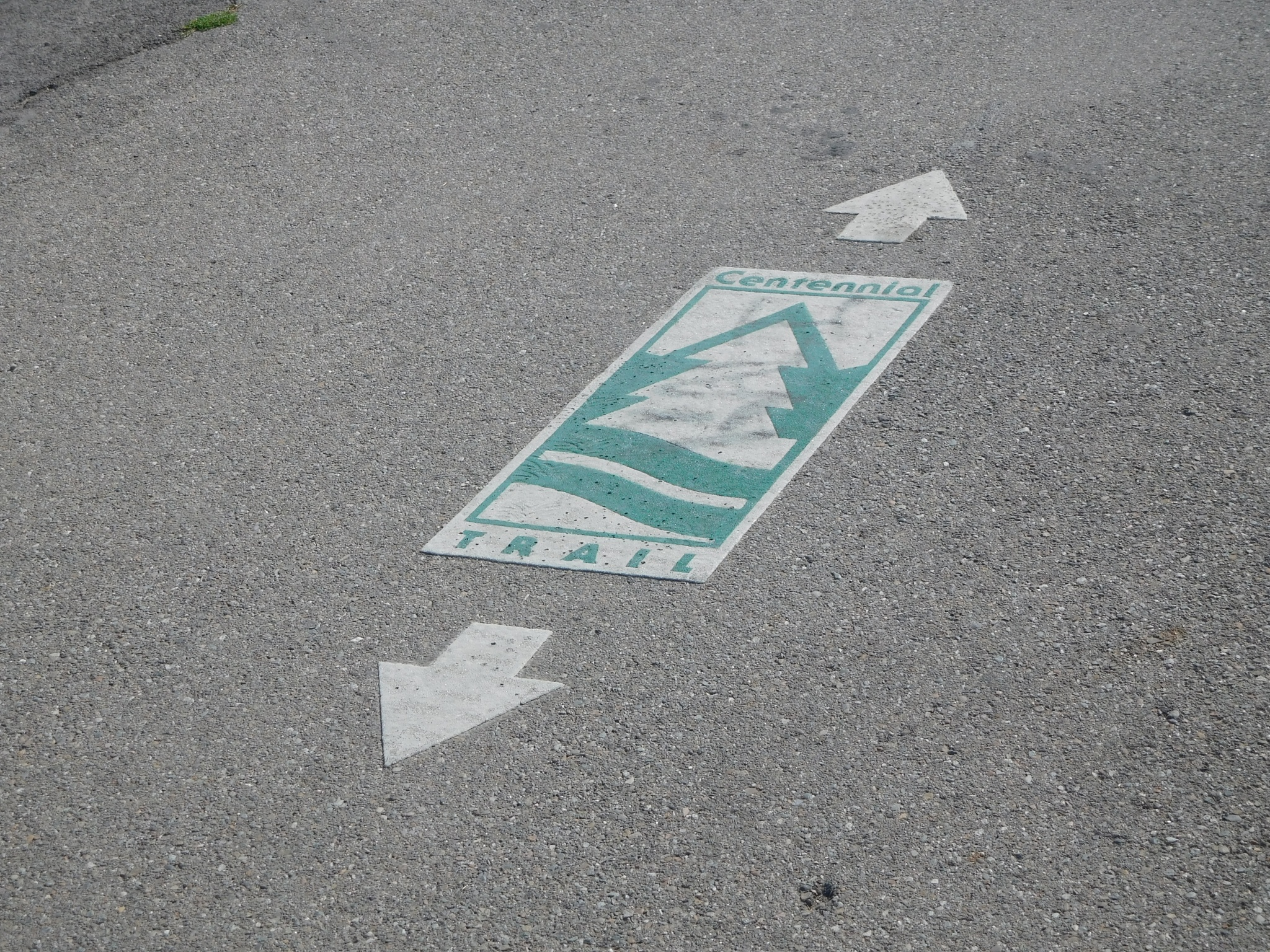
Trail identification

Following the Expo '74, advocates proposed a mixed use pathway along the river. Citizens in Washington and Idaho expanded the idea by 1986 by joining forces and suggesting a much longer trail that could be completed in time to celebrate the respective state centennials of Washington (1989) and Idaho (1990). In 2010, it was designated a National Recreation Trail.
