= Espanola, Washington =

- Unincorporated community
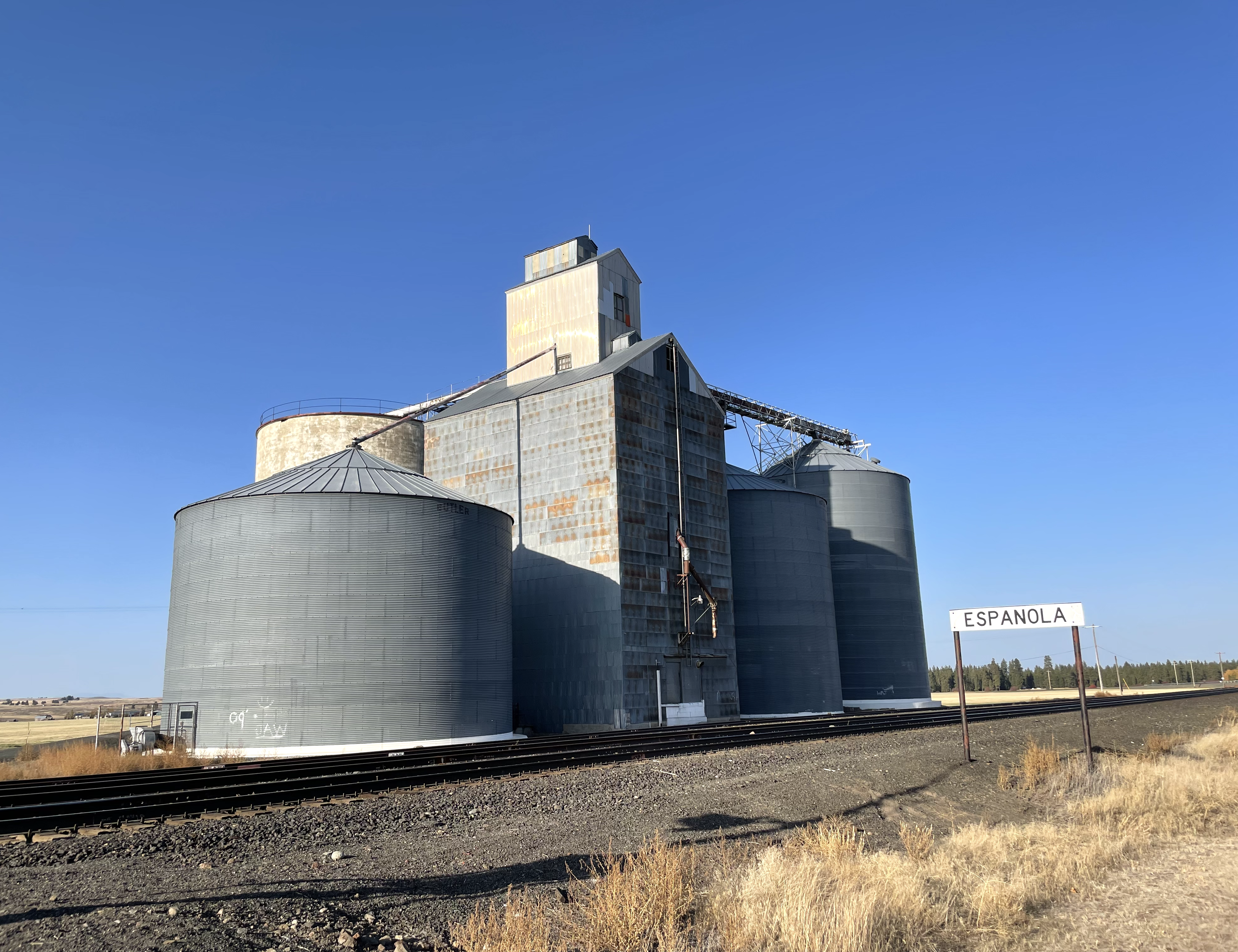

- Location within Washington (state)
- Coordinates: 47°36′12″N 117°44′30″W
- Country: United States
- State: Washington
- County: Spokane
- Elevation: 2,385 ft (727 m)

Population
  - Total: 20
- Time zone: UTC-8 (Pacific (PST))
  - Summer (DST): UTC-7 (PDT)
- ZIP code: 99022
- Area code: 509
- GNIS feature ID: 1510948
- Census Code: 22220
- Census Class Code: U6
- GSA Code: 0684

Espanola is an unincorporated community, in Spokane County, Washington, United States. The current name was adopted in the year 1900. As of 2021 the community of Espanola is little more than a handful of buildings and a grain elevator surrounded by farms.

== History ==
Espanola was the name of one of the 47 townships in Spokane County from the early years of the 20th century through the middle of the century.

A community of Hutterites moved to the Espanola area in 1960, causing some friction with the residents. The Hutterite community is still active in the area as of 2006, but located a few miles to the north beyond U.S. Route 2 near the community of Deep Creek.

== Geography ==
Espanola is located 18 miles west-southwest by road from Downtown Spokane and three miles east of the Spokane–Lincoln county line. The surrounding area is mostly treeless, lightly rolling farmland in the Channeled Scablands of the Columbia Plateau. The city of Medical Lake, the nearest community and closest services to Espanola, is located four miles southeast on Espanola Road. The Washington State Veterans Cemetery is located midway between the two communities. The community of Deep Creek is located four miles to the north. Fairchild Air Force Base is located two miles to the east of Espanola.

A BNSF Railway track, the Columbia River Subdivision passes through Espanola. Surface roads include Manila Road, the road through the community, and Espanola Road, which connects the settlement to the outside world. U.S. Route 2 connects to Espanola Road about three miles north and State Route 902 in Medical Lake.

== Demographics ==
Historical population
Census	Pop.	Note	%±
1910	399		—
1920	318		−20.3%
1930	1,740		447.2%
1940	2,332		34.0%
1950	195		−91.6%
2015 (est.)	20
U.S. Census
