= Riverside State Park =

Park in Washington state

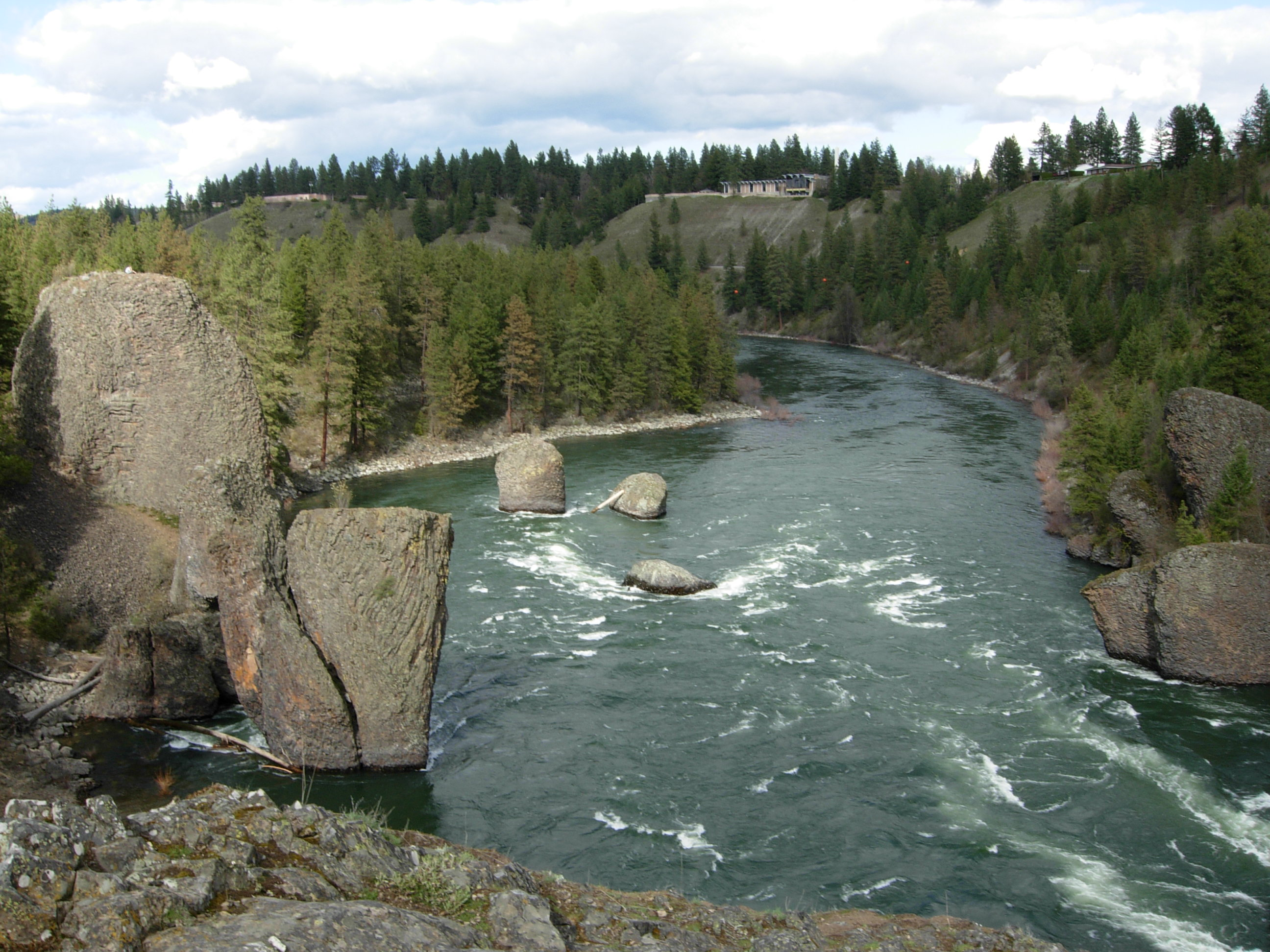
- Park area called the Bowl and Pitcher

- Location within Washington (state) Location within the United States
- Location: Spokane County, Washington, United States
- Coordinates: 47°45′03″N 117°31′57″W
- Area: 9,194 acres (3,721 ha)
- Elevation: 1,857 ft (566 m)
- Established: 1934
- Administrator: Washington State Parks and Recreation Commission
- Visitors: 1,330,024 (in 2024)
- Website: Official website

Riverside State Park is a Washington state park located 9 miles (14 km) northwest of Spokane in the community of Nine Mile Falls. The park protects 9,194 acres (3,721 ha) of Okanagan dry forest along the Spokane and Little Spokane rivers. It is the second largest state park in Washington after Mount Spokane State Park and is a popular recreation area for locals.

== Geography ==
As the name suggests, Riverside State Park is located along the banks of the Spokane River and Little Spokane River downstream of Spokane, Washington. The park stretches from the TJ Meenach Bridge in the West Hills neighborhood of Spokane downstream for approximately 12 river miles to north of the community of Nine Mile Falls. The Little Spokane River enters the Spokane River just downstream of Nine Mile Falls, from there, Riverside State Park extends westward up the Little Spokane River to Waikiki Road and the community of Fairwood. The park's ranger station is located at 9711 W. Charles Road in Nine Mile Falls.

Most of the park is located on the left bank of the Spokane River, though it does include some stretches of the right bank including portions of the city of Spokane proper. Because of this, almost all of the park's western boundary abuts the built-up urban area of Spokane, whether directly or from across the river.

Terrain in park is varied, with steep valleys along the rivers and more flat plateaus above. The Spokane River falls from approximately 1,680 feet when it enters the park in the south to approximately 1,540 feet at the Long Lake Reservoir on the northern edge of the park. Surrounding plateaus rise to 2,200 feet in places less than one mile west of the river. Mountains flanking the northern edge of the Little Spokane River valley rise even higher, to above 3,100 feet. The Spokane River meanders in northwesterly direction through the park in a thin, steep valley with only a handful of flat expanses less than 100 feet above the river level. There are multiple areas of nearly or fully sheer cliff drops of 100 feet or more throughout the park as the terrain rises from the river. As a result of this topography, there are multiple areas of whitewater rapids along the Spokane River. On the other hand, the valley of the Little Spokane River tends to be wider with many wetlands and oxbow lakes characteristic of a meandering stream. The Little Spokane falls from 1,560 feet at Waikiki Road when it enters the park 1,540 feet at its confluence with the Spokane River, a drop of just 20 feet over a straight-line distance of more than four miles (though the many meanders make its course considerably longer than the straight-line distance).

One other notable watercourse passes through the park. Deep Creek cuts a very thin canyon through the western portion of the park before entering the Spokane River just upstream of Nine Mile Falls. The vertical drop in the canyon is over 600 feet in a horizontal span of less than 1,000 feet in some places, with many areas featuring vertical cliffs of exposed basalt hundreds of feet in height.

== History ==
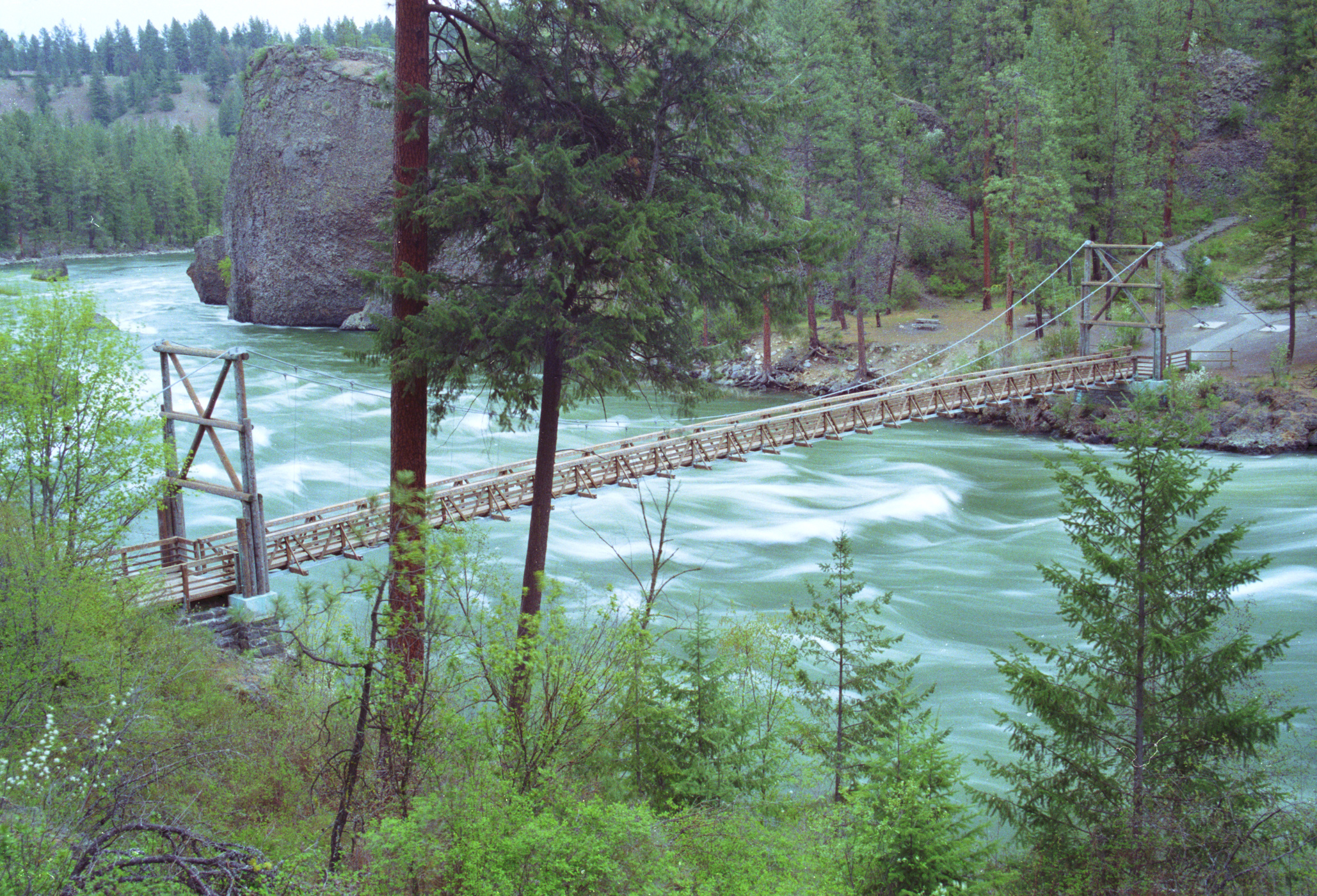
The suspension bridge in the park

The park came into being with various gifts of land in 1933 and 1934. It was developed by members of the Civilian Conservation Corps' 949th Company. The workers lived at Camp Seven Mile in what would become the park and worked to clear old logging debris, replant the forest and construct park structures. Evidence of the CCC's work can be seen at the Bowl and Pitcher area's suspension bridge, kitchen shelter, restroom, park residence, office, and maintenance shop. CCC workers also constructed the rock walls and much of the roadway of Aubrey White Parkway, the restroom on the Centennial Trail near the Carlson Trailhead, and various trails in the park. Camp Seven Mile was converted into a military base during World War II and the Korean War. Actor Clark Gable was among those who received training at Camp Seven Mile during World War II.

== Features ==
Areas of the park include the Bowl and Pitcher, the Nine Mile Recreation Area, the Little Spokane River Natural Area, the 600-acre (240 ha) off-road vehicle park, the equestrian trails area, and a portion of the 37-mile-long (60 km) Spokane River Centennial Trail. The Spokane House Interpretive Center has exhibits about the Spokane Indians, early pioneers, fur trappers, traders, the area's fort and military history, and Spokane House, the fur trading post established nearby. Numerous hiking and biking trails exist throughout the park.

== Activities and amenities ==
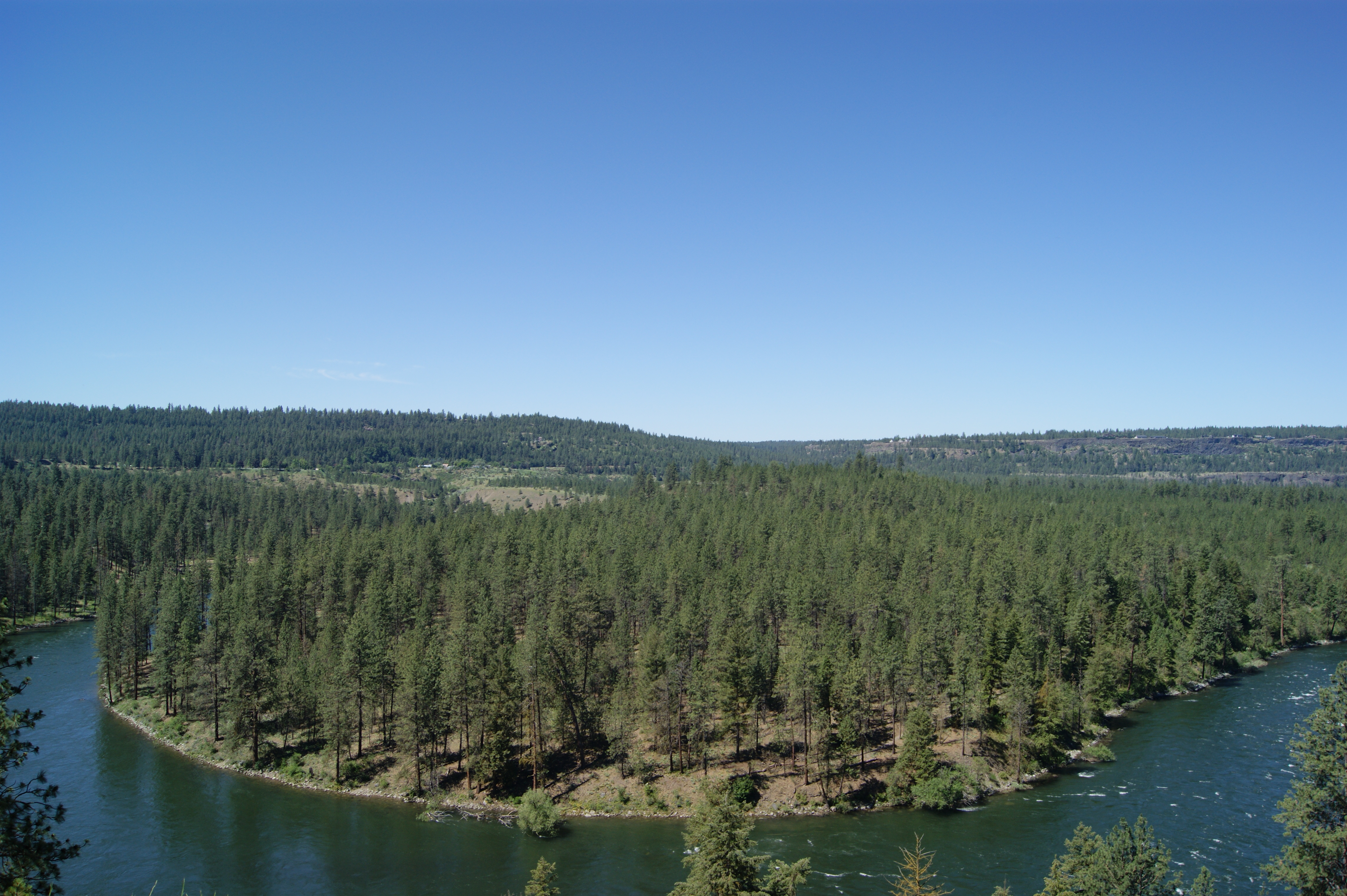
The equestrian area as seen from Spokane's Audubon/Downriver neighborhood

Park activities include camping, fishing, swimming, picnicking, boating, canoeing, kayaking, bird watching, wildlife viewing, ATV riding, horseback riding, biking, hiking and rock climbing. Campgrounds are located at the Bowl and Pitcher, the equestrian area, and Lake Spokane.
