= National Register of Historic Places listings in Walla Walla County, Washington =

Location of Walla Walla County in Washington

This list presents the full set of buildings, structures, objects, sites, or districts designated on the National Register of Historic Places in Walla Walla County, Washington, and offers brief descriptive information about each of them. The National Register recognizes places of national, state, or local historic significance across the United States. Out of over 90,000 National Register sites nationwide, Washington is home to approximately 1,500, and 34 of those are found partially or wholly in Walla Walla County.

This National Park Service list is complete through NPS recent listings posted August 21, 2026.

== Current listings ==
	Name on the Register	Image	Date listed	Location	City or town	Description
1	Bachtold Building-Interurban Depot	Bachtold Building-Interurban Depot	August 27, 2019 (#100004346)	330 W. Main St. 46°03′53″N 118°20′39″W	Walla Walla	
2	Max Baumeister Building	Max Baumeister Building	November 22, 2000 (#00001448)	27 W Main; 46°03′59″N 118°20′20″W	Walla Walla	Built in 1889 by real-estate and insurance agent Max Baumeister, the building is an example of Late Victorian commercial architecture with Italianate detailing. It has housed a variety of retail shops and professional offices over the years.
3	John F. Boyer House	John F. Boyer House	August 11, 1980 (#80004011)	204 Newell St. 46°03′45″N 118°22′08″W	Walla Walla	The 1883 Victorian Stick Style house was built by John Boyer, a pioneer banker who came from San Francisco. Currently under private ownership.
4	William Perry Bruce House	William Perry Bruce House	November 20, 1975 (#75001878)	318 Main St. 46°16′07″N 118°09′15″W	Waitsburg	Built in the Victorian Italianate style in 1883 by William Perry Bruce, a founding settler of Waitsburg. Now the Bruce Memorial Museum, run by the Waitsburg Historical Society.
5	Norman Francis Butler House	Norman Francis Butler House	November 12, 1992 (#92001586)	207 E Cherry St. 46°04′16″N 118°20′18″W	Walla Walla	A prime example of Late Victorian Queen Anne architecture, the house was built by Norman Francis Butler in 1882 for his wife. Currently a private residence.
6	Dacres Hotel	Dacres Hotel	November 5, 1974 (#74001984)	207 W Main St. 46°03′56″N 118°20′27″W	Walla Walla	Built in the Victorian Italianate style, in 1899 James E. Dacres opened a first-class hotel in Walla Walla, which operated until 1963. Currently houses the CrossRoads Steakhouse.
7	Dixie High School	Dixie High School	July 23, 1981 (#81000593)	10520 E Hwy. 12; 46°08′31″N 118°08′55″W	Dixie	Designed by the Walla Walla architectural firm of Osterman and Siebert and built in 1921, it remained a high school until 1941. Now houses Dixie Elementary School.
8	Electric Light Works Building	Electric Light Works Building	January 4, 2012 (#11001013)	111 N 6th Ave. 46°03′56″N 118°20′43″W	Walla Walla	Designed by Henry Osterman, the plant was originally built in 1890 to produce coal gas. It was later converted to generate electricity. Now home to the Power House Theater.
9	Fort Walla Walla Historic District	Fort Walla Walla Historic District	April 16, 1974 (#74001985)	77 Wainwright Dr. 46°03′09″N 118°21′31″W	Walla Walla	Fort Walla Walla was built on its present site in 1859, and housed troops until its closure in 1910. Fifteen buildings built between 1858 and 1906 remain standing on the property. Today the site contains a 208-acre city park, the Fort Walla Walla Museum, and the Jonathan M. Wainwright Memorial VA Medical Center.
10	Green Park School	Green Park School	November 8, 1990 (#90001604)	1105 Isaacs Ave. 46°04′28″N 118°19′20″W	Walla Walla	Designed by Henry Osterman and built in 1905, the school is an example of Renaissance Revival architecture. It remains Green Park Elementary School today.
11	Johnson Bridge	Johnson Bridge	July 16, 1982 (#82004302)	Touchet North Rd (spans Touchet River); 46°07′22″N 118°38′57″W	Lowden	Designed by E.R. Smith and built by the Walla Walla County engineering department in 1929, the bridge spans the Touchet River. Replaced by a new bridge in 2007.
12	Kirkman House	Kirkman House	December 27, 1974 (#74001986)	214 N Colville St. 46°04′13″N 118°20′23″W	Walla Walla	The oldest residence in Walla Walla, the brick Italianate Victorian style house was built by William Kirkman in 1880, and was home to three generations of his descendants. Today it serves as the Kirkman House Museum and Textile Center.
13	Liberty Theater	Liberty Theater	April 29, 1993 (#93000358)	50 E Main St. 46°04′03″N 118°20′15″W	Walla Walla	An example of Craftsman and Moderne architecture, the building was designed by Osterman and Siebert, originally opening in 1917 as the American Theater. Now a Macy's department store.
14	Lower Snake River Archaeological District	Lower Snake River Archaeological District	October 29, 1984 (#84000471)	Address restricted	Burbank	
15	George Ludwigs House	George Ludwigs House	April 12, 1982 (#82004303)	125 Newell St. 46°03′50″N 118°19′55″W	Walla Walla	Local businessman George Ludwigs commissioned William Meyer in 1904 to design the house for the Luwigs family. The house, an example of Craftsman and Shingle Style architecture, is currently a private residence.
16	Marcus Whitman Hotel	Marcus Whitman Hotel	November 30, 1999 (#99001461)	107 N. Second Ave. 46°04′10″N 118°20′24″W	Walla Walla	
17	Memorial Building, Whitman College	Memorial Building, Whitman College	December 3, 1974 (#74001987)	345 Boyer Ave. 46°04′16″N 118°19′42″W	Walla Walla	
18	Miles C. Moore House	Miles C. Moore House	November 13, 1989 (#89001949)	720 Bryant; 46°03′22″N 118°19′04″W	Walla Walla	Originally built in 1883, the home of Territorial Governor Miles Moore and his family.
19	Northern Pacific Railway Passenger Depot	Northern Pacific Railway Passenger Depot	December 6, 1990 (#90001862)	416 N. Second Ave. 46°04′15″N 118°20′30″W	Walla Walla	
20	Osterman House	Osterman House	October 19, 1983 (#83004274)	508 Lincoln St. 46°03′57″N 118°19′31″W	Walla Walla	
21	Preston Hall	Preston Hall	January 12, 1993 (#92001590)	600 Main St. 46°15′59″N 118°09′12″W	Waitsburg	
22	Saturno-Breen Truck Garden	Saturno-Breen Truck Garden	March 1, 1982 (#82004301)	East of College Place on Rt. 5; 46°03′04″N 118°22′42″W	College Place	
23	Small-Elliott House	Small-Elliott House	March 1, 1982 (#82004304)	314 E. Poplar St. 46°04′03″N 118°19′50″W	Walla Walla	
24	U.S. Post Office – Walla Walla Main	U.S. Post Office – Walla Walla Main	May 30, 1991 (#91000660)	128 N. Second St. 46°04′06″N 118°20′20″W	Walla Walla	
25	Waitsburg High School	Waitsburg High School	April 25, 2001 (#01000431)	421 Coopei St. 46°16′01″N 118°09′05″W	Waitsburg	
26	Waitsburg Historic District	Waitsburg Historic District	March 31, 1978 (#78002784)	Main St. 46°16′19″N 118°09′11″W	Waitsburg	
27	Walla Walla Downtown Historic District	Walla Walla Downtown Historic District	September 3, 2021 (#100006868)	Roughly bounded by Rose St., Palouse St., alley between Alder and Popular Sts., and 3rd Ave. 46°04′02″N 118°20′17″W	Walla Walla	
28	Walla Walla Public Library	Walla Walla Public Library	November 20, 1974 (#74001988)	109 S. Palouse St. 46°04′03″N 118°19′57″W	Walla Walla	Designed by Henry Osterman. Now the Carnegie Art Center.
29	Walla Walla Valley Traction Company Car Barn	Walla Walla Valley Traction Company Car Barn	December 7, 1989 (#89002097)	1102 W. Cherry; 46°04′04″N 118°21′24″W	Walla Walla	Originally Walla Walla's streetcar and train facility. Now the Canoe Ridge Vineyard tasting room.
30	Washington School	Washington School	November 21, 1991 (#91001737)	501 N. Cayuse; 46°04′06″N 118°21′02″W	Walla Walla	
31	Whitehouse-Crawford Planing Mill	Whitehouse-Crawford Planing Mill	March 3, 2000 (#00000189)	212 N. 3rd Ave. 46°04′07″N 118°21′00″W	Walla Walla	Built in 1904 as a woodworking mill. Now the Seven Hills Winery.
32	Whitman Mission National Historic Site	Whitman Mission National Historic Site	October 15, 1966 (#66000749)	6 mi (9.7 km). West of Walla Walla off U.S. 410; 46°02′24″N 118°27′41″W	Walla Walla	
33	Windust Caves Archaeological District	Windust Caves Archaeological District	October 29, 1984 (#84000479)	Address restricted	Windust	
34	YMCA Building – Walla Walla	YMCA Building – Walla Walla	February 2, 2015 (#14001245)	28 S. Spokane Street; 46°04′05″N 118°20′08″W	Walla Walla	

== Former listing ==
	Name on the Register	Image	Date listed	Date removed	Location	City or town	Description
1	Adolph Schwarz Building		January 1, 1976 (#76002273)	December 13, 1976	27-33 E. Main St.	Walla Walla	Demolished in 1976

== See also ==
- National Register of Historic Places listings in Washington state
- Listings in neighboring counties: Benton, Columbia, Franklin, Umatilla
- Historic preservation
- History of Washington (state)
- Index of Washington (state)-related articles
