= National Register of Historic Places listings in Franklin County, Washington =

Location of Franklin County in Washington

This list presents the full set of buildings, structures, objects, sites, or districts designated on the National Register of Historic Places in Franklin County, Washington, and offers brief descriptive information about each of them. The National Register recognizes places of national, state, or local historic significance across the United States. Out of over 90,000 National Register sites nationwide, Washington is home to approximately 1,500, and 16 of those are found partially or wholly in Franklin County.

This National Park Service list is complete through NPS recent listings posted April 18, 2025.

== Current listings ==
	Name on the Register	Image	Date listed	Location	City or town	Description
1	Allen Rockshelter		November 16, 1978 (#78002741)	Address Restricted	Pasco	
2	Burr Cave		December 15, 1978 (#78002742)	Address Restricted	Walker	
3	Franklin County Courthouse	Franklin County Courthouse	February 8, 1978 (#78002740)	1016 N. 4th Ave.. 46°14′14″N 119°05′44″W	Pasco	
4	Kurtzman Park	Kurtzman Park	December 27, 2022 (#100008491)	331 S. Wehe Ave. 46°13′55″N 119°04′29″W	Pasco	
5	Lower Snake River Archaeological District	Lower Snake River Archaeological District	October 29, 1984 (#84000471)	Address Restricted	Pasco	
6	Marmes Rockshelter	Marmes Rockshelter	October 15, 1966 (#66000745)	Under Lake Herbert G. West; 46°36′52″N 118°12′09″W	Lyons Ferry	
7	James Moore House	James Moore House	May 31, 1979 (#79002532)	Off U.S. 395; 46°13′43″N 119°08′04″W	Pasco	
8	Morning Star Baptist Church	Morning Star Baptist Church	September 29, 2022 (#100008226)	631 South Douglas Ave. 46°13′42″N 119°04′20″W	Pasco	
9	Palouse Canyon Archaeological District	Palouse Canyon Archaeological District	October 29, 1984 (#84000464)	Address Restricted	Starbuck	
10	Pasco Carnegie Library	Pasco Carnegie Library	August 3, 1982 (#82004212)	305 N. 4th Ave. 46°13′58″N 119°05′35″W	Pasco	Carnegie Libraries of Washington TR
11	Sacajawea State Park	Sacajawea State Park	April 24, 2007 (#07000364)	2503 Sacajawea Park Rd; 46°12′00″N 119°02′26″W	Pasco	
12	Savage Island Archeological District	Savage Island Archeological District	August 28, 1976 (#76001881)	Address Restricted	Richland	
13	Spokane, Portland and Seattle Railway Company-Box Canyon Viaduct	Spokane, Portland and Seattle Railway Company-Box Canyon Viaduct	December 31, 2018 (#100003280)	Milepost 270.0, former SP&S RR line 46°32′57″N 118°33′29″W	Windust vicinity	
14	Strawberry Island Village Archeological Site	Strawberry Island Village Archeological Site	August 21, 1980 (#80003999)	Address Restricted	Pasco	
15	Tri-Cities Archaeological District	Tri-Cities Archaeological District	October 29, 1984 (#84000468)	Address Restricted	Richland	
16	Windust Caves Archaeological District	Windust Caves Archaeological District	October 29, 1984 (#84000479)	Address Restricted	Windust	

== Former listings ==
	Name on the Register	Image	Date listed	Date removed	Location	City or town	Description
1	Pasco-Kennewick Bridge	Pasco-Kennewick Bridge	March 26, 1979 (#82004213)	July 16, 1990	Spanned the Columbia River downstream of the Ed Hendler Bridge	Pasco	Demolished in 1990

== See also ==
- National Register of Historic Places listings in Washington state
- Listings in neighboring counties: Adams, Benton, Columbia, Grant, Benton, Walla Walla, Whitman
- List of National Historic Landmarks in Washington (state)
- Historic preservation
- History of Washington (state)
- Index of Washington (state)-related articles
