= National Register of Historic Places listings in Washington state =

Counties in the U.S. state of Washington

This is a list of properties and historic districts in Washington that are listed on the National Register of Historic Places. There are at least three listings in each of Washington's 39 counties.

The National Register of Historic Places recognizes buildings, structures, objects, sites, and districts of national, state, or local historic significance across the United States. Out of over 90,000 National Register sites nationwide, more than 1,500 are in Washington.

This National Park Service list is complete through NPS recent listings posted November 6, 2026.

== Current listings by county ==
The following are tallies of current listings by county. (Note: These counts are based on entries in the National Register Information Database as of April 24, 2008 and new weekly listings posted since then on the National Register of Historic Places web site. There are frequent additions to the listings and occasional delistings and the counts here are approximate and not official. New entries are added to the official Register on a weekly basis. Also, the counts in this table exclude boundary increase and decrease listings which only modify the area covered by an existing property or district, although carrying a separate National Register reference number.)

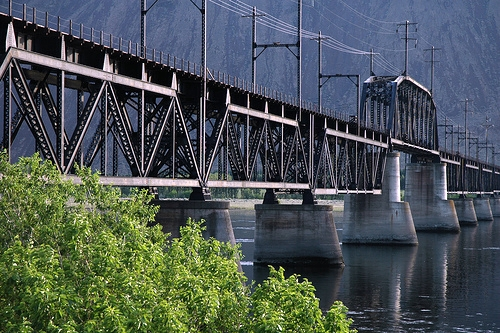
Beverly Railroad Bridge, in Kittitas County

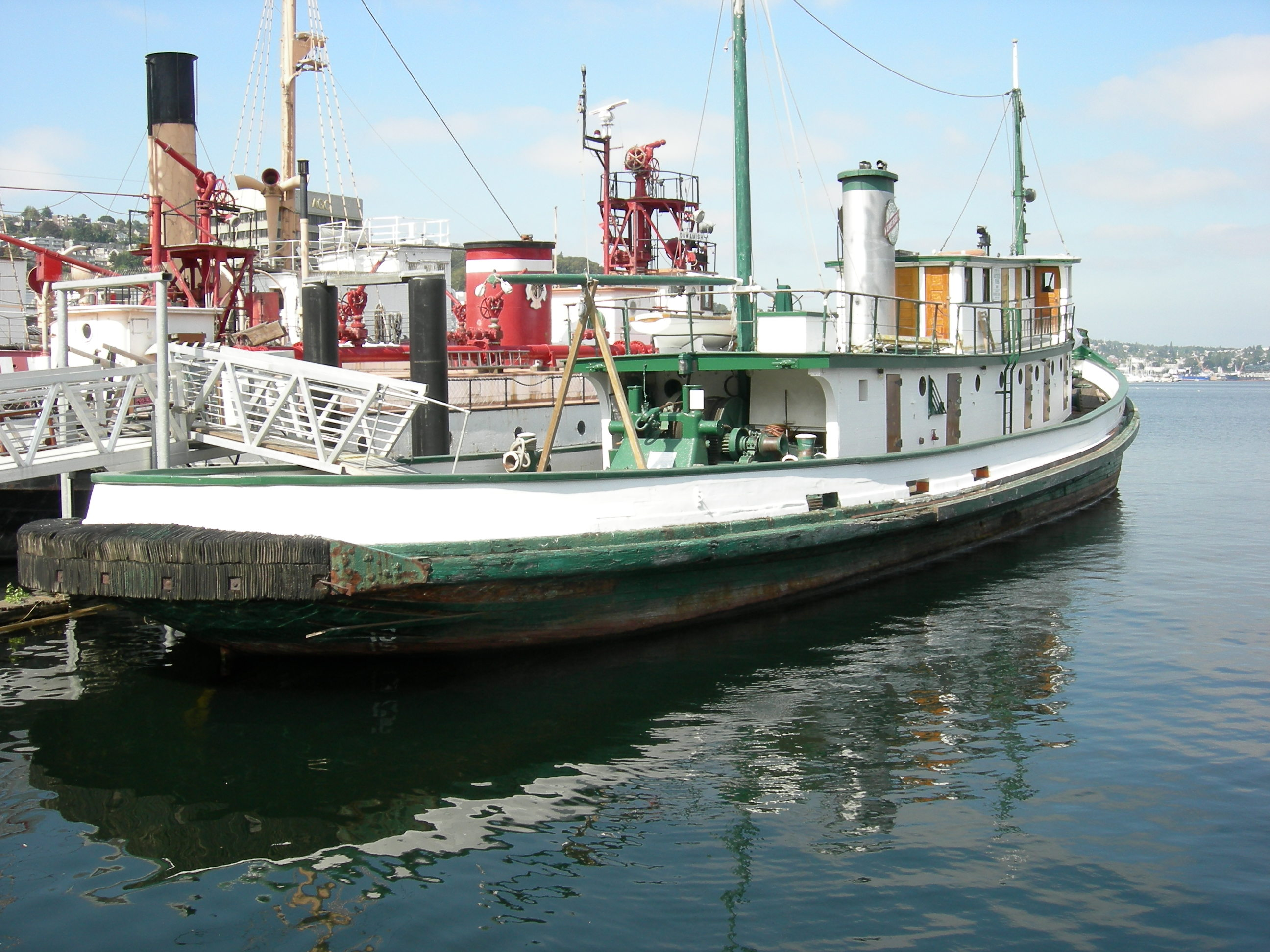
Arthur Foss, in King County

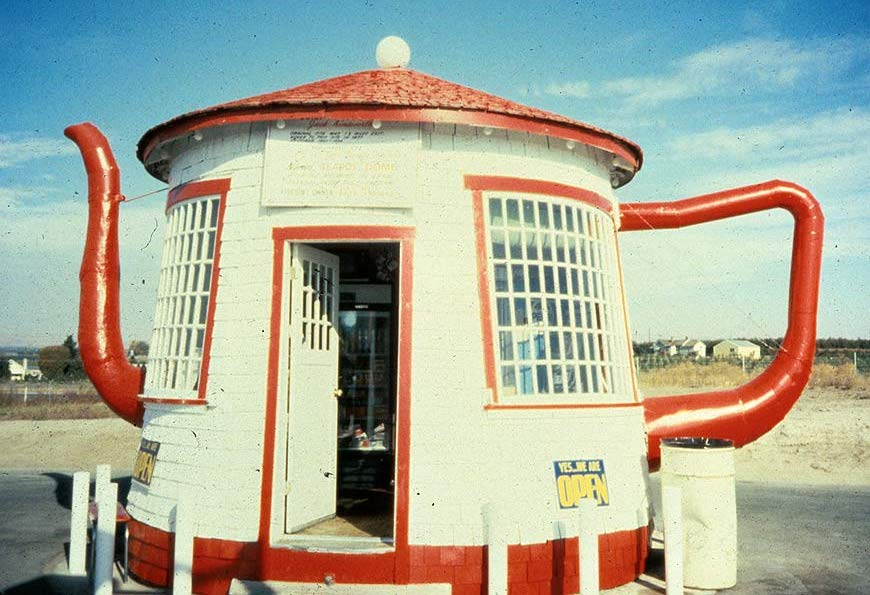
Teapot Dome Service Station, in Yakima County

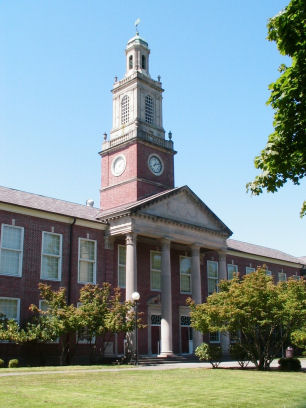
R. A. Long High School, in Cowlitz County

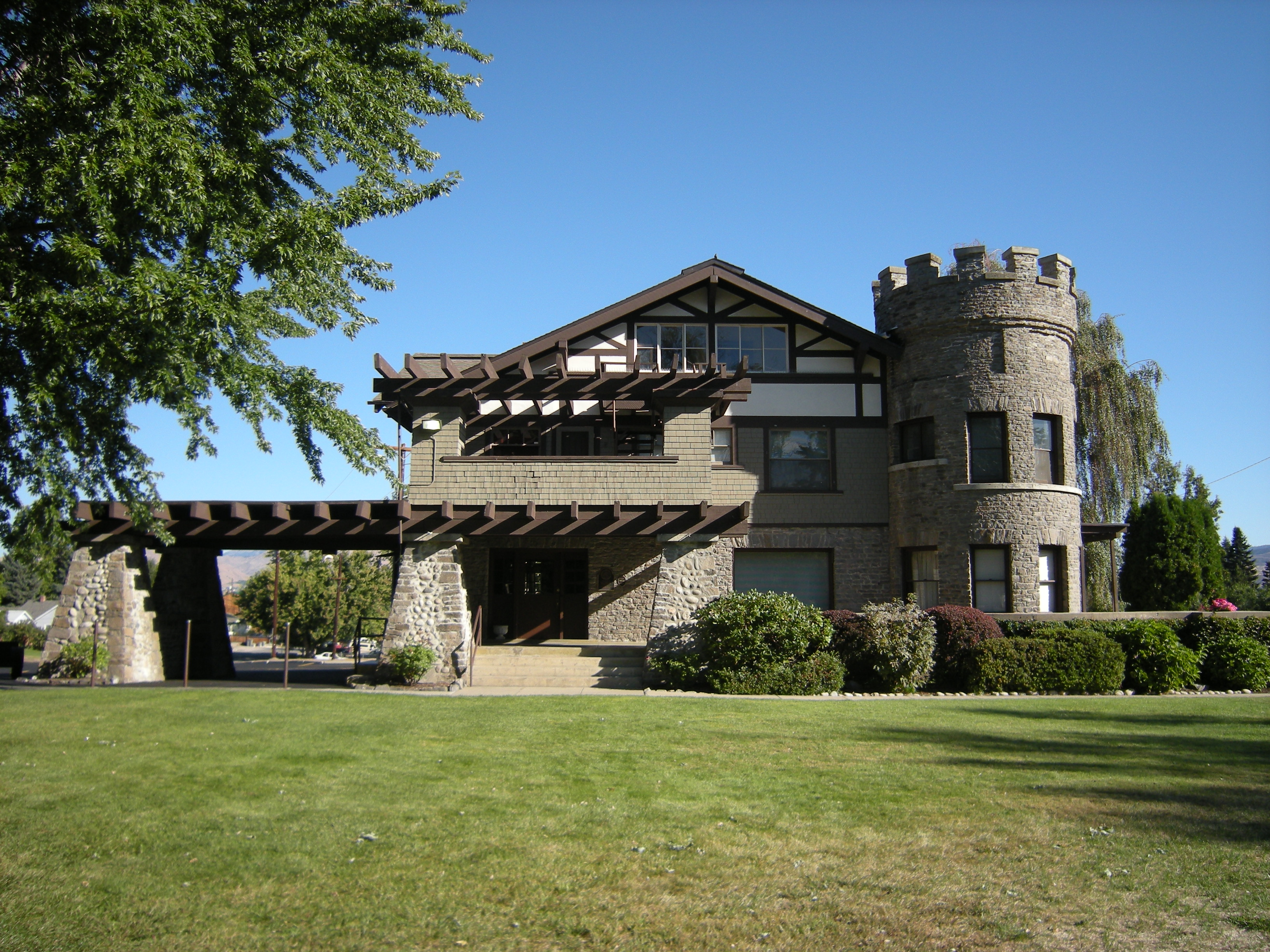
The Wells House, in Chelan County

	County	# of Listings
1	Adams	12
2	Asotin	8
3	Benton	17
4	Chelan	48
5	Clallam	49
6	Clark	45
7	Columbia	20
8	Cowlitz	32
9	Douglas	53
10	Ferry	13
11	Franklin	16
12	Garfield	3
13	Grant	11
14	Grays Harbor	22
15	Island	16
16	Jefferson	80
17.1	King: Seattle	226
17.2	King: Other	93
17.3	King County: Total	319
18	Kitsap	22
19	Kittitas	25
20	Klickitat	12
21	Lewis	42
22	Lincoln	11
23	Mason	18
24	Okanogan	17
25	Pacific	20
26	Pend Oreille	9
27	Pierce	194
28	San Juan	19
29	Skagit	32
30	Skamania	6
31	Snohomish	50
32	Spokane	160
33	Stevens	25
34	Thurston	68
35	Wahkiakum	6
36	Walla Walla	34
37	Whatcom	74
38	Whitman	37
39	Yakima	71
(duplicates):		(21) (Note: Several historic resources in Washington are included on multiple county lists: Barstow Bridge: Ferry and Stevens; Beverly Railroad Bridge: Grant and Kittitas; Columbia River Bridge at Bridgeport: Chelan and Douglas; Columbia River Bridge at Kettle Falls: Ferry and Stevens; Deception Pass: Island and Skagit; Kettle Falls District: Ferry and Stevens; Lawetlat'la: Cowlitz and Skamania; Little Falls Hydroelectric Power Plant: Lincoln and Stevens; Long Lake Hydroelectric Power Plant: Lincoln and Stevens; Longmire Buildings: Lewis and Pierce; Longmire Historic District: Lewis and Pierce; Lower Snake River Archaeological District: Franklin and Walla Walla; Mount Rainier National Park: Lewis and Pierce; Orient Bridge: Ferry and Stevens; Rock Island Railroad Bridge: Chelan and Douglas; Senator George Sellar Bridge: Chelan and Douglas; Spokane River Bridge at Long Lake Dam: Lincoln and Stevens; Stevens Pass Historic District: Chelan and King; Tri-Cities Archaeological District: Benton and Franklin; Windust Caves Archaeological District: Franklin and Walla Walla; Yale Bridge: Clark and Cowlitz)
Total:		1,695

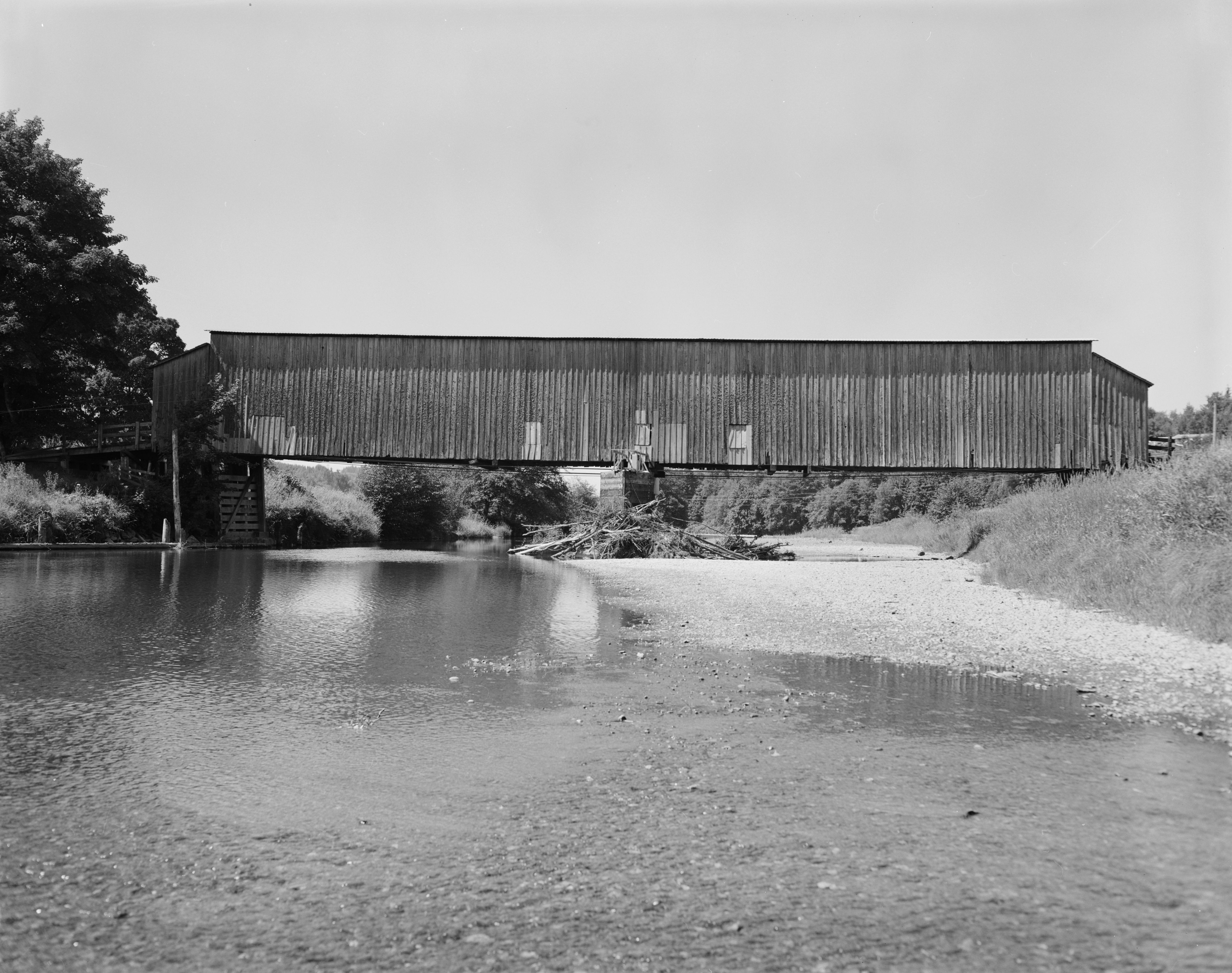
Grays River Covered Bridge, in Wahkiakum County

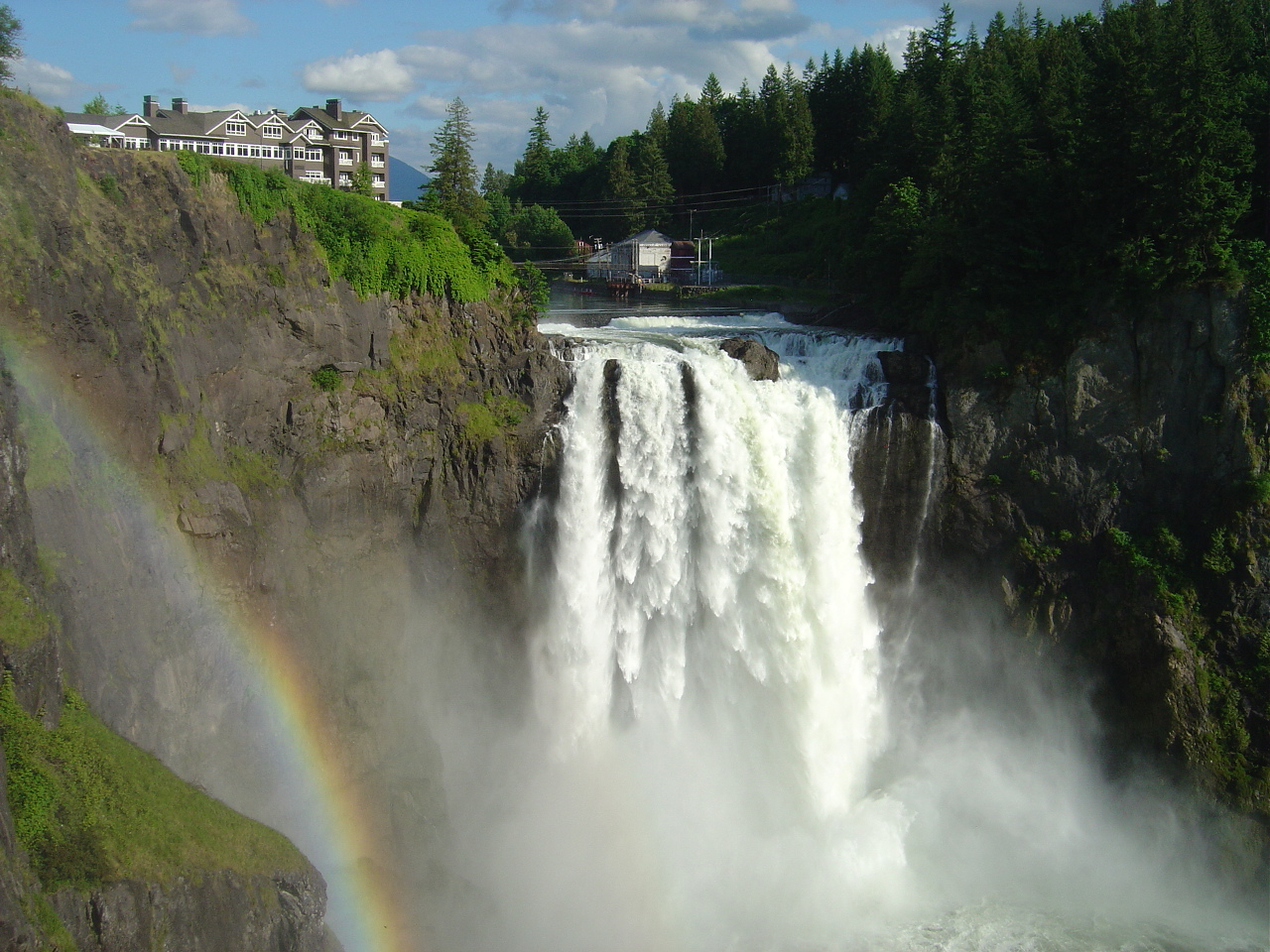
Snoqualmie Falls, in King County

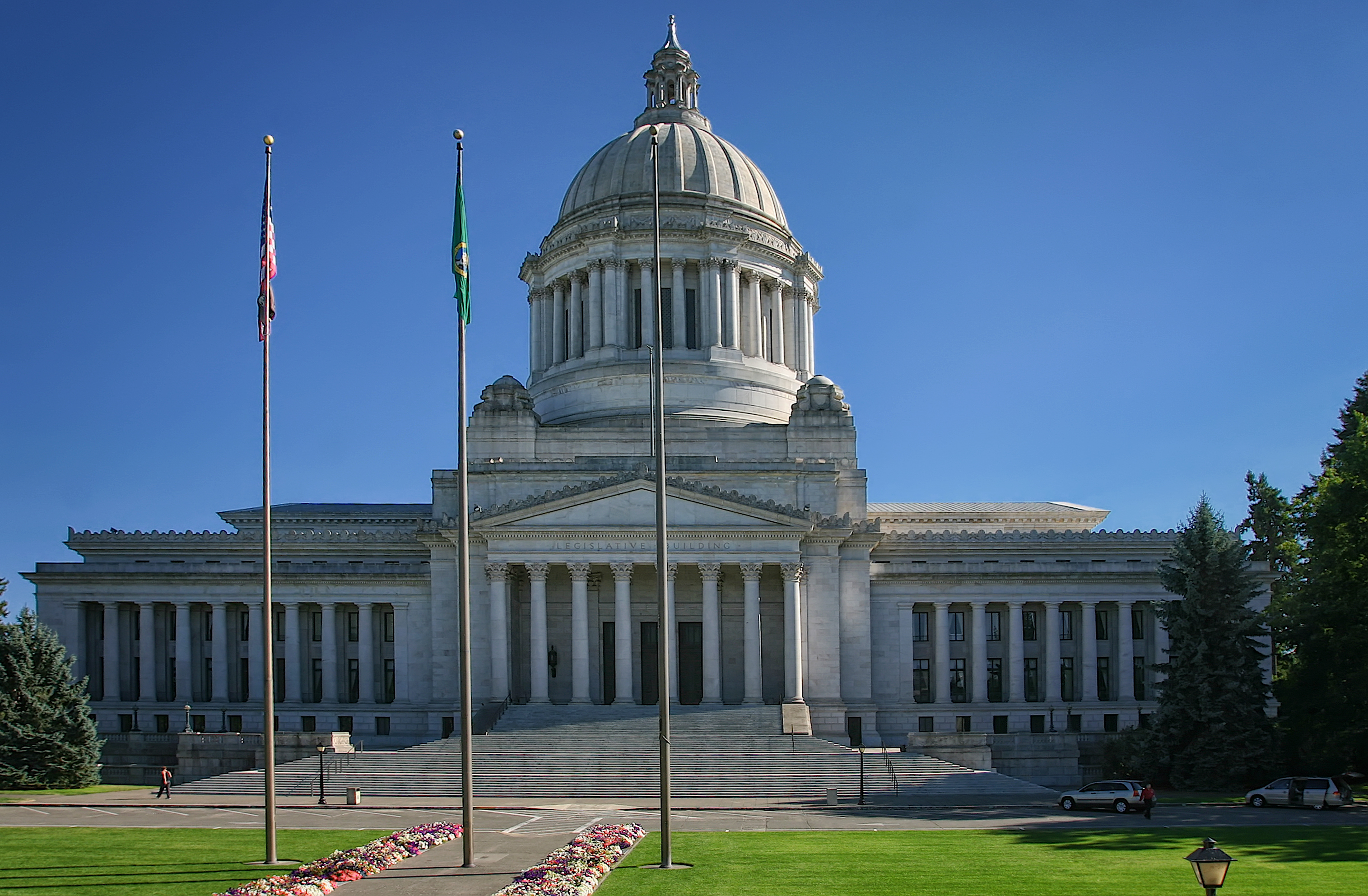
Washington State Capitol Historic District in Thurston County

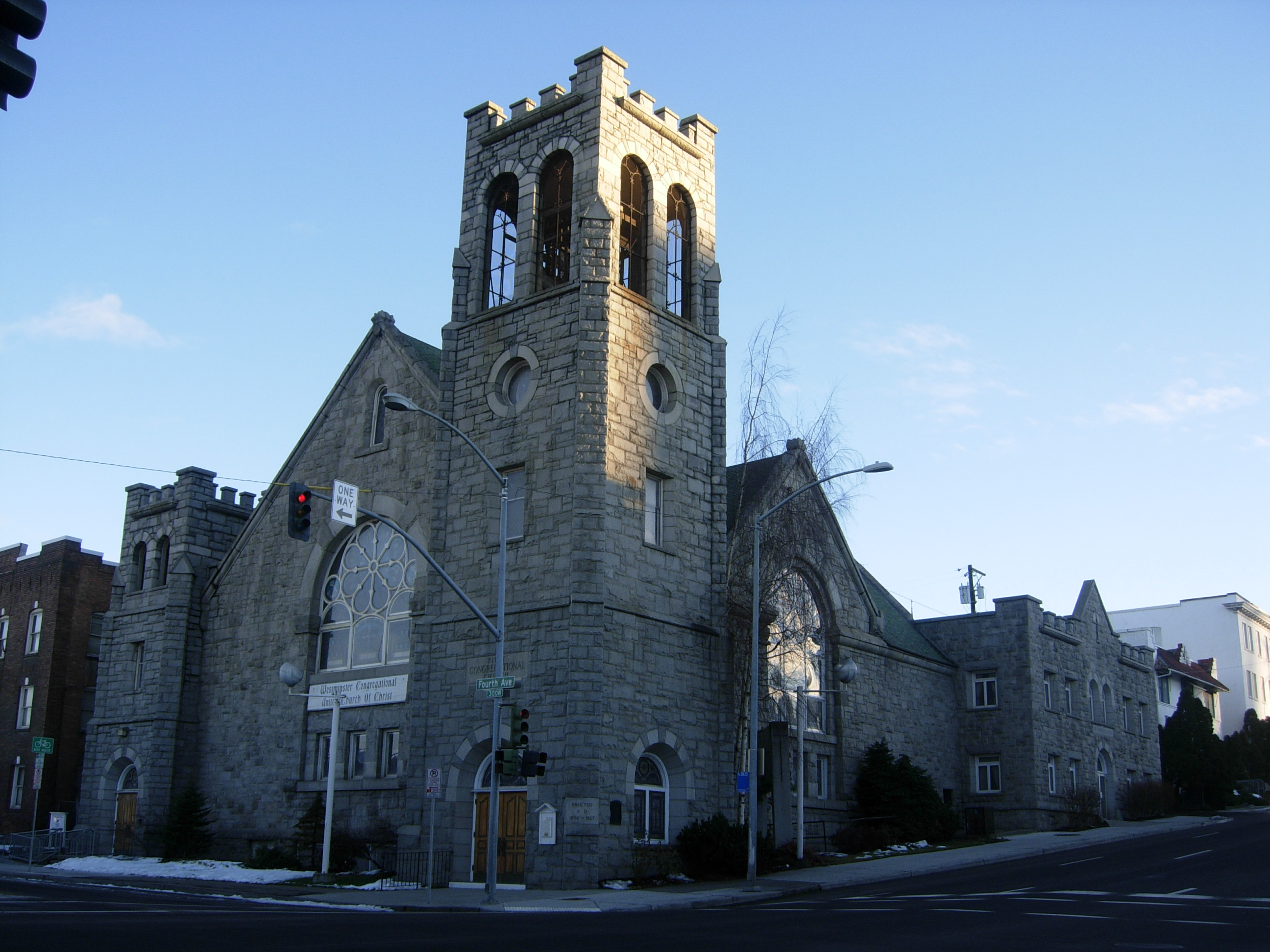
First Congregational Church, in Spokane County

== See also ==
- Historic preservation
- History of Washington (state)
- National Register of Historic Places
- List of National Historic Landmarks in Washington (state)
- List of bridges on the National Register of Historic Places in Washington (state)
- List of historical societies in Washington (state)
- Index of Washington (state)-related articles
