= National Register of Historic Places listings in Benton County, Washington =

Location of Benton County in Washington

This list presents the full set of buildings, structures, objects, sites, or districts designated on the National Register of Historic Places in Benton County, Washington, and offers brief descriptive information about each of them. The National Register recognizes places of national, state, or local historic significance across the United States. Out of over 90,000 National Register sites nationwide, Washington is home to approximately 1,500, and 17 of those are found partially or wholly in Benton County.

This National Park Service list is complete through NPS recent listings posted November 21, 2025.

== Current listings ==
	Name on the Register	Image	Date listed	Location	City or town	Description
1	Benton County Courthouse	Benton County Courthouse	December 12, 1976 (#76001869)	620 Market Street; 46°12′13″N 119°46′14″W	Prosser	
2	J. W. Carey House	J. W. Carey House	December 7, 1989 (#89002096)	105 West Byron Road, about 1.2 miles (1.9 km) west of Prosser; 46°11′52″N 119°47′30″W	Prosser	
3	Glade Creek Site		October 21, 1977 (#77001330)	Address restricted	Prosser	
4	Gold Coast Historic District	Gold Coast Historic District	March 7, 2005 (#04000315)	Roughly bounded by Willis Street to the north, Davison Avenue and Hunt Avenue to the east, Davison Avenue to the south, and George Washington Way to the west 46°17′52″N 119°16′17″W	Richland	
5	Hanford B Reactor	Hanford B Reactor	April 3, 1992 (#92000245)	About 5.3 miles (8.5 km) northeast of junction of State Route 24 and State Route 240 on the Hanford Site; 46°37′49″N 119°38′51″W	Richland	Designated a National Historic Landmark August 19, 2008
6	Hanford Island Archeological Site	Hanford Island Archeological Site	August 28, 1976 (#76001870)	Address restricted	Richland	
7	Hanford North Archeological District	Hanford North Archeological District	August 28, 1976 (#76001871)	Address restricted	Richland	
8	Kennewick Fruit & Produce Company Building	Kennewick Fruit & Produce Company Building	July 7, 2025 (#100011980)	215 West Canal Drive; 46°12′36″N 119°07′15″W	Kennewick	
9	Locke Island Archeological District	Locke Island Archeological District	August 28, 1976 (#76001872)	Address restricted	Richland	
10	Post Office and Federal Office Building	Post Office and Federal Office Building	September 30, 2024 (#100010893)	825 Jadwin Avenue; 46°16′39″N 119°16′31″W	Richland	
11	Rattlesnake Springs Sites		May 4, 1976 (#76001873)	Address restricted	Richland	
12	Ryegrass Archeological District		January 31, 1976 (#76001874)	Address restricted	Richland	
13	Snively Canyon Archeological District		August 28, 1976 (#76001875)	Address restricted	Richland	
14	Telegraph Island Petroglyphs	Telegraph Island Petroglyphs	March 10, 1975 (#75001840)	Address restricted	Paterson	
15	Tri-Cities Archaeological District	Tri-Cities Archaeological District	October 29, 1984 (#84000468)	Address restricted	Kennewick	
16	U.S. Post Office – Prosser Main	U.S. Post Office – Prosser Main	August 7, 1991 (#91000653)	1103 Meade Avenue; 46°12′15″N 119°46′14″W	Prosser	
17	Wooded Island Archeological District		July 19, 1976 (#76001876)	Address restricted	Richland	

== Former listings ==
	Name on the Register	Image	Date listed	Date removed	Location	City or town	Description
1	Prosser Steel Bridge		July 16, 1982 (#82004195)	July 16, 1990	Across Yakima River, on Grant Avenue; 46°12′49″N 119°46′09″W	Prosser	Replaced with a modern bridge in 1986.

== See also ==
- National Register of Historic Places listings in Washington state
- Listings in neighboring counties: Franklin, Grant, Klickitat, Morrow, Umatilla, Walla Walla, Yakima
- List of National Historic Landmarks in Washington (state)
- Historic preservation
- History of Washington (state)
- Index of Washington (state)-related articles
