= National Register of Historic Places listings in Grant County, Washington =

Location of Grant County in Washington

This list presents the full set of buildings, structures, objects, sites, or districts designated on the National Register of Historic Places in Grant County, Washington, and offers brief descriptive information about each of them. The National Register recognizes places of national, state, or local historic significance across the United States. Out of over 90,000 National Register sites nationwide, Washington is home to approximately 1,500, and 11 of those are found partially or wholly in Grant County.

This National Park Service list is complete through NPS recent listings posted June 26, 2026.

== Current listings ==
	Name on the Register	Image	Date listed	Location	City or town	Description
1	Bell Hotel	Bell Hotel	September 15, 1997 (#97001082)	210 W. Division St. 47°19′14″N 119°33′04″W	Ephrata	
2	Beverly Railroad Bridge	Beverly Railroad Bridge	July 16, 1982 (#82004214)	Spans Columbia River; 46°49′52″N 119°56′54″W	Beverly	
3	Columbia Basin Project Irrigation Division Headquarters Office	Columbia Basin Project Irrigation Division Headquarters Office	June 21, 2019 (#100004099)	32 C St. NW; 47°19′17″N 119°33′10″W	Ephrata	
4	Grant County Courthouse	Grant County Courthouse	September 5, 1975 (#75001850)	C St., NW; 47°19′19″N 119°33′08″W	Ephrata	
5	Hartline School	Hartline School	January 7, 2010 (#09001217)	92 Chelan Street; 47°41′12″N 119°06′30″W	Hartline	
6	Lind Coulee Archaeological Site	Lind Coulee Archaeological Site	January 21, 1974 (#74001953)	Address Restricted	Warden	
7	Mesa 36	Mesa 36	December 8, 1978 (#78002744)	Address Restricted	Soap Lake	
8	Paris Archeological Site		September 20, 1978 (#78002743)	Address Restricted	Richland	
9	Samuel and Katherine Reiman House	Samuel and Katherine Reiman House	December 17, 2008 (#08001201)	415 F. St. SW. 47°14′01″N 119°51′40″W	Quincy	Now used as a museum
10	Stratford School	Stratford School	October 25, 1990 (#90001606)	Just off WA 7; 47°25′35″N 119°16′59″W	Stratford	Rural Public Schools of Washington State MPS
11	Wilson Creek State Bank	Wilson Creek State Bank	September 25, 1975 (#75001851)	Off WA 7; 47°25′19″N 119°07′24″W	Wilson Creek	Built in 1906. Currently houses local history museum.

== See also ==
- National Register of Historic Places listings in Washington state
- Listings in neighboring counties: Adams, Benton, Douglas, Franklin, Kittitas, Lincoln, Okanogan, Yakima
- Historic preservation
- History of Washington (state)
- Index of Washington (state)-related articles
