= Kirkman House =

Kirkman House may refer to:

in Canada

- Kirkman House, Arnprior, a historic house, now a bed and breakfast

in the United States

- Kirkman House (Walla Walla, Washington), a house museum
- O. Arthur Kirkman House and Outbuildings, High Point, North Carolina, National Register of Historic Places listings in Guilford County, North Carolina
- Kirkman Ale House, Orlando, Florida
- Kirkman House (Kirkman, Iowa), the first house in the town of Kirkman, Iowa
