= Creaser Hotel =

Historic house in Washington, United States

- U.S. National Register of Historic Places
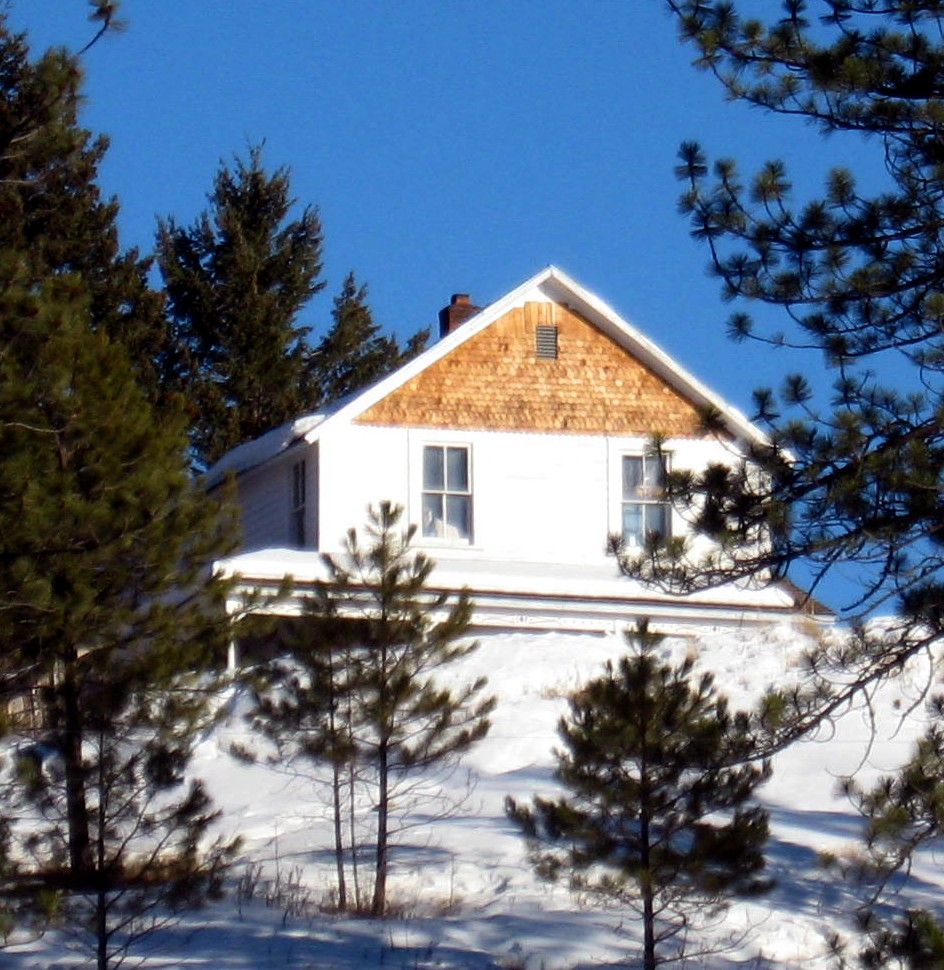
- The Creaser Hotel seen from Clark Ave in winter

- Location within Washington (state)
- Location: 664 Church Ln., Republic, Washington
- Coordinates: 48°38′50.80″N 118°44′07.68″W
- Area: less than one acre
- Built: 1897
- NRHP reference No.: 82004211
- Added to NRHP: April 12, 1982

The Creaser Hotel, also known as the Jane Cody Residence , is a hotel and residence in Republic, Washington and listed on the National Register of Historic Places. The hotel was built in 1897 by Phil Creaser, who located the Republic and Jim Blaine mines. Located on the crest of Creaser Hill, this building is the oldest frame structure still in existence in Republic, and surpassed in age only by the Kaufman Cabin, built one year earlier in 1896. The building has shiplap siding and a hip roof porch with pierced barge boards and bracketed posts on two sides. When first constructed water was provided by a water tower and gravity feed water system, both of which have now been removed. The building was operated as a hotel until sometime in 1905–1909 by Phil Creaser, at which time it was sold to the George Moody Family. It has since served as a private residence.

== See also ==
- List of Registered Historic Places in Washington
