= South Side Historic District =

South Side Historic District may refer to:

- South Side Historic District (Kansas City, Missouri), listed on the National Register of Historic Places in Jackson County, Missouri
- South Side Historic District (Palestine, Texas), listed on the National Register of Historic Places in Anderson County, Texas
- South Side Historic District (Dayton, Washington), listed on the National Register of Historic Places in Columbia County, Washington
