= Fairweather–Trevitt House =

Historic house in Washington, United States

- U.S. National Register of Historic Places
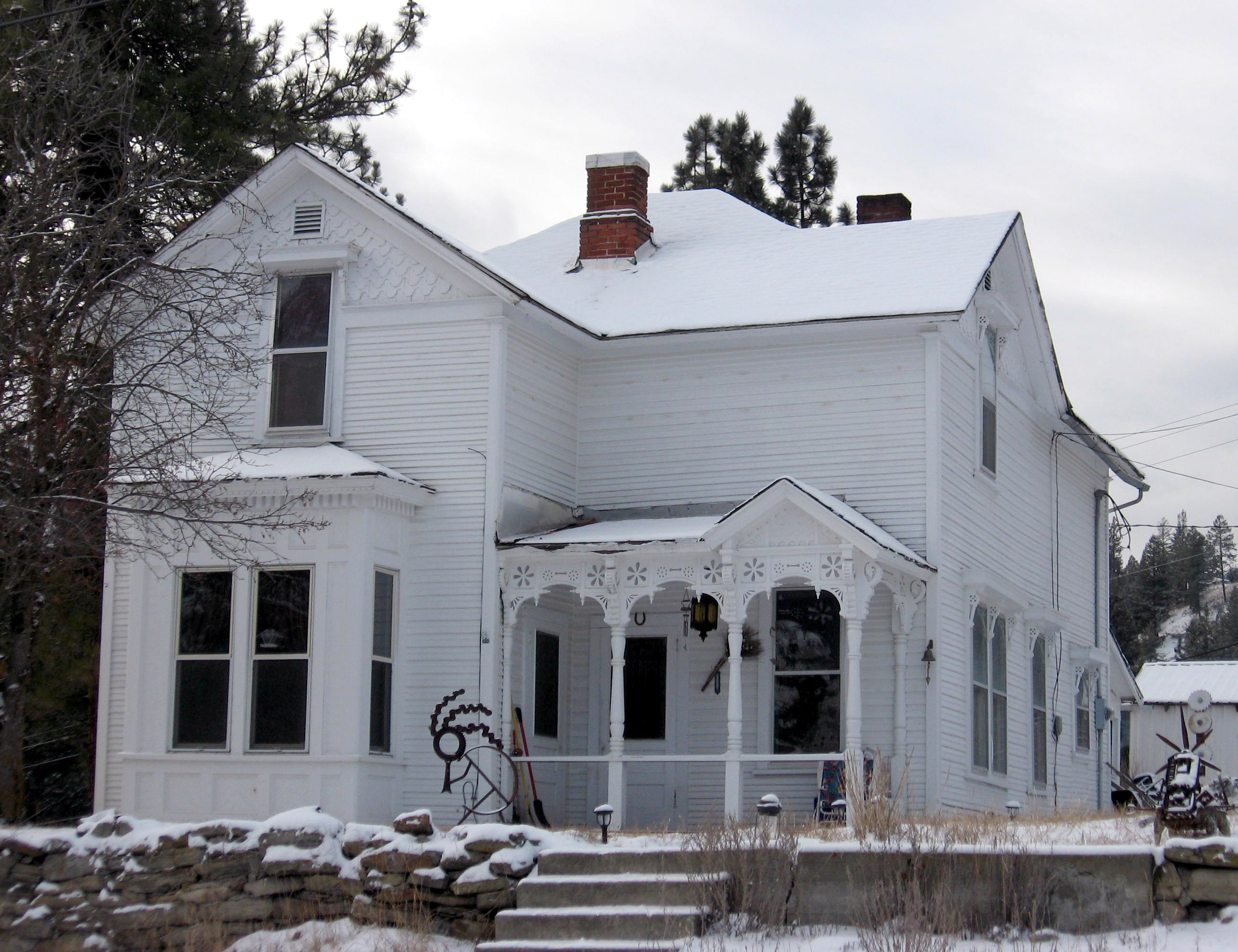
- The Fairweather–Trevitt House in 2007
- Location: Republic, Washington
- Coordinates: 48°38′49.46″N 118°44′26.46″W
- Area: less than one acre
- Built: 1902
- Architectural style: Late Victorian
- NRHP reference No.: 00000975
- Added to NRHP: August 10, 2000

The Fairweather–Trevitt House is a Late Victorian 2-story house located in Republic, Washington. It was built in 1902 for George W. Fairweather, an early figure in the mines of the Republic Mining District. Little has changed on the exterior of the house since its construction. Over the years a new concrete foundation and a roofed back porch were added.

== See also ==
List of Registered Historic Places in Washington
