= Henry Osterman =

American architect

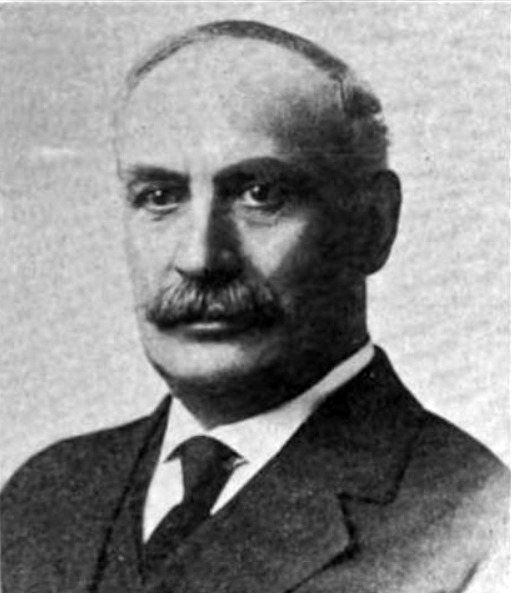
Osterman in 1916 for Up-To-The-TImes Magazine

Osterman and Siebert (1862–?) was an American architectural firm in Walla Walla, Washington, comprising senior partner Henry Osterman and Victor E. Siebert. They practiced together from 1912 to 1923 when Siebert relocated to Los Angeles, California.

Osterman was born in 1862 in Essen, Kingdom of Prussia, and received his architectural education in Düsseldorf. He immigrated to the United States in 1889, arriving in Walla Walla that same year where he took up work as a carpenter and home-builder for a decade before opening his architectural practice in 1899. Osterman would be Walla Walla's leading architect over the next several decades, designing most of the city's prominent commercial and public buildings as well as the new county courthouse. Siebert, a native of Walla Walla, joined the firm in 1902 at age 18, working under Osterman as a draftsman for several years before heading East to finish his architectural education and briefly working in a firm in Pittsfield, Massachusetts. He returned to Walla Walla in 1912 and joined Osterman as a full partner. The firm's work included Dixie High School and the Liberty Theater. Henry Osterman is credited with designing the Electric Light Works Building, Green Park School and the Walla Walla Public Library. Outside of Walla Walla the firm designed Preston Hall.

== Work credited to Henry Osterman and his firm ==
- Dixie School (1921)
- Walla Walla Armory (1920)
- Courty Courthouse (1916)
- Preston Hall (1913) in Waitsburg
- Ellis Hotel
- Siel Building
- Walla Walla High School & Gym
- Central Fire Station
- Jefferson School
- City Hall
- YMCA Building
- Green Park School
- Sharpstein School
- Prospect Point School
- Masonic Temple (1905)
- Carnegie Library (1905)
- Central Christian Church
- Phi Delta Theta House (Whitman College)
- Lincoln School (1926)
- Weston Middle School (1926) in Weston

== See also ==
- National Register of Historic Places listings in Walla Walla County, Washington
