= National Register of Historic Places listings in Columbia County, Washington =

Location of Columbia County in Washington

This list presents the full set of buildings, structures, objects, sites, or districts designated on the National Register of Historic Places in Columbia County, Washington, and offers brief descriptive information about each of them. The National Register recognizes places of national, state, or local historic significance across the United States. Out of over 90,000 National Register sites nationwide, Washington is home to approximately 1,500, and 20 of those are found partially or wholly in Columbia County.

This National Park Service list is complete through NPS recent listings posted June 6, 2026.

== Current listings ==
	Name on the Register	Image	Date listed	Location	City or town	Description
1	Bank of Starbuck	Bank of Starbuck	February 8, 1978 (#78002739)	Main and McNeil Sts. 46°31′11″N 118°07′35″W	Starbuck	
2	A. H. Bishop House	A. H. Bishop House	August 13, 1986 (#86001516)	622 E. Richmond; 46°19′33″N 117°58′31″W	Dayton	
3	John Brining House	John Brining House	August 13, 1986 (#86001517)	410 N. First; 46°19′23″N 117°58′54″W	Dayton	
4	Columbia County Courthouse	Columbia County Courthouse	February 10, 1975 (#75001845)	341 E. Main; 46°19′17″N 117°58′40″W	Dayton	
5	Dexter House No. 1	Dexter House No. 1	August 13, 1986 (#86001519)	515 S. Fourth; 46°19′06″N 117°58′18″W	Dayton	
6	Dexter House No. 2	Dexter House No. 2	August 13, 1986 (#86001520)	507 N. Third; 46°19′28″N 117°58′47″W	Dayton	
7	Downtown Dayton Historic District	Downtown Dayton Historic District	May 31, 1999 (#99000567)	Roughly along Main St., from Front to third Sts. 46°19′15″N 117°58′41″W	Dayton	
8	Frank Flintner House	Frank Flintner House	August 13, 1986 (#86001522)	214 S. Sixth; 46°19′15″N 117°58′18″W	Dayton	
9	Guernsey-Sturdevant Building	Guernsey-Sturdevant Building	January 12, 1993 (#92001589)	225 E. Main St. 46°19′12″N 117°58′45″W	Dayton	
10	Grover J. Israel House	Grover J. Israel House	August 13, 1986 (#86001525)	305 S. Sixth; 46°19′15″N 117°58′21″W	Dayton	Address is 307 S. Sixth per WISAARD# 674503
11	Mancel Kelley House	Mancel Kelley House	August 13, 1986 (#86001526)	1301 S. Fifth; 46°18′37″N 117°57′41″W	Dayton	
12	Mill House	Mill House	August 13, 1986 (#86001528)	504 N. First; 46°19′25″N 117°58′57″W	Dayton	
13	Andrew Nilsson House	Andrew Nilsson House	August 13, 1986 (#86001530)	312 E. Patit; 46°19′23″N 117°58′45″W	Dayton	
14	Oregon Railway and Navigation Company Depot – Dayton	Oregon Railway and Navigation Company Depot – Dayton	November 19, 1974 (#74001949)	222 E. Commercial St. 46°19′15″N 117°58′44″W	Dayton	Originally listed on the National Register as "Dayton Depot". The listing name was changed when the National Park Service accepted updated documentation for the depot in 2017.
15	Dr. Marcel Pietrzycki House	Dr. Marcel Pietrzycki House	August 13, 1986 (#86001531)	415 E. Clay; 46°19′16″N 117°58′31″W	Dayton	
16	Snake River Bridge	Snake River Bridge	July 16, 1982 (#82004207)	N of SR 12; 46°35′28″N 118°13′28″W	Lyons Ferry	Historic Bridges and Tunnels in Washington TR
17	South Side Historic District	South Side Historic District	August 13, 1986 (#86001515)	Roughly bounded by Clay, Third, Park, and First Sts. 46°19′04″N 117°58′33″W	Dayton	
18	J. A. Thronson House	J. A. Thronson House	August 13, 1986 (#86001532)	510 S. Fourth; 46°19′05″N 117°58′19″W	Dayton	
19	Washington Street Historic District	Washington Street Historic District	August 13, 1986 (#86001514)	Roughly Washington St. between Patit Creek and Third St. 46°19′19″N 117°58′49″W	Dayton	
20	Jacob Weinhard House	Jacob Weinhard House	August 13, 1986 (#86001524)	NW of Dayton; 46°19′17″N 117°59′47″W	Dayton	

== See also ==
- National Register of Historic Places listings in Washington state
- Listings in neighboring counties: Franklin, Garfield, Umatilla, Walla Walla, Wallowa, Whitman
- Historic preservation
- History of Washington (state)
- Index of Washington (state)-related articles
