= Bank of Starbuck =

- U.S. National Register of Historic Places
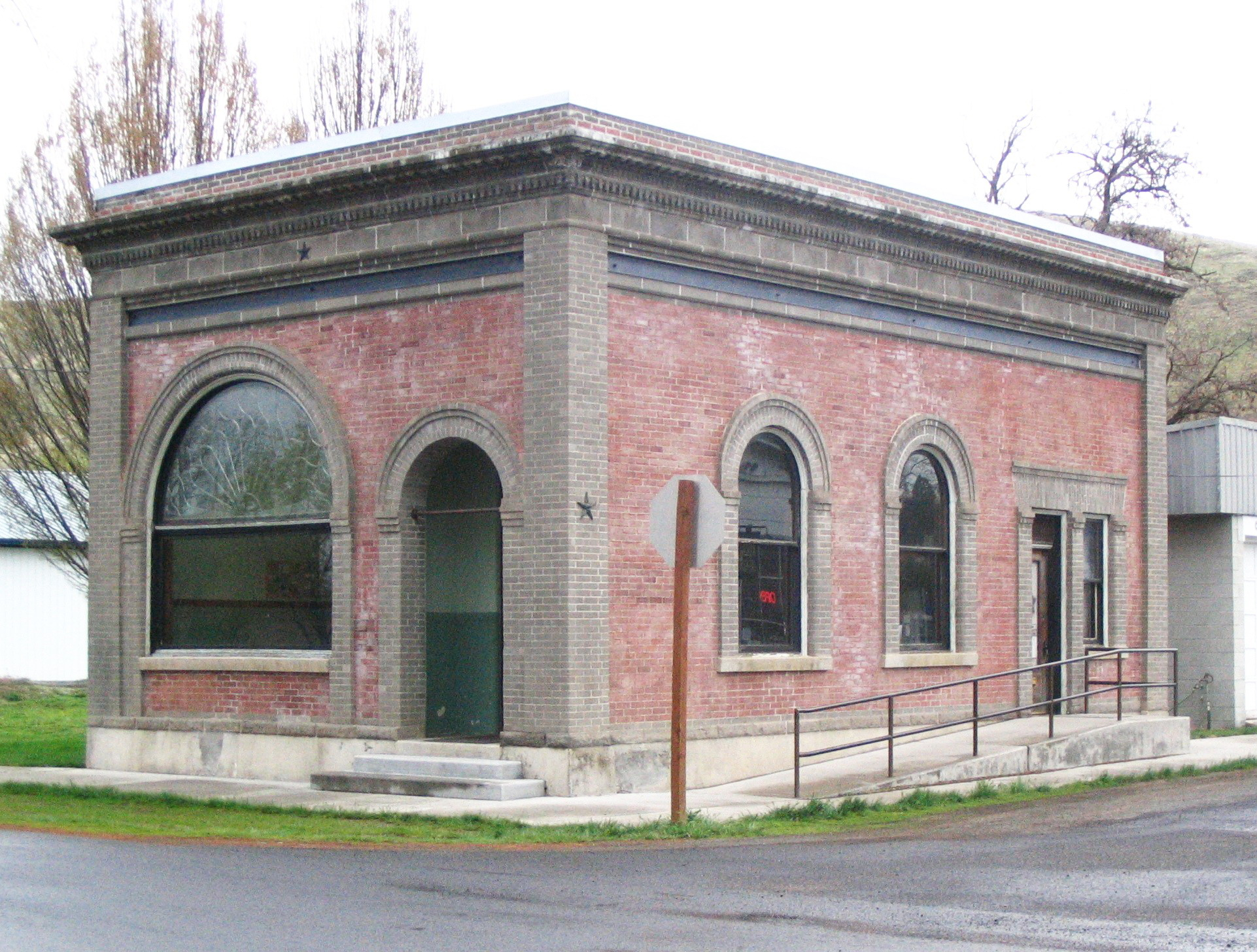

- Location within Washington (state)
- Location: Main and McNeil Sts., Starbuck, Washington
- Coordinates: 46°31′11″N 118°7′35″W
- Area: less than one acre
- Built: 1904
- NRHP reference No.: 78002739
- Added to NRHP: February 8, 1978

The Bank of Starbuck, at Main and McNeil Sts. in Starbuck, Washington, is a historic building built in 1904. After the bank closed in the 1930s, it was taken over by the city for use as City Hall. It was listed on the National Register of Historic Places in 1978.

It was deemed significant as one of few surviving commercial buildings from the town of Starbuck's heyday, after the Oregon Railroad and Navigation Company's main railway line came through in 1882. Its NRHP nomination also asserts it is a "fine example" of a small town bank in the U.S. west.
