= Kirkman House, Arnprior =

Historic building in Arnprior, Ontario, Canada

Coordinates: 45.43899°N 76.35222°W

Kirkman House
- Location: 294 John Street North, Arnprior, Ontario

Kirkman House is an historic building in Arnprior, Ontario in Canada

The house was built in the 1870s. In 1916, it was converted into the Sacred Heart Convent. In 1996 it was renamed Kirkman House opened as a bed and breakfast.

The house is site #13 on a heritage trail of Arnprior historic sites.
