= Preston Hall (Waitsburg, Washington) =

- U.S. National Register of Historic Places
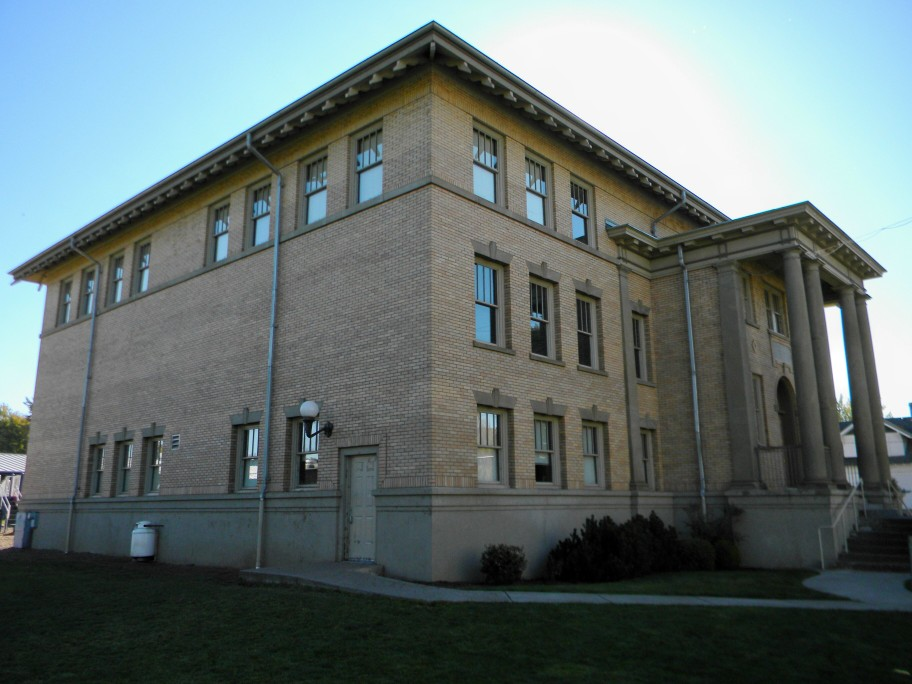

- Location within Washington (state) Location within the United States
- Location: 605 Main St., Waitsburg, Washington
- Coordinates: 46.2662°N 118.1546°W
- Area: 3 acres (1.2 ha)
- Built: 1913
- Architect: Osterman & Siebert
- Architectural style: Classical Revival
- NRHP reference No.: 92001590
- Added to NRHP: January 12, 1993

The Preston Hall in Waitsburg, Washington is a three-story Classical Revival building that was built as a school building in 1913. It was designed by Walla Walla architects Osterman & Siebert.

The building cost $30,000 and equipping it cost another $5,000. It was funded by William G. Preston, a successful businessman who was Waitsburg's first mayor.

It was listed on the U.S. National Register of Historic Places in 1993.
