= Electric Light Works Building =

- U.S. National Register of Historic Places
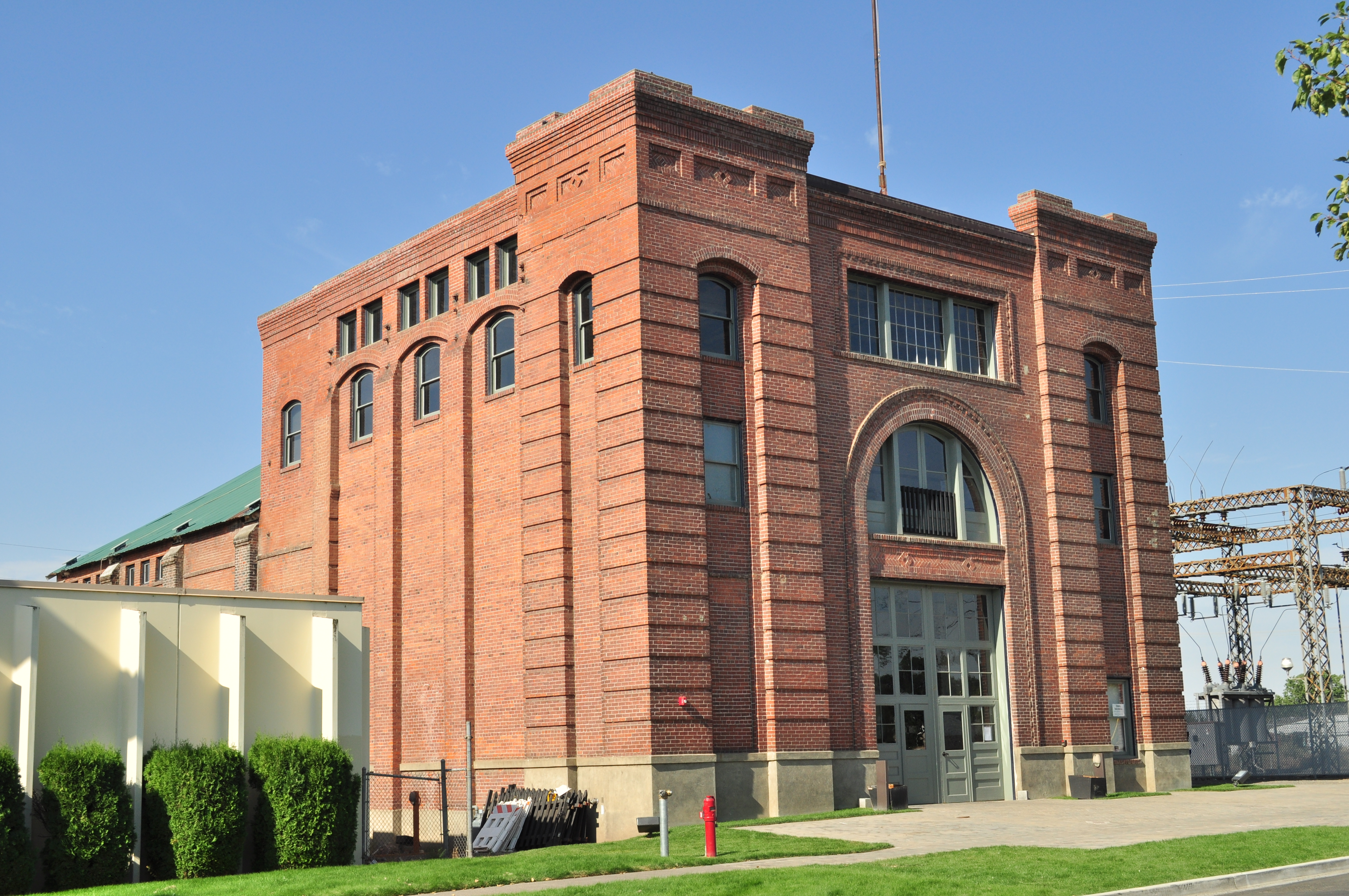
- Gesa Power House Theatre
- Location: 116 N. 6th Avenue Walla Walla, Washington
- Coordinates: 46°03′56″N 118°20′45″W
- Architect: Henry Osterman
- NRHP reference No.: 11001013
- Added to NRHP: January 4, 2012

The Electric Light Works Building, also known as Gesa Power House Theatre, is a noteworthy building in Walla Walla, Washington that has aided in the growth and success of the city. It started out as a substation in the early 20th century, supplying Walla Walla with electricity. It was one of the first substations that converted hydropower to electricity in Washington state and is a good example of industrial architecture in the 1900s. Today it is as much a symbol of Walla Walla’s history as it is of the ever-changing culture of Walla Walla.

== History ==
The Electric Light Works Building was built in 1890 by the Walla Walla Gas Company to produce coal gas and carry it underground to light the streets, businesses, and homes of Walla Walla. It was then converted into an electric plant with a steam engine. This plant engine, however, could not produce enough electricity for Walla Walla and was enlarged soon after. Then, in 1904, Northwestern Gas and Electric Company bought the building with plans to expand electricity in Walla Walla and Pendleton, Oregon. Along with electricity, the company also created the Walla Walla Valley Traction Company in 1906 which was a streetcar company that provided transportation throughout the city and to Milton-Freewater, Oregon. During 1909 and 1910, the ownership of the plant changed hands several times with Pacific Power and Light Company eventually buying it. During 1910 an addition was built to be a two-story brick substation. This substation was designed by Henry Osterman, a prominent architect originally from Germany, who had settled in Walla Walla. In 1948, renovations were made to the building to create two small office spaces from former feeder regulator vaults and add some windows and doors. These offices were used by the superintendent and the operator, who oversaw the local Pacific Power branch. This building continued to be used until the late 1960s but was deteriorating. In 1972, parts of the old gas plant were demolished, leaving part of the 1890 building and the 1910 addition of the Electric Light Works Building. For at least 40 years this building remained vacant, until in December 1994 Pacific Power and Light donated the building to the Port of Walla Walla. In 2011, the building was registered on the National Register of Historic Places. That same year, construction started on the building to transform it into a theater for the performing arts. Today it is a local landmark in Walla Walla that regularly hosts plays and other events.

== Hydroelectricity ==
Early hydroelectric plants such as the Electric Light Works Building record the evolving technology of power in the 20th century. In 1892, a Pelton water wheel was installed on Mill Creek, five miles east of town, to drive a generator of the old Thompson Houston type. This generator delivered power directly to Walla Walla. There was also a steam plant in town which acted as an auxiliary electricity source because the Mill Creek facility had no storage space and the creek had very low flow in summer months, making service unreliable. By 1900, the community was complaining about lack of capacity of this system. When the Northwestern Gas and Electric Company bought the Walla Walla Gas Company, it built the Walla Walla River hydroelectric plant, which was one of the pioneering facilities to use significant engineering advances. This gave a new and improved source of power to both Walla Walla and Pendleton. During this time period other hydroelectric plants were being built in Washington because the cheapest available sources of power known were the falls and rapids of the rivers and mountain streams. Washington was in high supply of these, for it had more undeveloped water power within its boundaries than any other state in the Union. This use of hydropower has continued on to this day, with there being 1,233 regulated dams in Washington State.

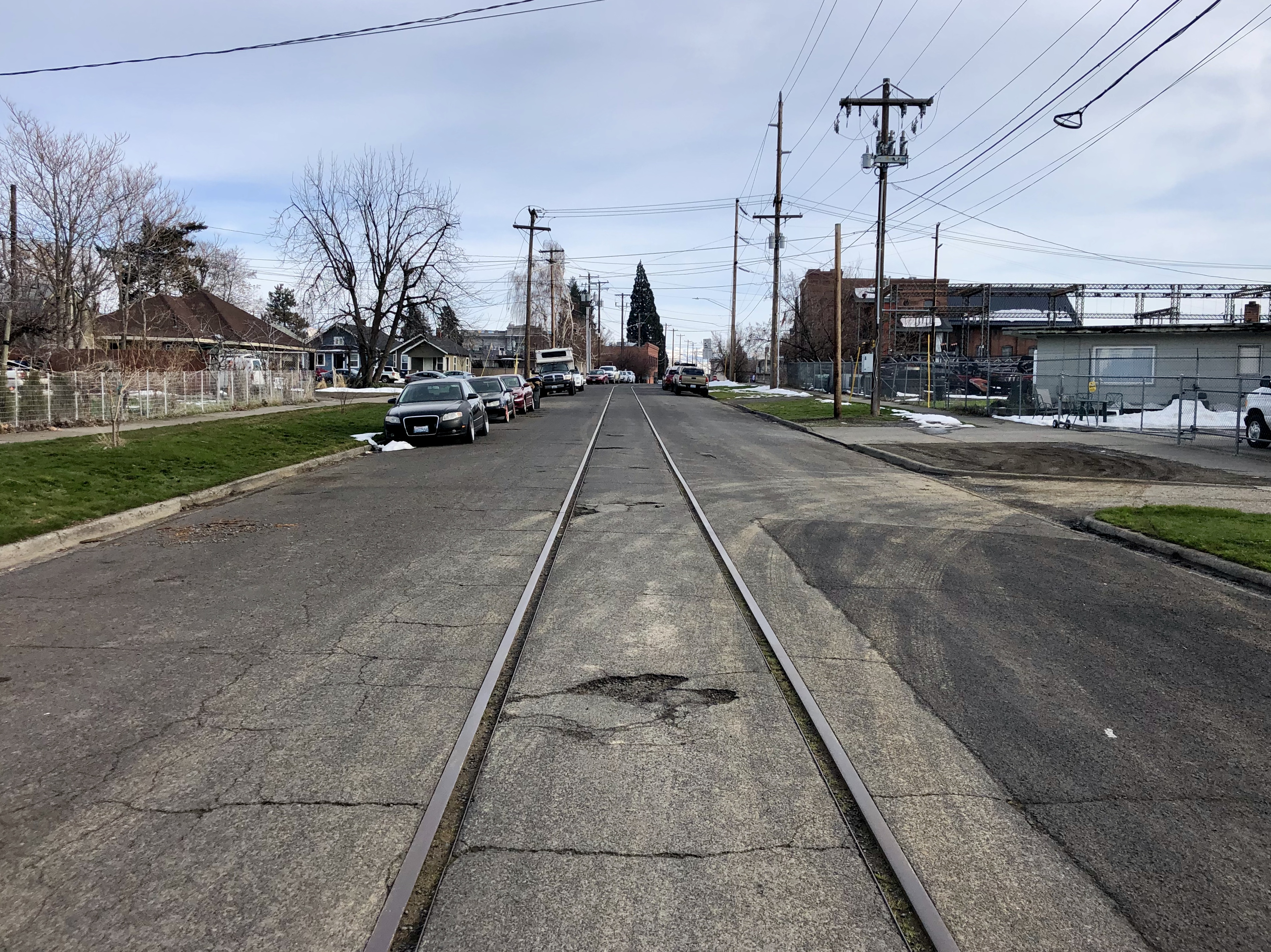
Walla Walla Valley Traction Company tracks from the early 1900s

== Transportation ==
During the late 1800s and early 1900s, electric companies overestimated how much energy consumers would use and saw business slow down since people only needed power for a few hours a day. Traction and streetcar companies were a way for electric companies to sell more energy with a relatively small investment. In 1906, the Northwestern Gas & Electric Company organized the Walla Walla Valley Traction Company to provide electric streetcar and interurban transportation to the city. It provided transportation throughout Walla Walla with 12 miles of streetcar track and to other communities nearby, such as Milton Freewater. The busier routes had streetcars running every twenty minutes while the interurban routes had hourly trips. Before the passenger business was overtaken by the automobile, this railway carried as many as 1,285,000 persons annually. As of 2019 the tracks are still visible throughout the streets of Walla Walla, some even passing right by the Electric Light Works Building.

== Economic growth ==
Throughout the early 1900s, the economy of Walla Walla was constantly changing and growing. This was partly due to the rise of automobiles and appliances. Electrical appliance sales for Pacific Power and Light Company (PPL) in 1928 totaled $1,072,605 compared to $792,072 the year before. However, in 1929, the stock market crash occurred, marking the start of the Great Depression. As a result, consumers used less power so Pacific Power cut rates. These reduced rates allowed customers to therefore use more electricity, balancing out the loss of money from reduced rates for Pacific Power. During the 1920s, PPL also had to combat public utility districts (PUDs) which public ownership advocates saw as cheap government power. Although there was a big push for PUDs, the Walla Walla City Commission and Chamber of Commerce didn’t want a PUD and asked Pacific Power to stay private since customers would have had to subsidize the PUD, whereas PPL paid for those costs themselves. This worked in Pacific Power’s favor since they needed the community’s support to sell more power. In 1935, PPL came up with a marketing strategy that compared kilowatt-hours to crops that were produced in the Walla Walla Valley. If people had more than they could consume when harvesting wheat or vegetables, they could simply can or sack the excess. Kilowatts couldn’t be stored so PPL came up with the slogan of “you can’t can kilowatts” and appealed to the public by stating that the company’s progress depended on the progress of the community. This strategy worked, and in the following years, power usage increased.

== Architecture ==
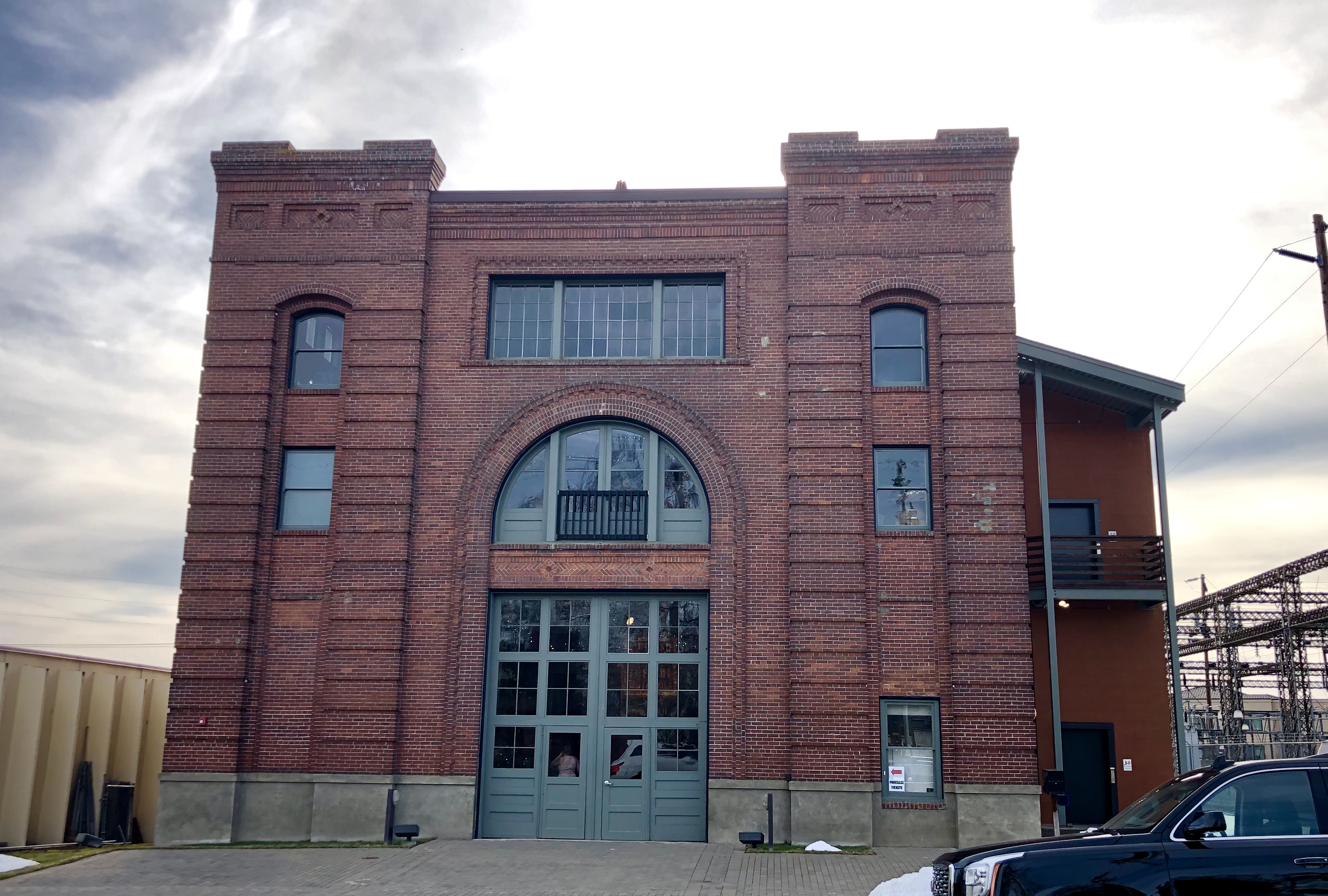
Electric Light Works Building 2019

The Electric Light Works Building is one of only three known surviving examples in Washington State of a 19th century powerhouse which was built solely for power generation and distribution. It was built out of red brick — as were many buildings at the time — in an industrial vernacular style. This building also shows the growth and advancement of the power industry, as an addition was needed in 1910 to house more electrical equipment for generating and distributing electricity (instead of equipment for gas as the 1890 section of the building originally had). The open floor plan and lack of embellishment on the outside of the building show the emphasis that was put on functionality over aesthetics for industrial buildings of this time. There were fewer windows in the 1910 addition as well, indicating a greater reliance on electric lighting versus natural lighting. Over the decades, this building has stayed true to its original industrial style while continuing to show the changes in American culture as it transitioned to a theater.

== Current day ==
In 2011, the interior of the Electric Light Works Building was transformed into a performing arts theater in a similar style to the Blackfriars Theatre in London, which Shakespeare used in 1608. The Walla Walla theater was built in a decommissioned electric plant just as the original Blackfriars Theatre was built in a decommissioned monastery. It was envisioned in a similar manner as Blackfriars; so that all parts of theater could be “seen.” As renovations started, one goal was to incorporate aspects of the electric building with the theater instead of completely tearing it down. The main space of the 1910 addition became the new theater lobby, while the 1890 portion was converted into an auditorium, with a small stage and fixed seating installed. Balcony seating was also added, and the lighting and control booth was positioned at an existing concrete extension of the 1910 mezzanine level. This theater, now referred to as the Gesa Power House Theatre, has hosted many performing arts events such as the Walla Walla Chamber Music Festival, the Whitman Summer Dance Lab, and modern plays. As of 2019, the sponsor for the theater is Gesa Credit Union, which entered into an 11-year contract with the theater. Gesa President and Chief Executive Officer Christina Lethlean said the credit union’s aim is to support the communities in which it operates and that she believes promoting the arts is important.
