= U.S. Post Office – Prosser Main =

Historic building in Washington, United States

- U.S. National Register of Historic Places
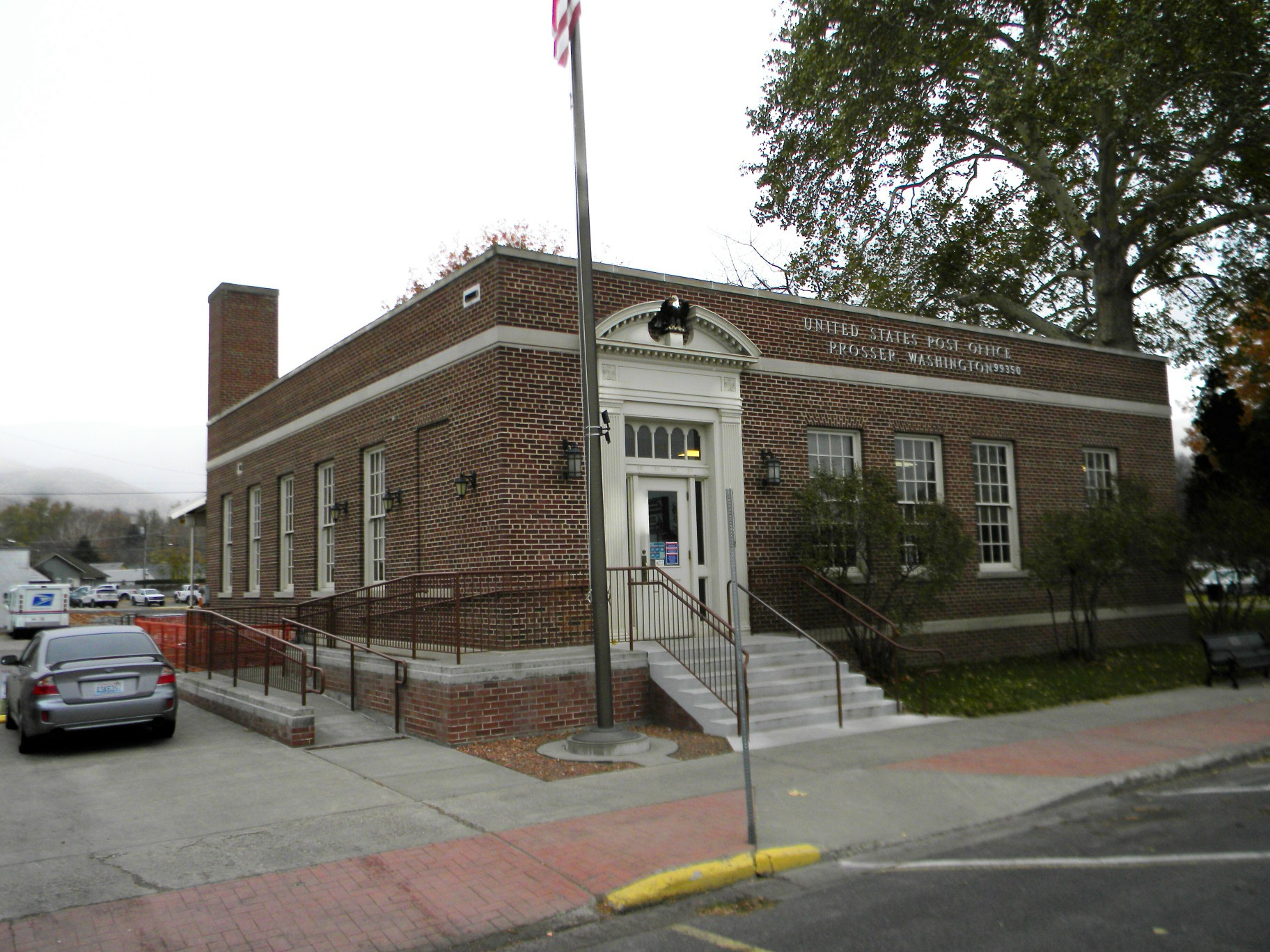
- Prosser Main Post Office

- Location within Washington (state) Location within the United States
- Location: Meade Avenue, Prosser
- Coordinates: 46.20422°N 119.77043°W
- Built: 1935
- Architectural style: Starved Classicism
- NRHP reference No.: 91000653
- Added to NRHP: 1991

The Prosser Main Post Office is a depression-era federally-constructed US Post Office. It is a single level brick edifice located on East Meade Avenue in downtown Prosser.

The Post Office is known both as an example of the Starved Classicism style construction typical of government projects of the mid to late 1930s, and for its lobby mural. The building was completed in 1935, and the mural was completed in 1937.

The lobby mural is a work by Ernest Norling entitled "Mail Train in the 80's". It depicts mail delivery at the Northern Pacific's depot platform in the 1880s. Ernest Norling was a PWAP artist from Pasco who is known for his New Deal era murals in Seattle, and other places.

The Post Office was added to the National Register of Historic Places in 1991.
