= Beverly, Washington =

Unincorporated community in Washington, United States

- Unincorporated community
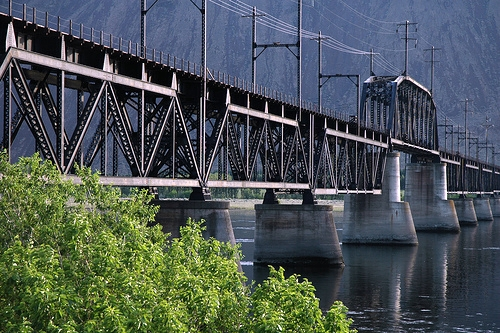
- Beverly Railroad Bridge over the Columbia River at Beverly

- Location within Washington (state)
- Coordinates: 46°50′05″N 119°55′49″W
- Country: United States
- State: Washington
- County: Grant
- Elevation: 574 ft (175 m)
- Time zone: UTC-8 (Pacific (PST))
  - Summer (DST): UTC-7 (PDT)
- ZIP code: 99321
- Area code: 509
- GNIS feature ID: 2631207

Beverly, Washington, United States, is a small unincorporated community along the banks of the Columbia River in central Washington state. The community, which consists of a few hundred residents, is a few miles downriver from Wanapum Dam and is nestled at the base of Sentinel Gap, a water gap in the Saddle Mountains that predates the Columbia River. The population as of 2020 was 266.

== History ==
Beverly was named around 1905 by H.R. Williams, after Beverly, Massachusetts.

Beverly played host to hundreds of railroad workers from 1905-1920s when the Milwaukee Railroad was being built. The Milwaukee constructed the million-dollar Beverly Railroad Bridge across the Columbia just north of Beverly, which was completed in 1909. Supplies to build the bridge were shipped via steamboat from points upstream, and were hauled in on other rail lines. The bridge took nearly two years to complete.

Beverly's early success depended partially on steep grades on the railroad, which meant helper locomotives were required to drive the trains. Colorful brochures were printed and distributed back east by companies touting Beverly's long growing season and sheltered location.

In 1977, the Milwaukee Road filed bankruptcy, and in the early 1980s Washington State removed the rail from east of Beverly to a junction near Royal City. However, the hundred-year-old black iron bridge still stands today crossing the river.

During World War II and continuing up to the 1980s, thousands of rail cars moved through Beverly en route to the nearby Hanford facility. During that time the station in Beverly (now vacated) was remodeled and enhanced. Sometime in the late 1990s to early 2000s, the train station was demolished.

== Climate ==
According to the Köppen Climate Classification system, Beverly has a semi-arid climate, abbreviated "BSk" on climate maps.

== Education ==
The area is served by the Royal School District.

== Demographics ==
Historical population
Census	Pop.	Note	%±
2020	266		—
U.S. Decennial Census

Beacon Hill first appeared as a census designated place in the 2020 U.S. census.

=== Racial and ethnic composition ===
Beverly CDP, Washington – Racial and ethnic composition Note: the US Census treats Hispanic/Latino as an ethnic category. This table excludes Latinos from the racial categories and assigns them to a separate category. Hispanics/Latinos may be of any race.
Race / Ethnicity (NH = Non-Hispanic)	Pop 2020	2020
White alone (NH)	8	3.01%
Black or African American alone (NH)	0	0.00%
Native American or Alaska Native alone (NH)	0	0.00%
Asian alone (NH)	0	0.00%
Native Hawaiian or Pacific Islander alone (NH)	0	0.00%
Other race alone (NH)	0	0.00%
Mixed race or Multiracial (NH)	4	1.50%
Hispanic or Latino (any race)	254	95.49%
Total	266	100.00%
