= Snake River Archaeological Site =

Historic district in Washington, United States

- Snake River Archeological District
- U.S. National Register of Historic Places
- U.S. Historic district
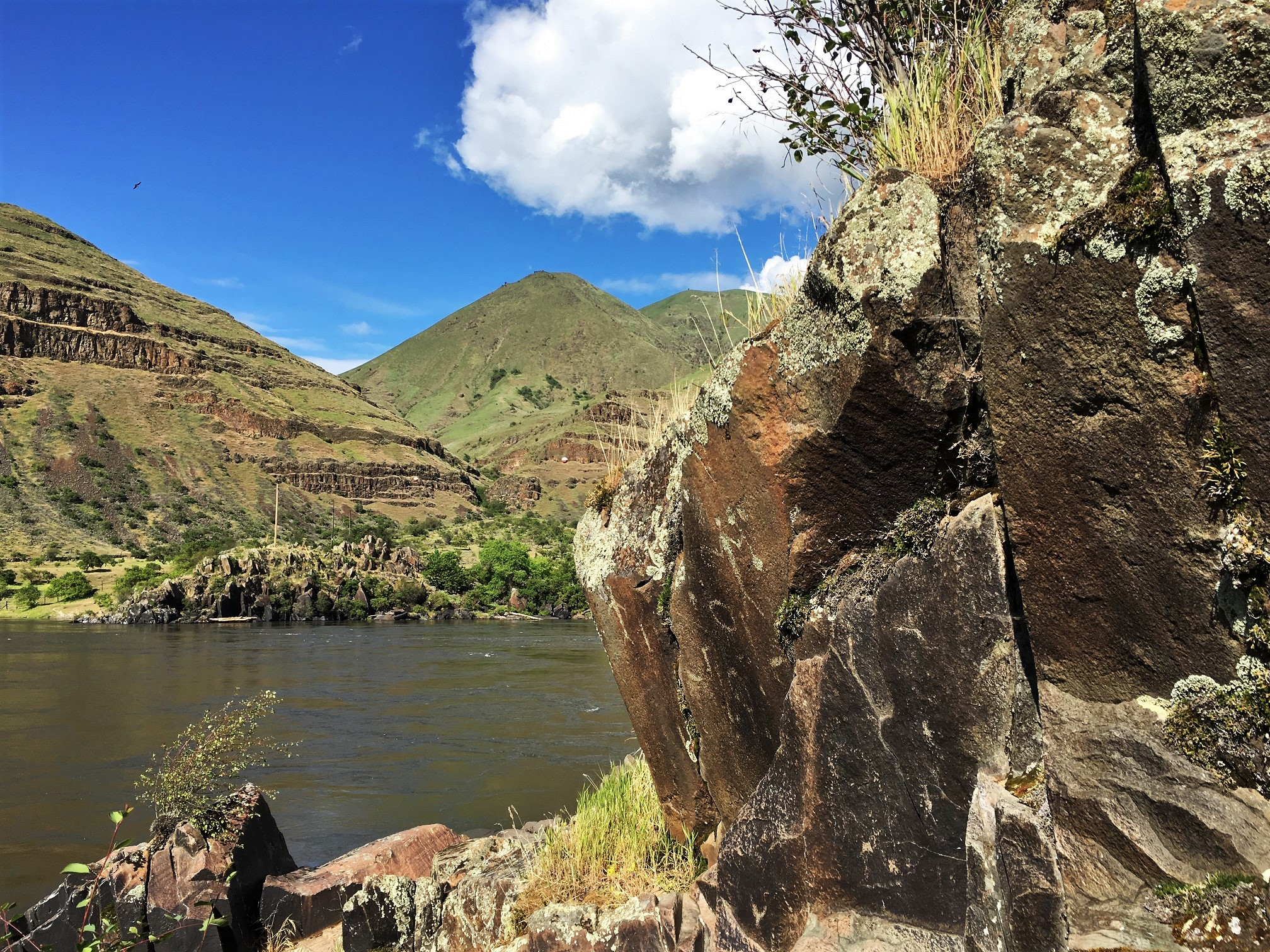
- Location: Address restricted, Asotin County, Washington
- Nearest city: Clarkston, Washington
- Area: 4,640 acres (18.8 km^{2})
- NRHP reference No.: 76001868
- Added to NRHP: May 13, 1976

- Nez Perce Snake River Archeological District
- U.S. National Register of Historic Places
- U.S. Historic district
- Location: Address restricted, Nez Perce County, Idaho
- Nearest city: Lewiston, Idaho
- Area: 3,500 acres (14 km^{2})
- NRHP reference No.: 78001086
- Added to NRHP: December 22, 1978

The Snake River Archaeological District is an archaeological area in the United States, located in Nez Perce County, Idaho, and Asotin County, Washington, and centered on the Snake River, which divides the two states. The area includes a number of sites inhabited by the Nez Perce people, who used it as a fishing ground and a winter campsite. Settlement in the area stretches from roughly 6000 B.C. to the 20th century A.D. Several hundred pictographs are part of the area, usually painted at village sites.

It includes the confluence of Redbird Creek and the Snake River.

The Washington part of the site, west of Snake River and comprising 4,640 acres (18.8 km^{2}) in Asotin County, Washington was added as the Snake River Archeological District to the National Register in 1976.

The Idaho part of the site, east of Snake River and comprising 3,500 acres (14 km^{2}) in Nez Perce County, Idaho was added as the Nez Perce Snake River Archaeological District to the National Register in 1978.
