= Kirkman House (Walla Walla, Washington) =

Historic house in Washington, United States

- U.S. National Register of Historic Places
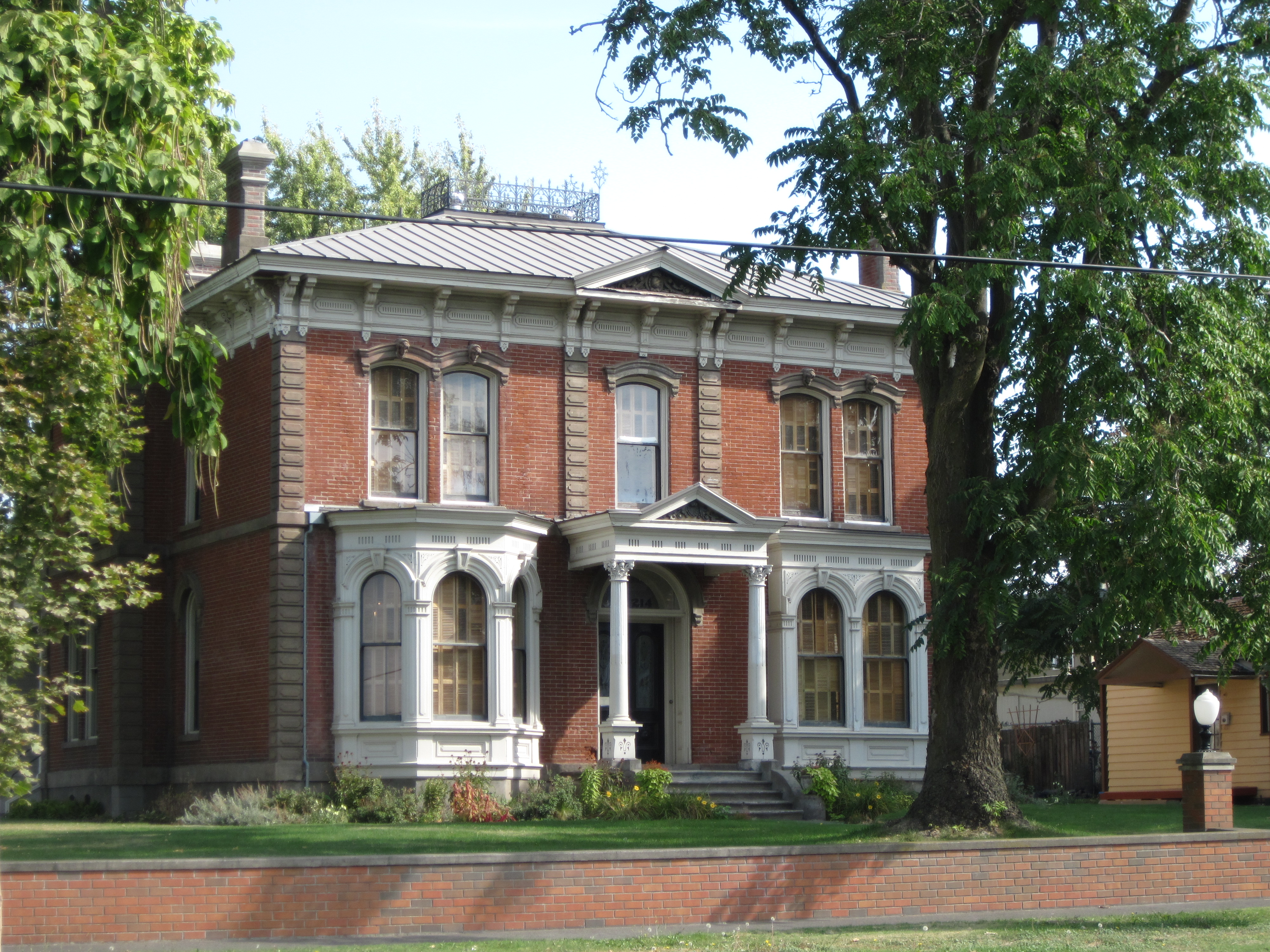

- Location within Washington (state)
- Interactive map showing the location of Kirkman House
- Location: 214 N. Colville Street; Walla Walla, Washington
- Coordinates: 46°4′12.98″N 118°20′22.57″W
- Built: 1876
- Architect: Freeman P. Allen
- NRHP reference No.: 74001986
- Added to NRHP: December 27, 1974

The Kirkman House is a historic house in Walla Walla, Washington. The Kirkman house is one of the Northwest's most outstanding Victorian structures. It was built by William Kirkman, who left Bolton, England in the middle of the 19th century and made money in cattle in the West. The family moved into the home in 1880, and it was home to three generations of Kirkmans before the family gave it to Whitman College in 1919.

== William and Isabella Kirkman ==
William Kirkman came to Boston from Lancashire County, England as a young man in the 1850s. His goal was to sell textiles, but he was lured to California by the Gold Rush. His quest for wealth via prospecting led him also to British Columbia, Australia and Idaho. He also invested in cattle in California and drove them to Boise and in 1866 he drove a pack train of miners' supplies from Walla Walla, Washington to Montana.

William met Isabella Potts in San Francisco and they married in 1867. They moved to Idaho where William continued his interest in the cattle business. After a brief return to California, they moved to Walla Walla and made it their permanent home. William Kirkman formed a partnership in cattle with John Dooley, which was a successful one despite a heavy loss of livestock during the severe winter of 1881. William also became involved in wheat farming as well as cattle, and operated two farms.

Although he had left his family back in England, William was a regular correspondent. He sent not only letters, but sometimes gold dust to his father and stepmother. In time he was able to convince two of his brothers, James and John, to immigrate to the United States. John Kirkman involved himself in William's businesses and became active in community affairs.

William Kirkman was a generous and civic-minded man. He was a Walla Walla City officer and on the board at the Penitentiary. He and Isabella were strong supporters of education and William served on the Board of Education for the public schools. All four of the Kirkman children attended Whitman College, and William was a member of their board of trustees. He was involved in politics, too, and in 1892 was elected a delegate to the Republican National Convention in Minneapolis.

It was that same year that William, Isabella, Fanny Ann and William Henry traveled to Ireland, England and the Continent to see Isabella's parents and William's relatives, and to shop for wedding clothes for Fanny Ann's upcoming marriage. However, on the way home William Kirkman died on the train while traveling through Wisconsin. When the news of his death reached Walla Walla, the flag at the city hall was hung at half-mast. The newspaper described his funeral: "The house was crowded with sorrowing friends, as was also the yard and streets surrounding the residence."

== Restoration ==
By the late 20th century the home was in great disrepair and Walla Walla was in danger of losing it to deterioration. In 1977, the home was purchased by the Historical Architecture Development Corporation (H.A.D.). They were a group of concerned citizens of Walla Walla who came together to save the historic sites and buildings of this area. The organization used Kirkman House as an office, eventually purchasing it and restoring the home into a period house museum. In 1982, H.A.D. received an award for outstanding work in historic preservation from the Washington State Trust for Historic Preservation. Today the home is privately owned and operates as a non-profit organization under the management of a revolving board of directors.

The Kirkman House has been listed on the American National Register of Historic Places since December 1974.
