= Beverly Railroad Bridge =

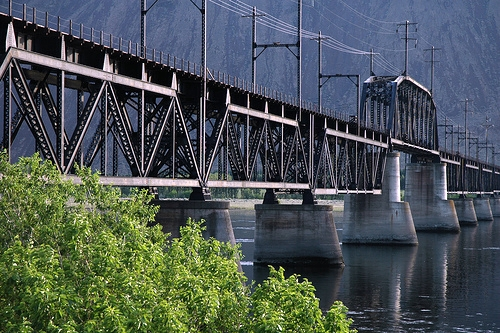
- Coordinates: 46°49′52″N 119°56′53″W
- Carries: hikers, pedestrians, and cyclists (formerly: trains)
- Crosses: Columbia River
- Locale: Beverly, Washington
- Other name: Milwaukee Road Columbia River Bridge
- Heritage status: NRHP

Characteristics
- Design: Warren deck trusses, Parker through truss (main span), and deck plate girders (approaches)
- Material: Steel

History
- Construction end: 1909
- Rebuilt: 2019–2022
- Beverly Railroad Bridge
- U.S. National Register of Historic Places
- Location within Washington (state)
- Location: Crosses the Columbia River, Grant / Kittitas counties, Washington
- Nearest city: Beverly, Washington
- Coordinates: 46°49′52″N 119°56′54″W
- Built: 1909
- Architect: Pennsylvania Steel Company
- Architectural style: Warren deck truss, Parker through truss
- MPS: Historic Bridges/Tunnels in Washington State TR
- NRHP reference No.: 82004214
- Added to NRHP: July 16, 1982

Location
- Interactive map of Beverly Railroad Bridge

The Beverly Railroad Bridge is a historic railroad bridge that now carries hikers, bicyclists, and pedestrians over the Columbia River near Beverly, Washington, United States. It was constructed by the Chicago, Milwaukee, St. Paul and Pacific Railroad (otherwise known as The Milwaukee Road) in 1909 during its Pacific Extension. In 1906, The Milwaukee Road began construction on its transcontinental rail line from Chicago, Illinois to Tacoma, Washington, which was completed three years later.

The bridge was built on concrete piers 85 feet (25.9 m) above the Columbia River to provide clearance for any river traffic. The spans include 14 Warren deck trusses, one Parker through truss, and deck plate girders on the approaches. When the railroad electrified in the 1920s, supports for the catenary were added to the bridge.

When the railroad ceased using electric locomotives in 1972, the catenary was removed, but the supports were kept in place.

After the railroad went bankrupt in the mid-1970s and abandoned its lines in the Pacific Northwest in 1980, the bridge and adjoining right-of-way were taken over by the State of Washington in lieu of back taxes owed by the railroad.

The bridge was listed in the National Register of Historic Places in 1982 because of its association with The Milwaukee Road.

The bridge is on the route of the Palouse to Cascades State Park Trail, which follows the Milwaukee Road right-of-way across Washington. The bridge was extensively renovated, and re-opened for trail use in April 2022. One construction worker died during the rehabilitation project from a fall.
