= Lower Snake River Archaeological District =

Historic district in Washington, United States

- U.S. National Register of Historic Places
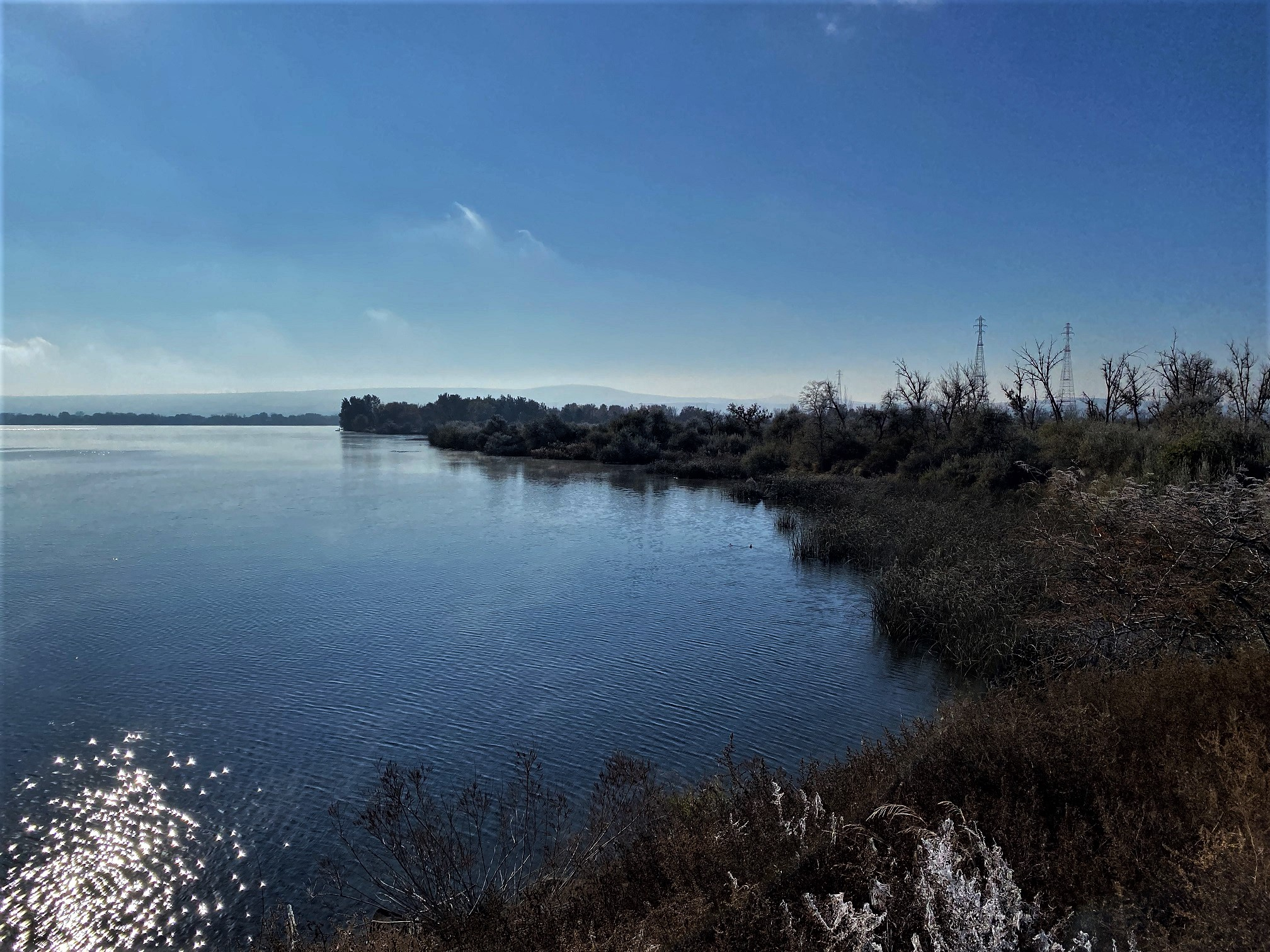
- Nearest city: Pasco, Washington
- Area: 654 acres (2.65 km^{2})
- NRHP reference No.: 84000471
- Added to NRHP: October 29, 1984

The Lower Snake River Archaeological District is a 654-acre (2.65 km^{2}) historic district in Franklin County, Washington and Walla Walla County, Washington, near Pasco which was listed on the National Register of Historic Places in 1984.

The district covers the section of the Snake River between its confluence with the Columbia River and the Ice Harbor Dam. The listing included 14 contributing sites.

== See also ==
- Snake River Archaeological Site
