= Windust Caves Archaeological District =

Historic district in Washington, United States

- U.S. National Register of Historic Places
- U.S. Historic district
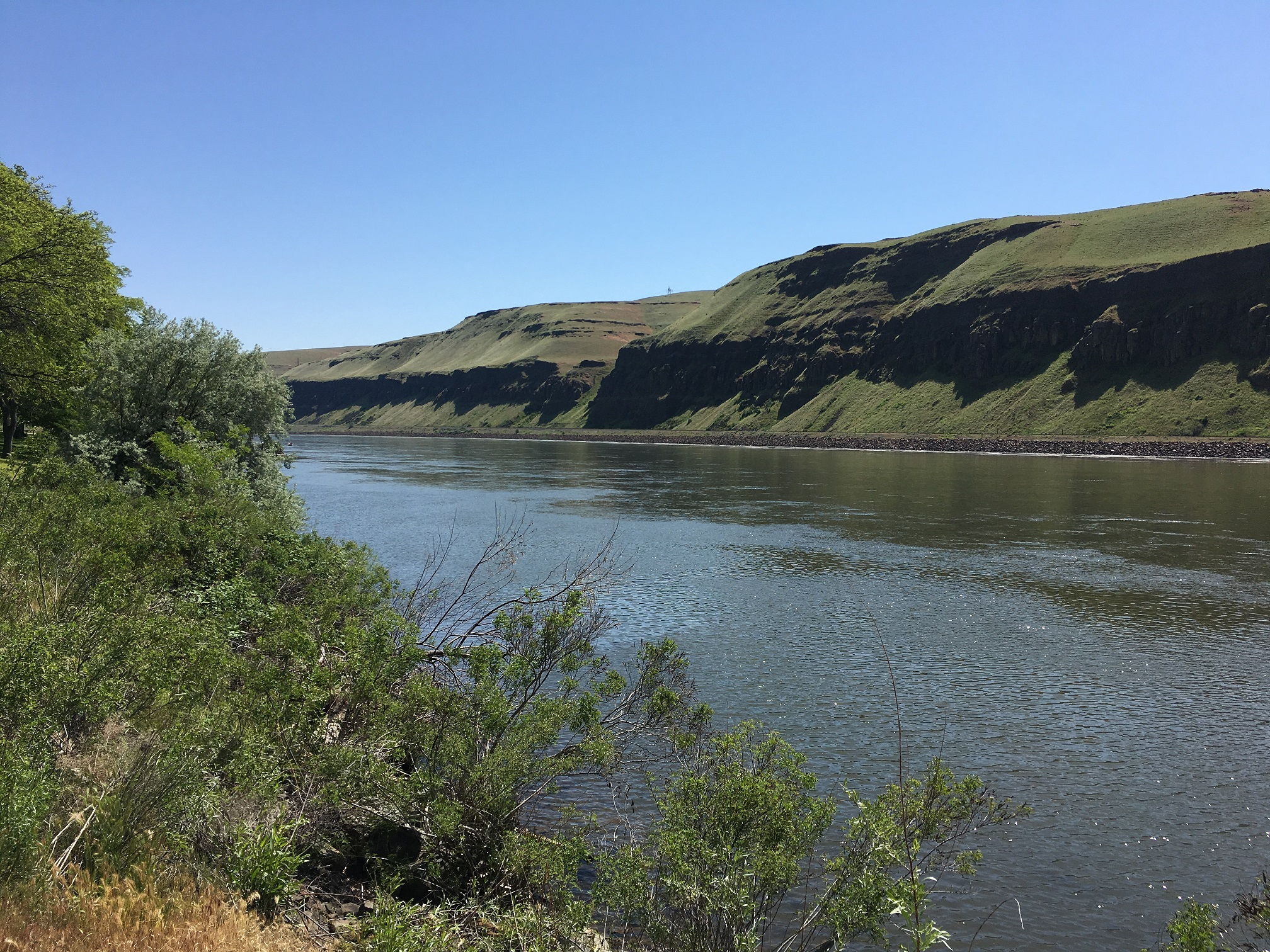
- Location: Franklin County, Washington, USA
- Nearest city: Windust, Washington
- Area: 505 acres (2.04 km^{2})
- NRHP reference No.: 84000479
- Added to NRHP: October 29, 1984

The Windust Caves (45-FR-46) are a series of nine caves eroded into a basalt cliff on the north side of the lower Snake River in Franklin County, southeastern Washington. The caves were excavated from 1959 until 1961 by a crew led by Harvey S. Rice. The site contains cultural artifacts dating back over 10,000 years and is culturally associated with other sites in the Columbia Basin.

The Windust Caves Archaeological District was added to the National Register of Historic Places in 1984.

== Excavation ==
The 1959-1961 excavation of the Windust Caves was conducted as part of an archaeological salvage project in anticipation of the completion of the Ice Harbor Dam, which inundated the site when its reservoir, Lake Sacajawea, was filled in 1962.

Roald H. Fryxell defined ten stratigraphic units above the basalt bedrock. The earliest unit, stratum I, is interpreted as a fluvial gravel deposit of Late Wisconsin age. The earliest evidence of habitation was found in stratum II, with subsequent strata containing fire lenses, stone tools, debitage, bone fragments, and organic materials. The faunal assemblage at the Windust Caves consists almost entirely of large mammals, including bison, pronghorn, mule deer, and white-tailed deer. Artifacts are assigned to five cultural traditions, which are interpreted to represent about 10,000 years of occupation, but these dates are based only on morphological similarity of stone tools to those found at other sites with radiocarbon dates available.

== Cultural Context ==
The Windust Caves and nearby sites, including the Marmes Rockshelter, are associated with the Western Stemmed Tradition (WSPT or WST). The WST is characterized by a type of large, stemmed projectile point and is typically dated to 14,500 to 8200 cal. BP. The WST is now considered by many researchers to have developed contemporaneously with the Clovis tradition based on WST artifacts found in Clovis-aged deposits at the Paisley Caves and other sites, indicating that the Intermountain West may have been an important region in the peopling of the Americas.

Excavations at Windust Cave C established two distinct cultural assemblages. Windust I, dated to 13,100 to 9000 cal. BP, corresponds to the local archaeological phase known as the Windust phase. Windust II is dated to 9000 to 7600 cal. BP and corresponds to the Early Cascade phase.

== Sources ==
- American Antiquity, Vol. 27, No. 4 (Apr., 1962), pp. 607–624 Published by: Society for American Archaeology
- Davis, Loren G. Volcanism, Climate Change, and Prehistoric Cultural Succession in Southern Washington and Northern Idaho.
- Fiedel, Stuart J. (1992). Prehistory of the Americas, Cambridge University Press.
- Kirk, Ruth; Daugherty, Richard D. (2007). Archaeology in Washington, University of Washington Press, ISBN 0-295-98696-4.
- Rice, Harvey (1965). The Cultural Sequence at Windust Caves (Thesis). Washington State University.
