= Tri-Cities Archaeological District =

Historic district in Washington, United States

- U.S. National Register of Historic Places
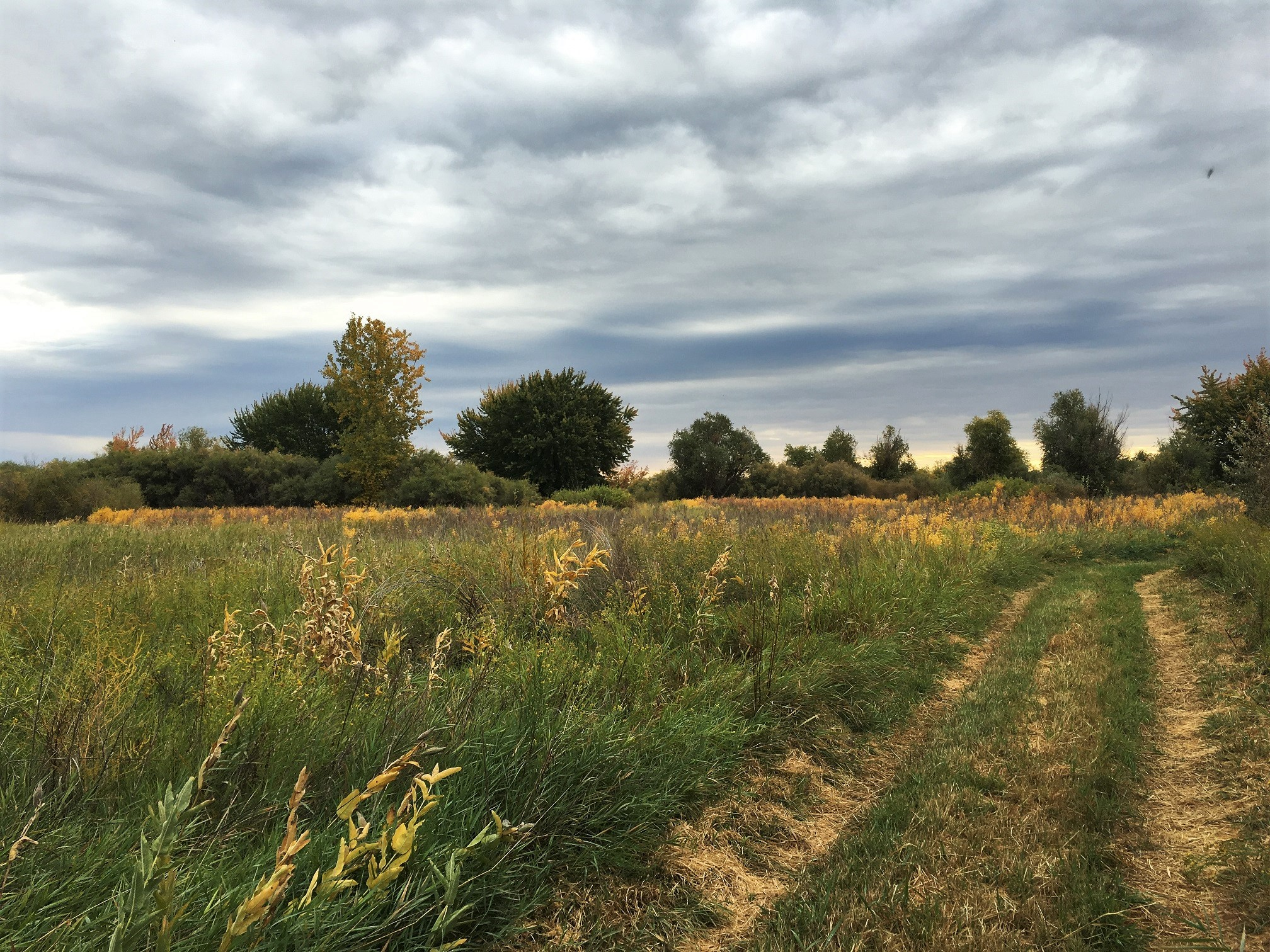
- Nearest city: Kennewick, Washington
- Area: 3,026.7 acres (12.249 km^{2})
- NRHP reference No.: 84000468
- Added to NRHP: October 29, 1984

The Tri-Cities Archaeological District, in Benton County, Washington and Franklin County, Washington, near Kennewick, is a 3,026.7 acres (12.249 km^{2}) historic district which was listed on the National Register of Historic Places in 1984.

The listing included 20 contributing sites and was listed for its information potential.
