= List of bridges on the National Register of Historic Places in Washington (state) =

This is a list of bridges and tunnels on the National Register of Historic Places in the U.S. state of Washington.

Name	Image	Built	Listed	Location	County	Type
12th Avenue South Bridge		1911, 1912	1982-07-16	Seattle; 47°35′46″N 122°18′58″W	King	Steel deck arch
South Park Bridge (Seattle) (14th/16th Avenue South Bridge)		1931	1982-07-16	Seattle; 47°34′13″N 122°21′2″W	King	Rolling lift (Scherzer) bascule, dismantled 2010–2013 and replaced by a new bridge carrying the same name
Agate Pass Bridge		1950	1995-05-24	Suquamish; 47°42′45″N 122°33′54″W	Kitsap	Cantilever
Arboretum Sewer Trestle		1910	1982-07-16	Seattle; 47°38′33″N 122°17′52″W	King	Reinforced concrete closed-spandrel arch
George Washington Memorial Bridge (Aurora Avenue Bridge)		1931	1982-07-16	Seattle; 47°38′37″N 122°20′46″W	King	
Baker River Bridge		1916, 1917	1976-05-04	Concrete; 48°32′28″N 121°44′34″W	Skagit	
Ballard Bridge		1917	1982-07-16	Seattle; 47°39′47″N 122°22′30″W	King	Simple trunnion bascule (double leaf)
Barstow Bridge		1947	1995-03-30	Kettle Falls; 48°47′4″N 118°7′28″W	Ferry	Pratt pony truss
Beverly Railroad Bridge	Beverly Railroad Bridge	1909	1982-07-16	Beverly; 46°49′52″N 119°56′54″W	Grant, Kittitas	Warren deck truss, Parker through truss, deck plate girder
Blue Bridge (Pioneer Memorial Bridge)	Blue Bridge	1954	2002	Kennewick-Pasco; 46°13′10.38″N 119°6′14.54″W	Benton, Franklin	Steel through arch
Capital Boulevard Crossing		1936, 1937	1982-07-16	Tumwater; 47°0′50″N 122°54′7″W	Thurston	
Chinook Pass Entrance Arch	Chinook Pass Entrance Arch	1936	1991-03-13	Chinook Pass; 46°52′20″N 121°30′52″W	Pierce	Timber stringer
Christine Falls Bridge	Christine Falls Bridge	1928	1991-03-13	Paradise; 46°46′51″N 121°46′42″W	Pierce	Reinforced concrete closed-spandrel arch
Murray Morgan Bridge (City Waterway Bridge)		1911	1982-07-16	Tacoma; 47°15′17″N 122°25′35″W	Pierce	Vertical-lift bridge
Columbia River Bridge		1906–1908	1982-07-16	Wenatchee; 47°24′51″N 120°17′54″W	Chelan	Pin-connected cantilever through truss
Columbia River Bridge at Bridgeport	Columbia River Bridge at Bridgeport	1950	1995-05-31	Bridgeport; 48°0′4″N 119°39′13″W	Douglas, Okanogan	Cantilever deck truss
Columbia River Bridge at Kettle Falls	Columbia River Bridge at Kettle Falls	1941	1995-03-28	Kettle Falls; 48°37′34″N 118°7′1″W	Ferry	Cantilever through truss
Columbia River Bridge at Northport		1949	1995-05-24	Northport; 48°55′21″N 117°46′32″W	Stevens	Cantilever through truss
Columbia River Bridge at Wenatchee	Columbia River Bridge at Wenatchee	1950	1995-05-24	Wenatchee; 47°24′36″N 120°17′41″W	Chelan, Douglas	Steel through arch
Cowen Park Bridge	Cowen Park Bridge	1936	1982-07-16	Seattle; 47°40′16″N 122°18′45″W	King	Reinforced concrete open-spandrel arch
Curlew Bridge		1908	1982-07-16	Curlew; 48°53′8″N 118°36′1″W	Ferry	Pin-connected Parker truss
Deception Pass Bridge		1934–1935	1982-07-16	Anacortes; 48°24′22″N 122°38′35″W	Skagit	Steel deck arch
Devil's Corner Cliff Walk	Devil's Corner Cliff Walk	1890s	1974-06-07	Newhalem; 48°41′28″N 121°13′23″W	Whatcom	
Donald-Wapato Bridge		1949	1995-05-24	Wapato; 46°27′58″N 120°23′51″W	Yakima	Reinforced concrete box girder
Duckabush River Bridge		1934	1982-07-16	Duckabush; 47°41′25″N 122°53′52″W	Jefferson	Reinforced concrete through arch
Dungeness River Bridge	Dungeness River Bridge	1930	1982-07-16	Sequim; 48°5′8″N 123°8′46″W	Clallam	Timber Howe truss
East 34th Street Bridge		1937	1982-07-16	Tacoma; 47°14′18″N 122°25′55″W	Pierce	Reinforced concrete open-spandrel arch
Elwha River Bridge		1913	1982-07-16	Elwha; 48°6′4″N 123°33′23″W	Clallam	Warren deck truss
F Street Bridge (Palouse, Washington)	F Street Bridge	1905	1982-07-16	Palouse; 46°54′36″N 117°4′7″W	Whitman	Pin-connected Pratt truss
Fairfax Bridge		1921	1982-07-16	Melmont; 47°2′29″N 122°2′25″W	Pierce	Steel hinged arch. Permanently closed in 2025 and planned for demolition.
Fremont Bridge		1917	1982-07-16	Seattle; 47°38′52″N 122°20′55″W	King	Simple trunnion bascule (double leaf)
Goldsborough Creek Bridge		1923	1982-07-16	Shelton; 47°12′34″N 123°5′57″W	Mason	
Grand Coulee Bridge	Grand Coulee Bridge	1934, 1935	1982-07-16	Grand Coulee; 47°57′56″N 118°58′53″W	Okanogan	Cantilever through truss
Grande Ronde River Bridge	Grande Ronde River Bridge	1941	1995-03-28	Asotin; 46°2′30″N 117°15′4″W	Asotin	Steel built-up girder
Grays River Covered Bridge	Grays River Covered Bridge	1905, 1908	1971-11-23	Grays River; 46°21′17″N 123°34′47″W	Wahkiakum	Timber Howe truss
High Steel Bridge	High Steel Bridge	1929	1982-07-16	Shelton; 47°22′5″N 123°16′44″W	Mason	Steel arch
Hoquiam River Bridge	Hoquiam River Bridge	1928	1982-07-16	Hoquiam; 46°58′32″N 123°52′32″W	Grays Harbor	Strauss bascule
Idaho and Washington Northern Railroad Bridge		1911	1982-07-16	Metaline Falls; 48°46′50″N 117°24′33″W	Pend Oreille	Cantilever
Indian Timothy Memorial Bridge	Indian Timothy Memorial Bridge	1923	1982-07-16	Pomeroy; 46°24′43″N 117°12′46″W	Asotin	Reinforced concrete through arch
Jim Creek Bridge		1943	1995-03-28	Woodland; 45°59′45″N 122°30′55″W	Cowlitz	Reinforced concrete open-spandrel arch
Johnson Bridge		1929	1982-07-16	Lowden; 46°7′22″N 118°38′57″W	Walla Walla	Replaced in 2007
Lake Keechelus Snowshed Bridge	Lake Keechelus Snowshed Bridge	1950	1995-05-24	Hyak; 47°21′20″N 121°21′53″W	Kittitas	Reinforced concrete T-beam
Lewis and Clark Bridge (Columbia River) (Longview Bridge)		1929, 1930	1982-07-16	Longview; 46°6′48″N 122°57′10″W	Cowlitz	Cantilever through truss
Manning-Rye Covered Bridge	Manning-Rye Covered Bridge	ca. 1918	1982-07-16	Colfax; 46°55′42″N 117°24′52″W	Whitman	Timber Howe truss
Marshall Bridge		1949	1995-05-24	Marshall; 47°34′0″N 117°29′32″W	Spokane	Reinforced concrete T-beam
McMillin Bridge		1934	1982-07-16	Puyallup; 47°7′49″N 122°14′7″W	Pierce	Reinforced concrete truss
Middle Fork Nooksack River Bridge		1915, 1951	1982-07-16	Acme; 48°47′5″N 122°6′40″W	Whatcom	Pin-connected Pennsylvania truss
Monroe Street Bridge		1911	1976-05-13	Spokane; 47°39′40″N 117°25′32″W	Spokane	Reinforced concrete open-spandrel arch
Montlake Bridge		1913, 1924	1982-07-16	Seattle; 47°38′51″N 122°18′13″W	King	Simple trunnion bascule (double leaf)
Mount Baker Ridge Tunnel	Mount Baker Ridge Tunnel	1940	1982-07-16	Seattle; 47°35′25″N 122°17′14″W	King	
Narada Falls Bridge	Narada Falls Bridge	1927	1991-03-13	Paradise; 46°46′31″N 121°44′43″W	Pierce	Reinforced concrete closed-spandrel arch
Norman Bridge		1950	1994-07-19	North Bend; 47°30′58″N 121°46′5″W	King	Demolished in 2008
North 21st Street Bridge	North 21st Street Bridge	1910, 1911	1982-07-16	Tacoma; 47°16′3″N 122°28′11″W	Pierce	Reinforced concrete rigid frame
North 23rd Street Bridge	North 23rd Street Bridge	1909, 1910	1982-07-16	Tacoma; 47°16′40″N 122°28′14″W	Pierce	Reinforced concrete rigid frame
North Hamma Hamma River Bridge	North Hamma Hamma River Bridge	1924	1982-07-16	Eldon; 47°32′23″N 123°2′33″W	Mason	Reinforced concrete through arch
Nutty Narrows Bridge	Nutty Narrows Bridge	1963	2014-08-18	Longview; 46°8′29″N 122°56′26″W	Cowlitz	Pseudo-suspension pipe squirrel bridge
Orient Bridge	Orient Bridge	1909	1982-07-16	Orient; 48°51′59″N 118°11′52″W	Stevens	Pin-connected Parker truss
Patton Bridge		1950	1995-05-24	Auburn; 47°17′18″N 122°9′34″W	King	Reinforced concrete box girder
Penstock Bridge		ca. 1909	1982-07-16	Leavenworth; 47°35′17″N 120°42′28″W	Chelan	Baltimore truss
Purdy Bridge	Purdy Bridge	1936	1982-07-16	Purdy; 47°23′35″N 122°37′38″W	Pierce	Reinforced concrete box girder
Ravenna Park Bridge	Ravenna Park Bridge	1913, 1914	1982-07-16	Seattle; 47°40′19″N 122°18′21″W	King	Steel hinged arch
Red Mountain Railroad Bridge		1896	1982-07-16	Northport; 48°58′3″N 117°48′53″W	Stevens	Timber Howe truss
Rock Island Railroad Bridge		1892, 1893	1975-07-30	Rock Island; 47°22′2″N 120°9′9″W	Chelan, Douglas	Pennsylvania truss
Rosalia Railroad Bridge	Rosalia Railroad Bridge	1915	1982-07-16	Rosalia; 47°13′15″N 117°21′24″W	Whitman	Reinforced concrete open-spandrel arch
Schmitz Park Bridge	Schmitz Park Bridge	1935, 1936	1982-07-16	Seattle; 47°34′38″N 122°24′8″W	King	Reinforced concrete rigid frame
Snake River Bridge		1927, 1968	1982-07-16	Lyons Ferry; 46°35′28″N 118°13′28″W	Columbia	Cantilever through truss
South Hamma Hamma River Bridge	South Hamma Hamma River Bridge	1924	1982-07-16	Eldon; 47°32′11″N 123°2′28″W	Mason	Reinforced concrete through arch
South Puyallup River Bridge	South Puyallup River Bridge	1931	1991-03-13	Nisqually Entrance; 46°48′29″N 121°53′26″W	Pierce	Reinforced concrete closed-spandrel arch
Spokane River Bridge at Fort Spokane	Spokane river Bridge at Fort Spokane	1941	1995-03-28	Hunters; 47°54′30″N 118°18′59″W	Lincoln	Cantilever through truss
Spokane River Bridge at Long Lake Dam	Spokane River Bridge at Long Lake Dam	1949	1995-05-24	Rearden; 47°50′19″N 117°51′5″W	Lincoln, Stevens	Reinforced concrete open-spandrel arch
St. Andrews Creek Bridge	St. Andrews Creek Bridge	1931	1991-03-13	Nisqually Entrance; 46°50′10″N 121°54′15″W	Pierce	Reinforced concrete closed-spandrel arch
Sunset Boulevard Bridge	Sunset Boulevard Bridge	1911	1982-07-16	Spokane; 47°39′0″N 117°26′48″W	Spokane	Reinforced concrete open-spandrel arch
Tacoma Narrows Bridge Ruins (Galloping Gertie)	Tacoma Narrows Bridge Ruins	1940	1992-08-31	Tacoma	Pierce	Suspension
Toppenish–Zillah Bridge		1947	1995-05-24	Toppenish; 46°23′59″N 120°16′49″W	Yakima	Reinforced concrete box girder
University Bridge		1915, 1919	1982-07-16	Seattle; 47°39′12″N 122°19′8″W	King	Simple trunnion bascule (double leaf)
Vance Creek Bridge		1929	1982-07-16	Shelton; 47°20′6″N 123°19′10″W	Mason	Steel arch
Interstate Bridge (Vancouver-Portland Bridge)		1915–1917	1982-07-16	Vancouver; 45°37′22″N 122°40′17″W	Clark	Vertical-lift bridge
Washington Street Bridge	Washington Street Bridge	1908	1982-07-16	Spokane; 47°39′48″N 117°25′1″W	Spokane	Reinforced concrete closed-spandrel arch
West Monitor Bridge		1907	1982-07-16	Monitor; 47°30′4″N 120°25′28″W	Chelan	Pin-connected Pratt truss
White River Bridge	White River Bridge	1929	1991-03-13	White River Entrance; 46°53′53″N 121°37′4″W	Pierce	Reinforced concrete closed-spandrel arch
Winnifred Street Bridge		1941	1995-03-28	Ruston; 47°17′52″N 122°30′43″W	Pierce	Reinforced concrete box girder
Yale Bridge	Yale Bridge	1932	1982-07-16	Yale; 45°57′40″N 122°22′18″W	Clark	Suspension
"Jack Knife" Bridge		1913, 1914	removed 1990-07-16	Everett	Snohomish	Strauss bascule
Chow Chow Bridge		1952	removed 1988-04-25	Taholah	Grays Harbor	Cable-stayed
Doty Bridge		1924–1926	removed 1990-07-16	Doty	Lewis	Timber Howe truss
Lacey V. Murrow Floating Bridge	Lacey V. Murrow Bridge construction	1940	removed 1991-03-11	Seattle	King	Pontoon
McClure Bridge	McClure Bridge	1912	removed 1990-07-16	Palouse	Whitman	Timber Pratt truss
North 4th and Dock Street Bridge			removed 1984-03-13	Tacoma	Pierce	Pratt truss
Pasco–Kennewick Bridge		1922	removed 1990-07-16	Pasco	Franklin	Cantilever through truss
Prosser Steel Bridge		1911	removed 1990-07-16	Prosser	Benton	
Weyerhaeuser Pe Ell Bridge		1934	removed 1990-07-16	Pe Ell	Lewis	Timber Howe truss, pony truss
Winslow Railroad Bridge		1916, 1917	removed 1999-12-15	Colville	Stevens	Howe truss
Wishkah River Bridge		1915	removed 1990-07-16	Greenwood	Grays Harbor	Warren through truss

== See also ==
- List of bridges documented by the Historic American Engineering Record in Washington (state)
- List of bridges in Washington
