= Cliff walk =

A Cliff Walk is a walkway or trail which follows close to the edge or foot of a cliff or headland. Numerous walkways around the world have "Cliff Walk" as part of their names:

- Newport Cliff Walk, Rhode Island, United States
- Devil's Corner Cliff Walk in Washington State, United States
- Diamond Harbour Cliff Walk, South Island, New Zealand
- Federation Cliff Walk, Sydney, Australia
- Langdon Cliff Walk, Kent, England
- Capilano Cliffwalk, North Vancouver, British Columbia, Canada

Cliff Walk may also refer to a 1999 comedy film of that title by Robert Cuccioli.
