= Regrading in Seattle =

Infrastructure projects in Seattle

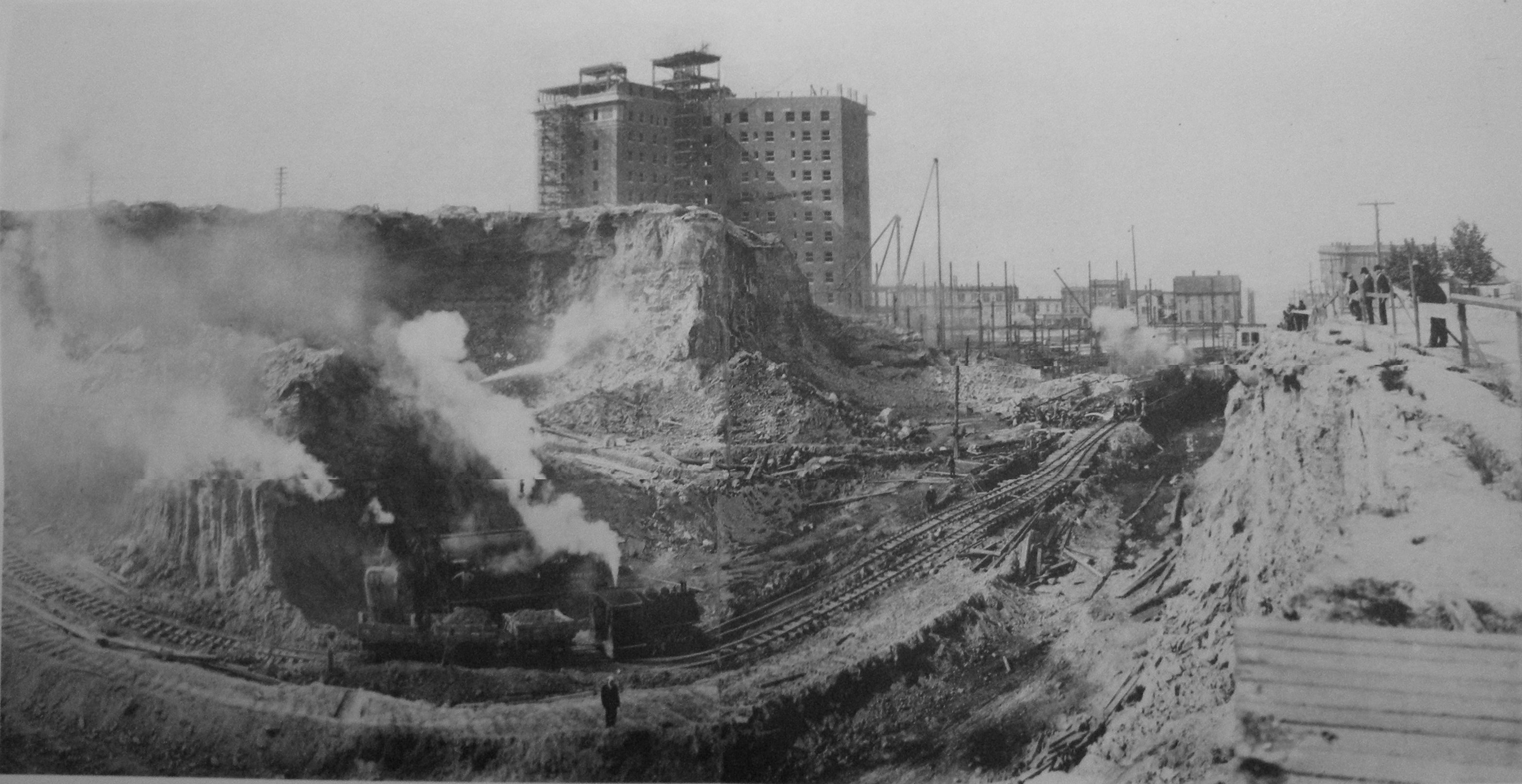
A regrade in progress circa 1907. The building under construction is the New Washington Hotel, now the Josephinium at the corner of Second and Stewart.

The topography of central Seattle was radically altered by a series of regrades in the late 19th century and into the 20th. This might have been the largest such alteration of urban terrain at the time.

The heart of Seattle is on an isthmus between the city's chief harbor—the saltwater Elliott Bay (an inlet of Puget Sound)—and the fresh water of Lake Washington. Capitol Hill, First Hill, and Beacon Hill collectively constitute a ridge along this isthmus (see Seven hills of Seattle). In addition, at the time the city was founded, the steep Denny Hill stood in the area now known as Belltown or the Denny Regrade.

When European settlers first came to Seattle in the early 1850s, the tides of Elliott Bay lapped at the base of Beacon Hill. The original location of the settlement that became Seattle—today's Pioneer Square—was a low-lying island. A series of regrades leveled paths for roads, demolished Denny Hill, and turned much of Jackson Hill (a remnant of which remains along Main Street in the International District) into a near-canyon between First and Beacon Hills. The roughly 50,000,000 short tons (45,400,000 t) of earth from these 60 regrades provided landfill for the city's waterfront and the industrial/commercial neighborhood now known as SoDo, and built Harbor Island, at the time the largest man-made island in the world.

== Early years ==
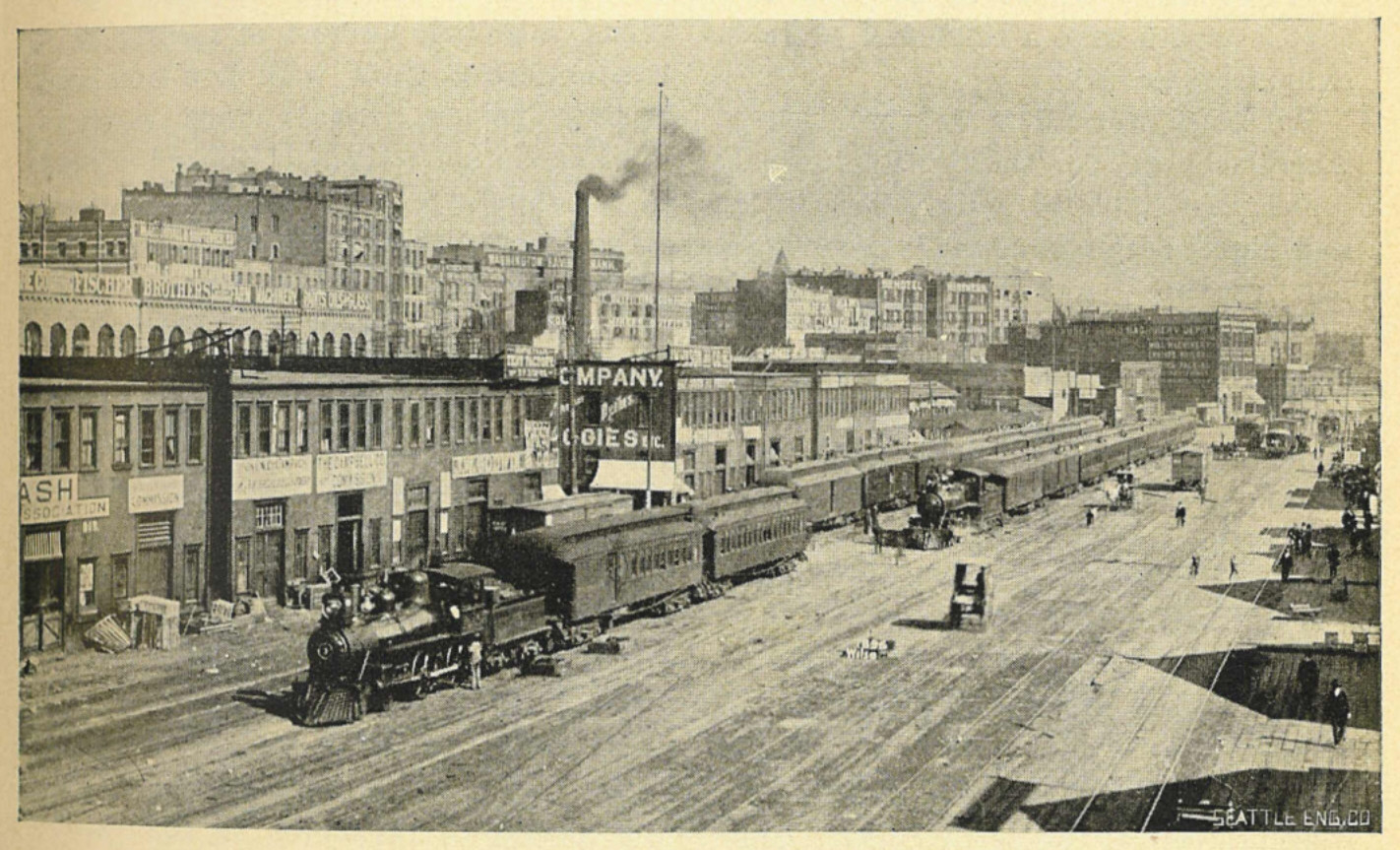
Railroad Avenue, today's Alaskan Way, depicted here in 1900, was built on fill from the early regrades. To the right in this picture, casting shadows, are the wharves of the Central Waterfront.

Seattle's first 58 regrades "consisted largely of cutting the tops off high places and dumping the dirt into low places and onto the beach". The most dramatic result of this was along that former beach, filling the land that constitutes today's Central Waterfront. Today's Western Avenue and Alaskan Way lie on this landfill.

These informal regrades came to an end around 1900; later regrades typically required changes to areas that had already undergone some development. City engineer R.H. Thomson established his prestige in 1900. He successfully provided the city with ample fresh water by running a pipeline from the Cedar River. He then undertook to level the extreme hills that rose south and north of the bustling city center. A central concern of Thomson's work in Seattle was to connect disparate parts of the city together, allowing easier movement. Thomson was quoted as saying that the city had developed the land "with but little regard as to whether the streets could ever be used or not, the main idea being, apparently, to sell the lots."

== Cutting through Beacon Hill ==
The first, unsuccessful, attempt to pierce the Capitol Hill – First Hill – Beacon Hill ridge came at the end of this era of informal regrades. In 1895, former territorial governor Eugene Semple (1840–1908) proposed several ambitious plans to reengineer Seattle. One of these, which he undertook in 1901, was to dig a canal from Elliott Bay to Lake Washington by cutting through Beacon Hill in roughly the area of Spokane Street, sluicing earth into the tide flats. His effort was defeated by unstable soils, which caused several cave-ins, and by the legal and political maneuvering of Judge Thomas Burke and others aligned with the Great Northern Railway. The Lake Washington Ship Canal ultimately followed the route north of downtown favored by Burke, taking advantage of existing lakes and bays. Semple left behind a canyon that is now used by the Spokane Street interchange on Interstate 5.

Thomson resumed the work of cutting through Beacon Hill to connect central Seattle to the Rainier Valley, the first of his major regrades, but he made his cut farther north. The Jackson Regrade between 1907 and 1910 slashed 85 feet (25.9 m) from the hill, requiring the demolition of the public South School and the original Holy Names Academy but providing fill for the tide flats below Beacon Hill that stretched south from King Street, filling in today's SoDo. Jackson Street became a slow slope upward from Elliott Bay in the west to the Central District east of the Capitol Hill – First Hill – Beacon Hill ridge.

Shortly afterward, just south of the Jackson Regrade, the Dearborn Street Regrade made an even deeper cut through the ridge. In one place, the level of the land was lowered by 108 feet (32.9 m); 1.6 million cubic yards (1,223,288 m^{3}) of earth were moved. As with Semple's abandoned canal, there were several landslides, and many homes were destroyed that were not originally planned to be removed.

The resulting gap at Dearborn Street was deep enough to require a bridge running roughly north-south. Originally known as the 12th Avenue South Bridge and now known as the Jose P. Rizal Bridge, it is now on the National Register of Historic Places.

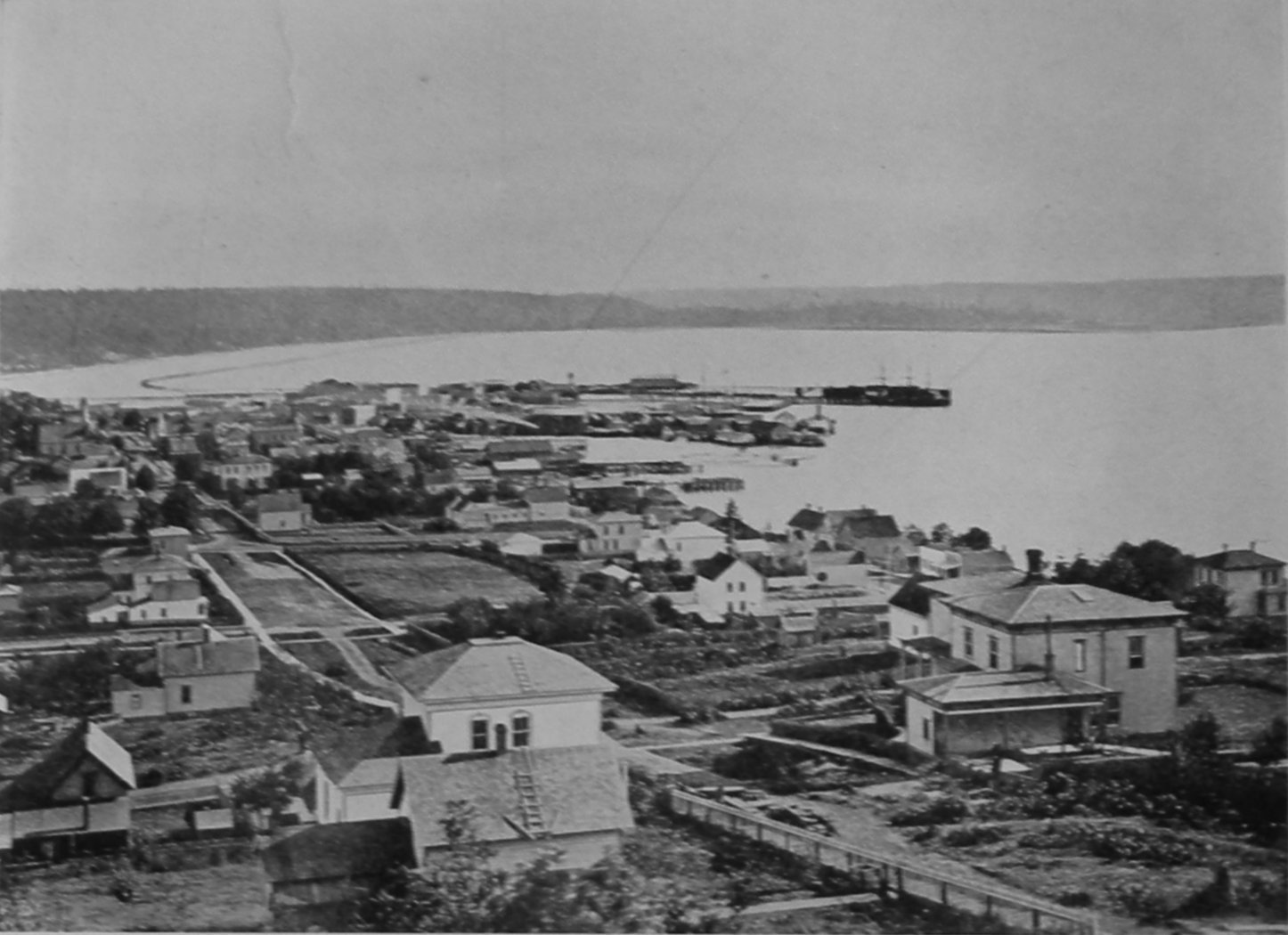
Looking south from Pine Street on the south slope of Denny Hill, 1880. The wide bay at the foot of Beacon Hill is now the location of the SoDo neighborhood.

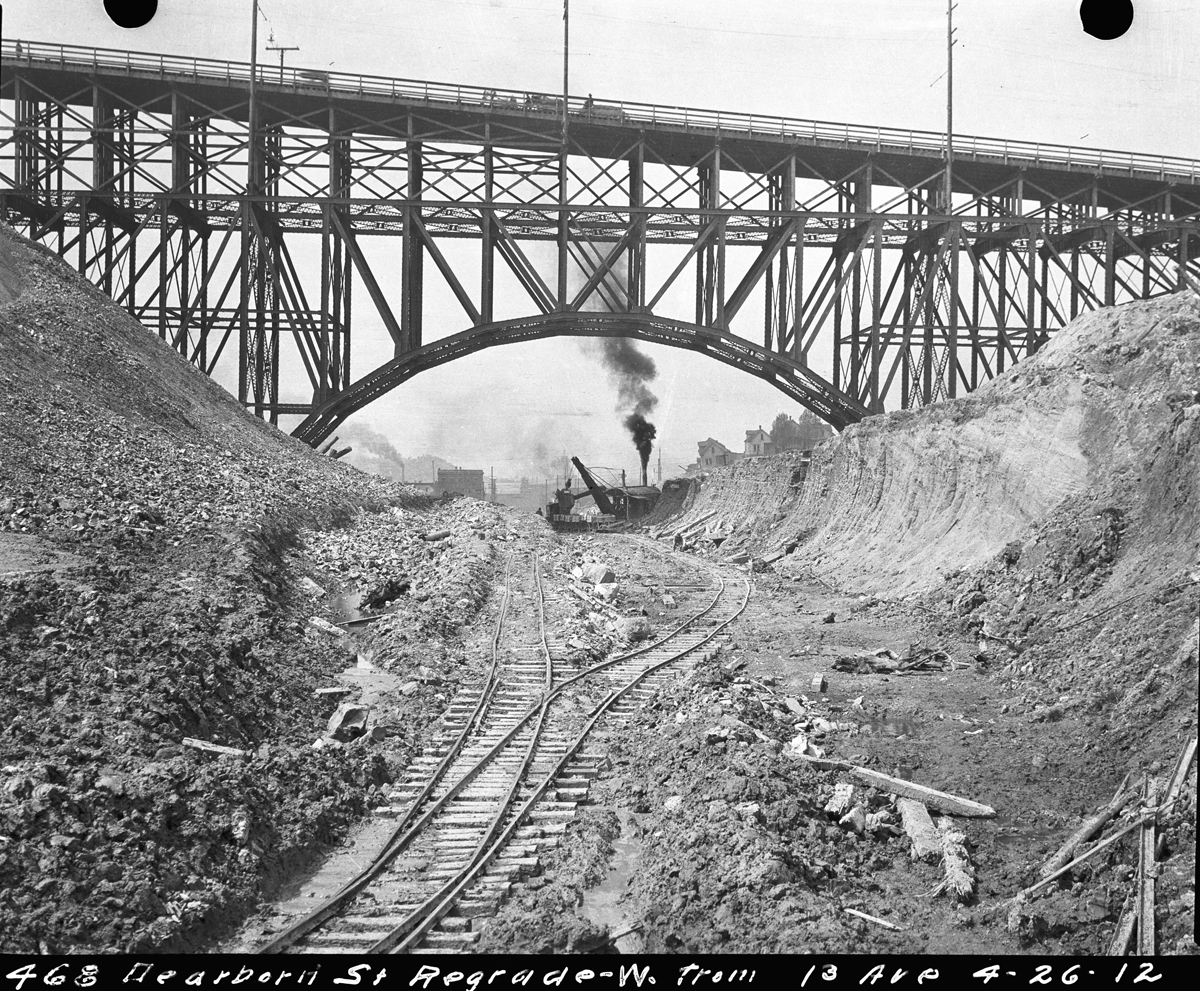
The Dearborn Regrade in progress, 1912. Looking west, towards the 12th Avenue South Bridge/Jose P. Rizal Bridge, constructed the previous year.

== Denny Regrade ==
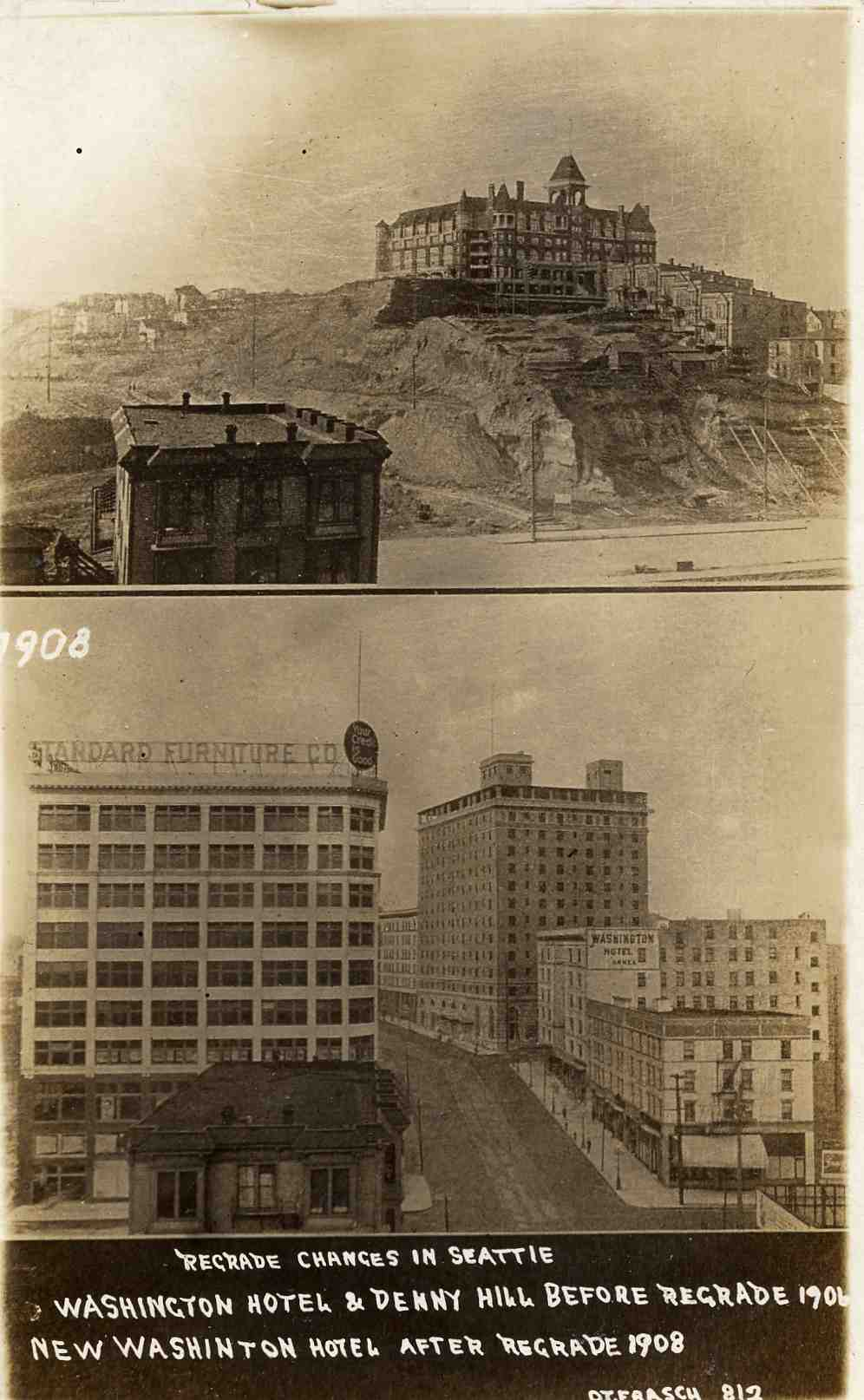
A postcard shows the Washington Hotel atop Denny Hill before Denny Regrade No. 1 and the New Washington Hotel (the dark building in the lower picture, now the Josephinum) built on the newly leveled land.

The Denny Regrade began before the Jackson and Dearborn Regrades, but the last stage was not completed until decades later. Before regrading, the much-admired Denny School and the upmarket Washington Hotel stood atop the hill, along with numerous residential buildings. The two-storey high Denny School was found on Battery Street, between Fifth and Sixth Avenues, and was considered "handsome in the extreme."

City engineer R.H. Thomson considered Denny Hill to be the biggest impediment to traveling to other places in the city. Although in retrospect it is referred to as the Denny Regrade (and the name has become the name of a neighborhood), there were, in fact, several separate regrades of the former Denny Hill, beginning with private-sector efforts. Around 1900, property owners along relatively low-lying First Avenue took it upon themselves to cut through from Pike Street to Cedar Street. A similar cut (but initiated by the City) lowered Second Avenue in 1904; around the same time, the south part of the hill was shaved off as Pike and Pine Streets were regraded between Second and Fifth Avenues.

The more dramatic Denny Regrade No. 1 (1908–1911) sluiced away the entire half of the hill closest to the waterfront, about 27 city blocks extending from Pine Street to Cedar Street and from Second to Fifth Avenues. 20,000,000 US gallons (75,708 m^{3}) of water a day were pumped from Lake Union, to be aimed at the hill as jets of water, then run through tunnels to Elliott Bay.

Much of the motivation for the regrade had been to increase land values, but the area opened up—the heart of today's Belltown—was left as a strip cut off from much of the rest of the city by the remaining eastern half of the hill, whose western face offered no route of approach. Meanwhile, property-owners and investors hesitated to build on the remaining portion of the hill, because they considered it likely that their buildings would eventually be destroyed in the next phase of the regrading process, which was now well under way.

The result was Denny Regrade No. 2, begun in February 1929 and lasting 22 months. This time, the technology was power shovels rather than sluicing, with earth carried to the waterfront by conveyor belts, then placed on specially designed scows and dumped in deep water. The scows were intentionally designed to capsize in a controlled manner. They were symmetrical top-to-bottom and side to side; a seacock could be opened to fill one side with water. In three minutes it would capsize, dump its load, bob up, empty the tank, and right itself.

One of the buildings demolished in Denny Regrade No. 2 was the Denny School on Battery Street between 5th and 6th Avenues. Opened in 1884, it had been described as "an architectural jewel... the finest schoolhouse on the West Coast".

While the 38 blocks were being regraded, the country entered the Great Depression, radically reducing the demand for land. Most of the new lots sat vacant into the 1940s; the area (especially east of Sixth Avenue) remained a gray zone into the early 21st century, when it finally began to gain an urban or suburban identity as the west edge of the new growth of South Lake Union.

Thomas Burke questioned the Denny Hill regrade, stating to a reporter at the closing party of the Washington Hotel that "from a commercial point of view, and certainly from an aesthetic one, it would have been much better to have saved Denny Hill by carrying Third Avenue under it, thus obtaining the desired result, while preserving in all aspects the natural beauty that means so much to any city."

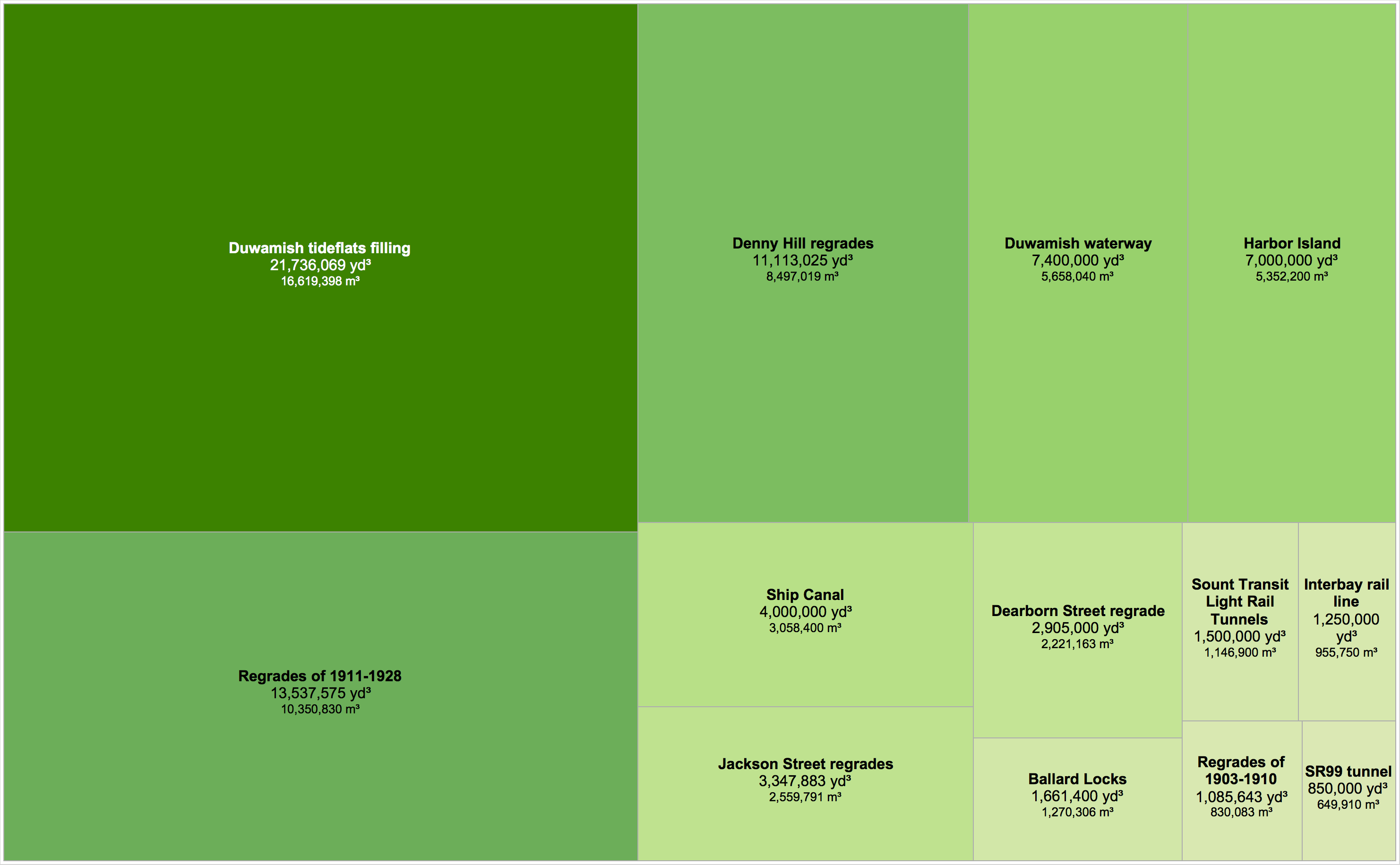
Treemap comparing the volume of earth moved by the megaprojects that transformed the landscape in and around Seattle. The Denny and other regrades moved a combined total of more than 35 million cubic yards of earth. Creating Harbor Island involved 7 million cubic yards, while the Ballard Locks project moved 1.6 million, twice that of the Alaskan Way Viaduct replacement tunnel. Straightening the Duwamish River and filling its tideflats was the largest single project, at nearly 22 million cubic yards.

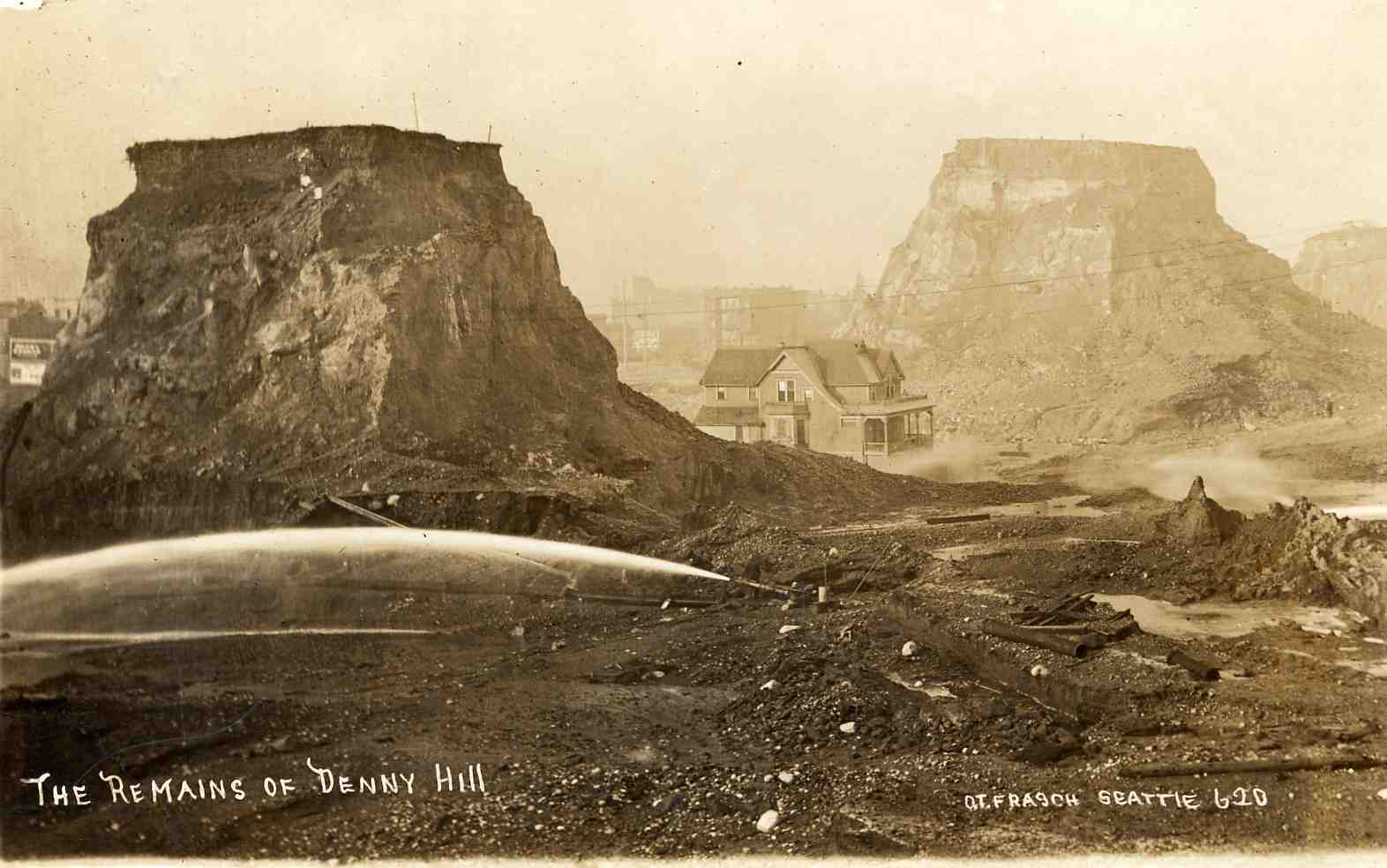
Denny Regrade No. 1 in progress, circa 1910

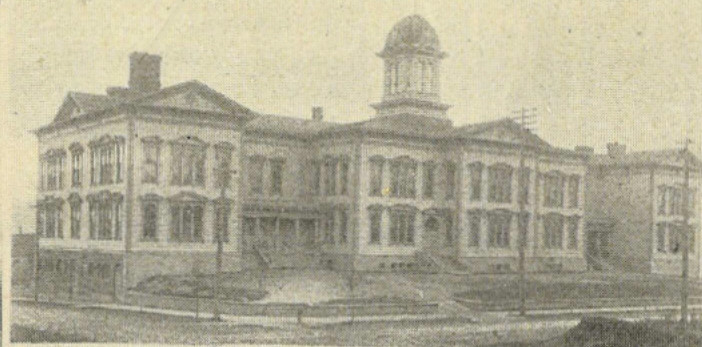
The 1884 Denny School (depicted here in 1900) on Battery Street between Fifth & Sixth Avenues was demolished in 1928, one of many major buildings demolished as part of Denny Regrade No. 2.
