= West Monitor Bridge =

- U.S. National Register of Historic Places
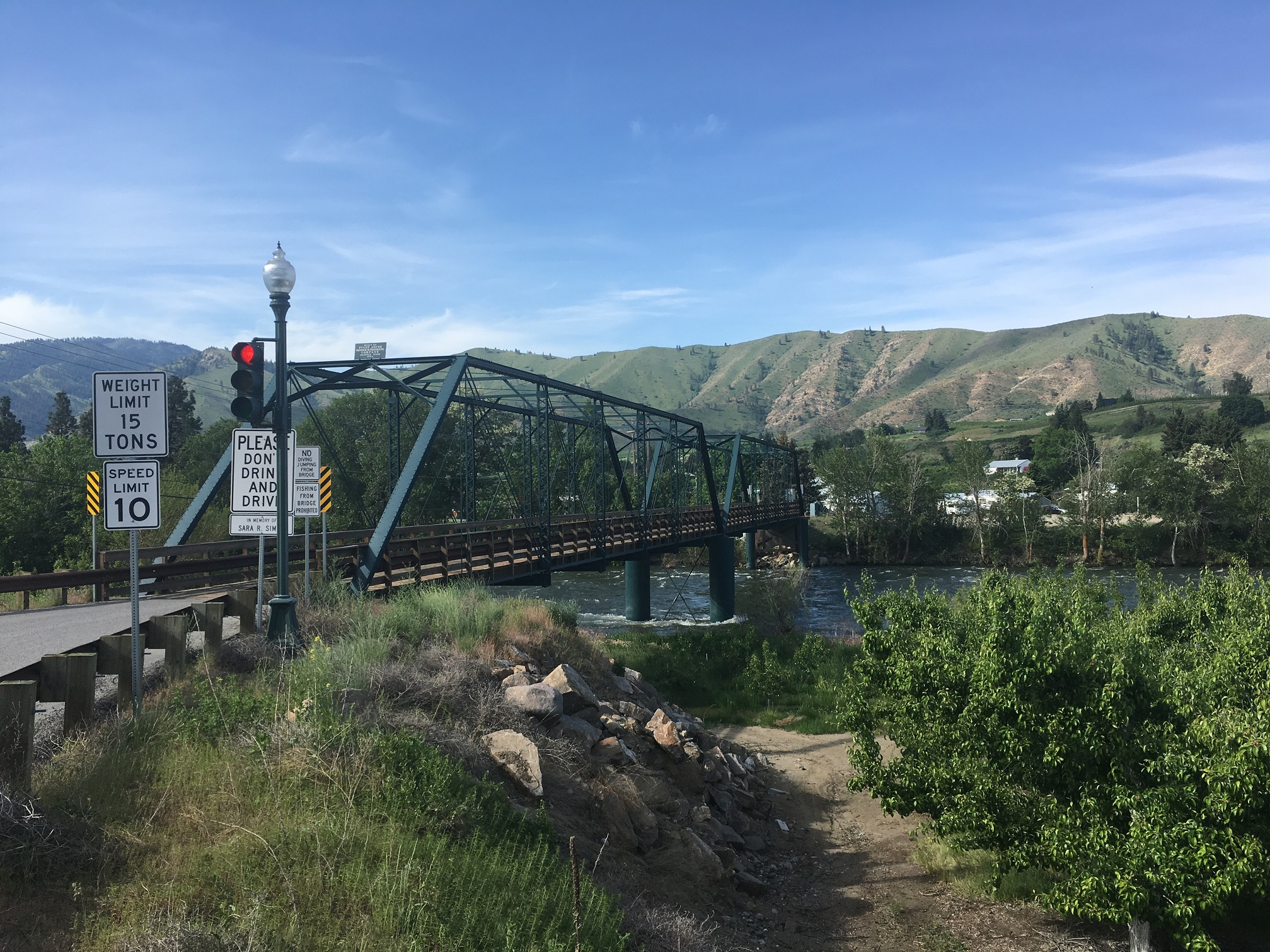
- West Monitor Bridge View looking southwest at the northern end of the one-lane span.

- Location within Washington (state)
- Nearest city: Monitor, Washington
- Coordinates: 47°30′04″N 120°25′28″W
- Area: less than one acre
- Built: 1907
- Built by: Puget Sound Bridge & Dredging Co.
- Architectural style: pinconnected Pratt truss br.
- MPS: Historic Bridges/Tunnels in Washington State TR
- NRHP reference No.: 82004197
- Added to NRHP: July 16, 1982

The West Monitor Bridge is representative of a common bridge type. It's riveted steel cylinder piers supporting the truss remain intact. The Puget Sound Bridge and Dredging Company built this two-span steel pinconnected Pratt truss in 1907. The bridge is 320 feet (98 m) long and 16 feet (4.9 m) wide. It uses two 140 feet (43 m) steel spans over the river with a 20 feet (6.1 m) timber trestle on each bank. The trusses have seven 20 feet (6.1 m) panels, resting on concrete filled riveted steel cylinder piers. In the early 20th century, this was an economical design. The bridge supports a timber deck which is 16 feet (4.9 m) wide, curb to curb.
