= Grant Street Bridge =

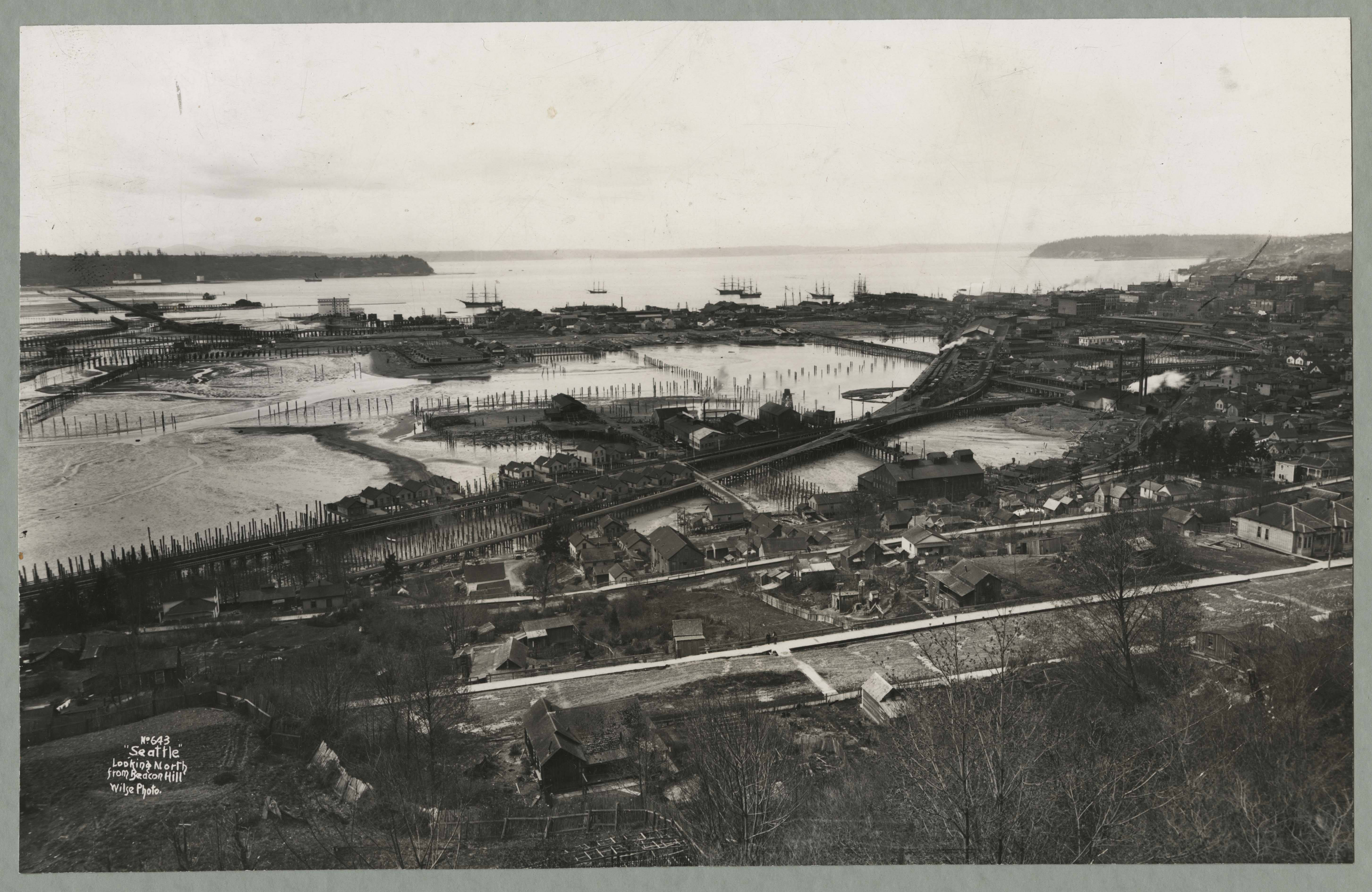
- View from north west Beacon Hill, ca. 1900
- Coordinates: 47.5418°N 122.3035°W
- Carries: Primary thoroughfare from between Seattle and South Seattle
- Crosses: Duwamish River and Elliott Bay mudflats
- Locale: Seattle, Washington

Characteristics
- Design: Timber-pile bridge

The Grant Street Bridge was a main thoroughfare in Seattle, Washington, constructed in 1886. The bridge was built on timber piles, or a pier, as the city grew south over the mudflats of Elliott Bay's shore and the Duwamish River estuary. The structure was expansive and, based on various accounts from the time, stretched between half to a full mile long. The city eventually filled in the tideflats to create Seattle Boulevard, the arterial later called Airport Way.
