= North 21st Street Bridge =

- U.S. National Register of Historic Places
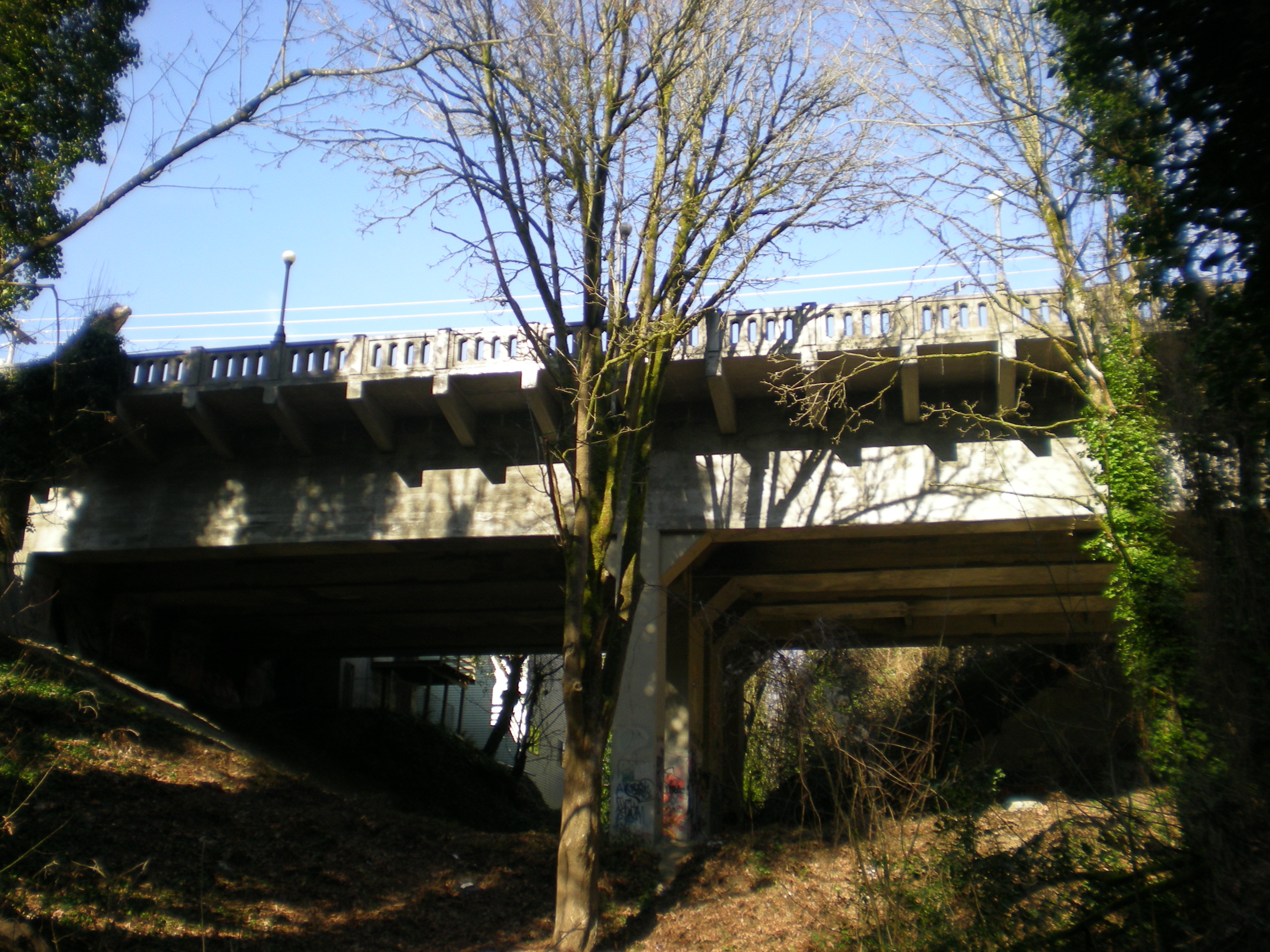

- Location within Washington (state) Location within the United States
- Location: Spans Buckley Gulch and North Fife and Oakes streets, Tacoma, Washington
- Coordinates: 47°16′3″N 122°28′11″W
- Area: Less than one acre
- Built: 1910
- Built by: Creelman, Putnam & Healy
- Architect: Waddell & Harrington
- Architectural style: Rigid-frame girder bridge
- MPS: Historic Bridges/Tunnels in Washington State TR
- NRHP reference No.: 82004280
- Added to NRHP: July 16, 1982

The North 21st Street Bridge in Tacoma, Washington was built in 1910. It was designed by engineers Waddell & Harrington and is a continuous concrete rigid-frame girder bridge. It is significant as one of the very earliest examples of its type. It was built "almost simultaneously" with the 950-foot (290 m) Asylum Avenue Aqueduct in Knoxville, Tennessee, which was documented by Carl W. Condit to be the first continuous concrete girder bridge to be built.

It has three 60 feet (18 m) reinforced concrete spans with four continuous girders. Its spans are supported by reinforced concrete columns and abutments. The bridge has "massive and over-designed" slabs (9 feet (2.7 m) deep) and beams from 4 to 7 feet (1.2 to 2.1 m) wide, from 9 to 11 feet (2.7 to 3.4 m) deep. It is 48 feet (15 m) wide to accommodate trolley tracks in the middle.

The bridge was listed on the National Register of Historic Places in 1982.

== See also ==
- List of bridges documented by the Historic American Engineering Record in Washington (state)
- List of bridges on the National Register of Historic Places in Washington (state)
- North 23rd Street Bridge, similar, nearby, narrower, longer, also designed by Waddell & Harrington, and also NRHP-listed
