= Orient Bridge =

- U.S. National Register of Historic Places
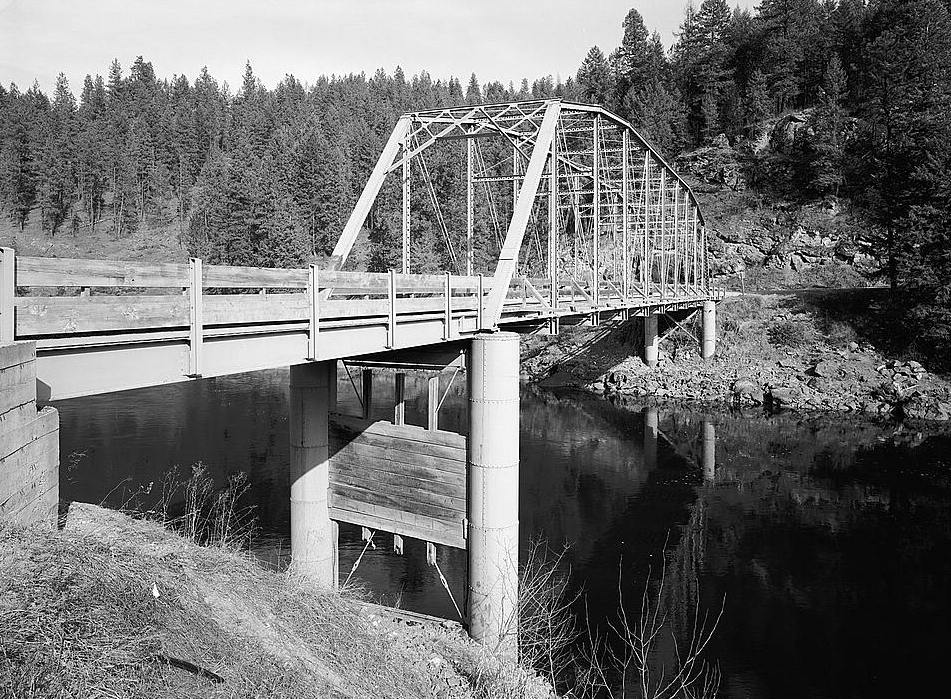

- Location within Washington (state) Location within the United States
- Location: Richardson Road, spanning Kettle River, Orient, Washington
- Coordinates: 48°51′59″N 118°11′52″W
- Area: less than one acre
- Built: 1909
- Built by: C. G. Sheely Contracting Co.
- Architect: W. M. Manning
- Architectural style: Pin-connected Parker steel truss
- MPS: Historic Bridges/Tunnels in Washington State TR
- NRHP reference No.: 82004297
- Added to NRHP: July 16, 1982

The Orient Bridge, which spans the Kettle River between Ferry County, Washington and Stevens County, Washington, was built in 1909. It was listed on the National Register of Historic Places.

It brings Richardson Road across the river. It includes a 180-foot-long (55 m) pin-connected steel Parker truss span, and is 240 feet (73 m) long in total, including approach spans.

The old bridge was apparently replaced by a new bridge in 1993.

== See also ==
- List of bridges documented by the Historic American Engineering Record in Washington (state)
- List of bridges on the National Register of Historic Places in Washington (state)
