= Barstow Bridge =

- U.S. National Register of Historic Places
- Location within Washington (state) Location within the United States
- map with the location of the Barstow Bridge
- Nearest city: Kettle Falls, Washington
- Coordinates: 48°47′04″N 118°07′28″W
- Area: less than one acre
- Built: 1947
- Built by: U.S. War Assets Administration
- Architectural style: Pratt Truss
- MPS: Bridges of Washington State MPS
- NRHP reference No.: 95000263
- Added to NRHP: March 30, 1995

The Barstow Bridge was a historic Pratt pony truss bridge, at US 395 and Co. Rd. 4061, over the Kettle River near Kettle Falls, Washington. It spanned between Ferry County, Washington and Stevens County, Washington.

It was a pre-fabricated steel bridge that was a surplus World War II bridge. It was bought from the U.S. War Assets Administration in 1946 and was installed near the unincorporated community of Barstow in 1947.

The historic bridge was removed and replaced in 2010.
