= Rosalia Railroad Bridge =

- U.S. National Register of Historic Places
- Location within Washington (state)
- Location: crosses Washington State Route 271
- Nearest city: Rosalia, Washington
- Coordinates: 47°13′20″N 117°21′47″W
- Built: 1915
- Architectural style: concrete arch
- MPS: Historic Bridges/Tunnels in Washington State TR
- NRHP reference No.: 82004310
- Added to NRHP: July 16, 1982

The Rosalia Railroad Bridge was built by the Chicago, Milwaukee, St. Paul and Pacific Railroad (also known as the Milwaukee Road) in 1915 to replace an earlier timber trestle. The bridge was designed as a concrete arch, unusual for a railroad bridge, because it crosses the Northern Pacific Railroad tracks (a rival railroad), a state highway, and is visible from Steptoe Battlefield State Park. The railroad wanted an impressive-looking bridge. The viaduct consists of two spans, separated by an embankment. East of the 334-foot (102 m) embankment there is a 114-foot (35 m) span crossing over the Northern Pacific tracks. To the west is a 502-foot (153 m) span that crosses Pine Creek, railroad tracks, and the highway.

When the Milwaukee Road went bankrupt in the 1980s. the bridge and right-of-way were acquired by the State of Washington.

The bridge was listed in the National Register of Historic Places due to its design.

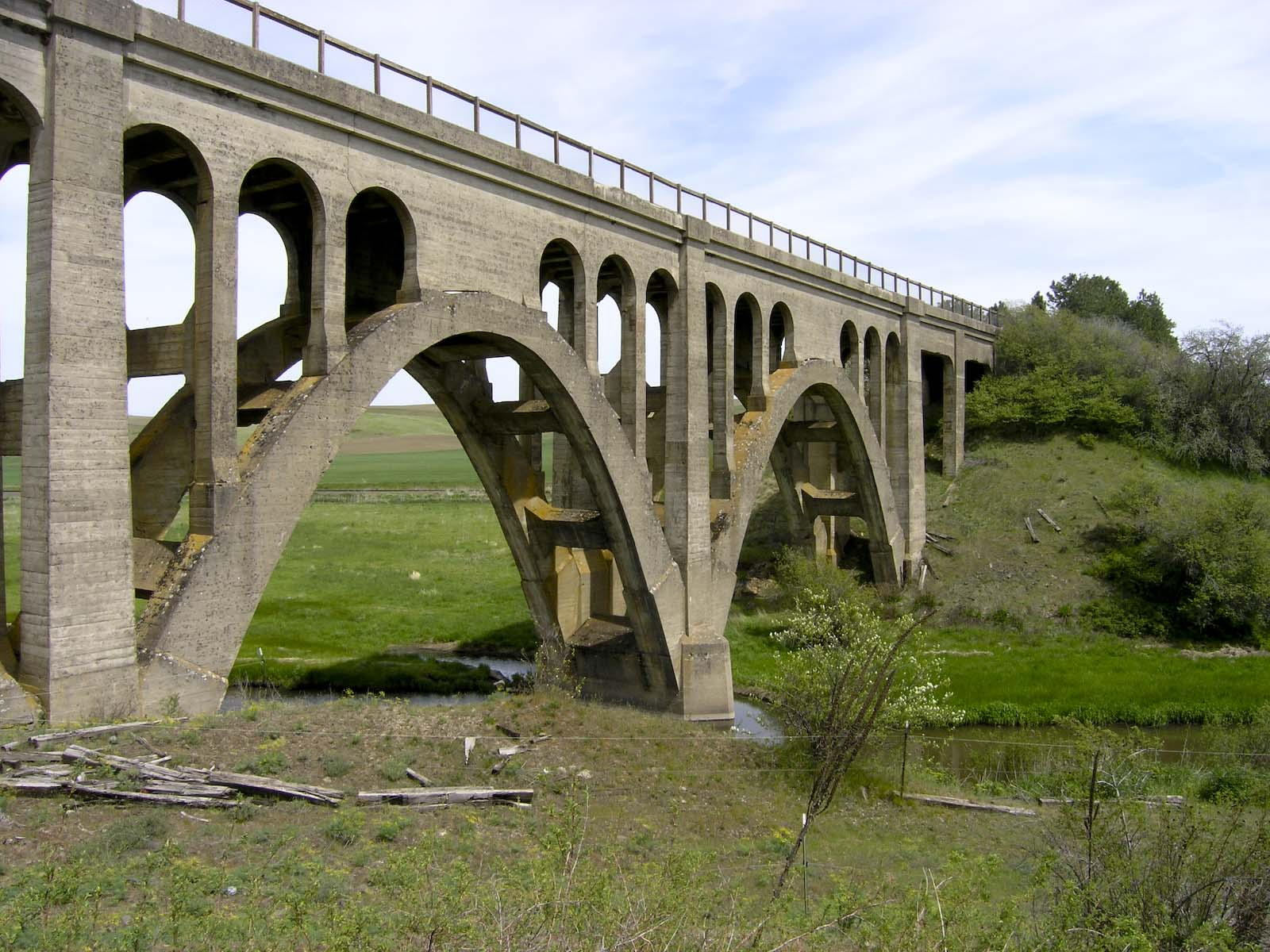
The western bridge, seen from the highway

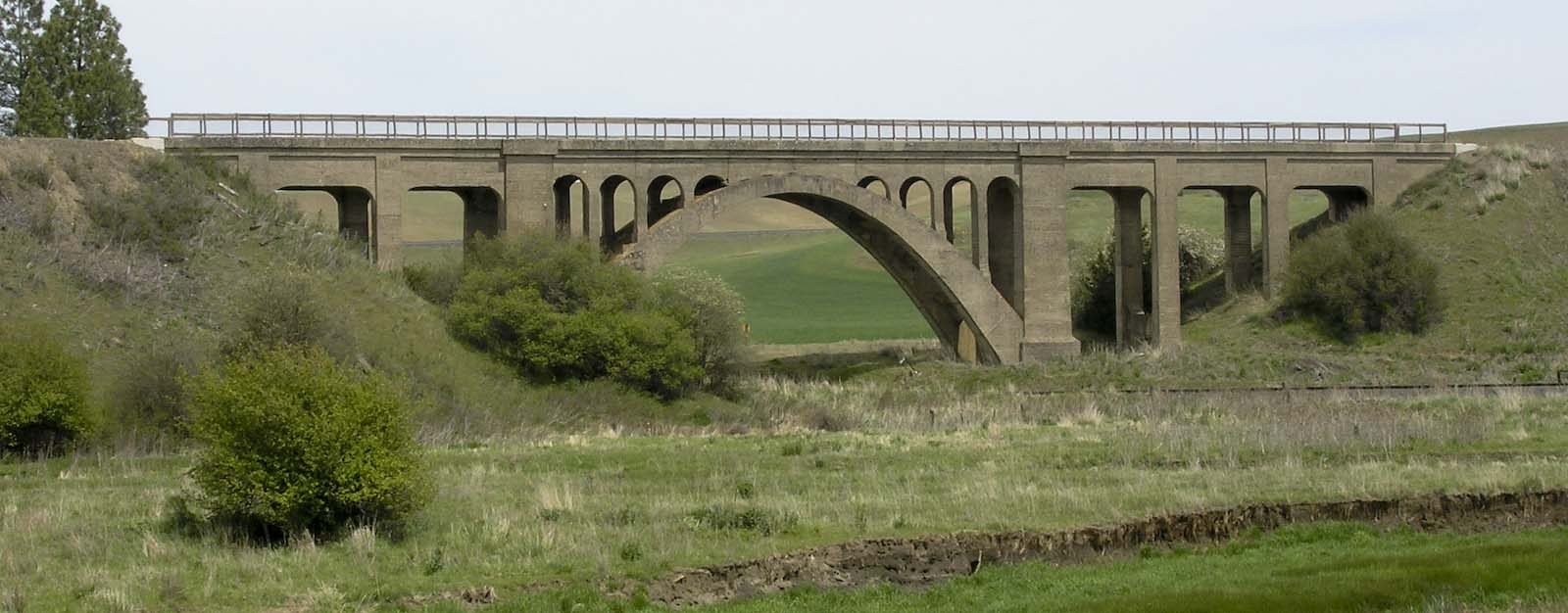
The eastern bridge, seen from the south
