= Winnifred Street Bridge =

- U.S. National Register of Historic Places
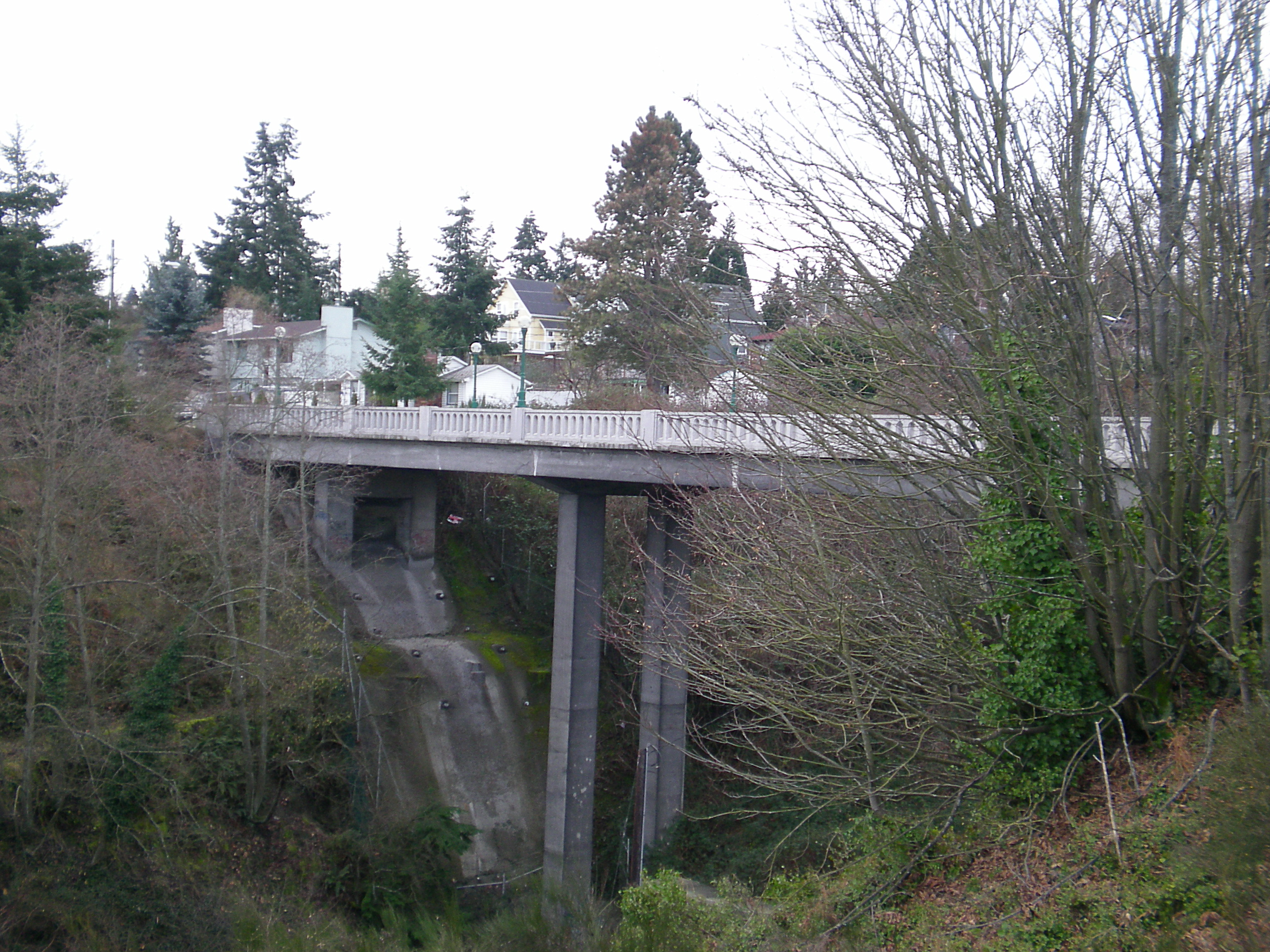

- Location within Washington (state)
- Nearest city: Ruston, Washington
- Coordinates: 47°17′51.91″N 122°30′43.44″W
- Built: 1941
- Architect: W. H. Witt, S. R. Gray
- MPS: Bridges of Washington State MPS
- NRHP reference No.: 95000259
- Added to NRHP: March 28, 1995

The Winnifred Street Bridge (also known as WSDOT Bridge No. 1130) is a concrete box girder bridge in Ruston, Washington. It was built in 1941 by S. R. Gray. The bridge has a 215-foot (66 m) deck, and sits 74 feet (23 m) above railroad tracks in a ravine.

After an inspection of the bridge, it was found to have structural deficiencies in its abutment wall, and was closed for repairs. The original guardrails were replaced, as well as the deck surface. In June 2003, the bridge reopened to traffic.

The bridge was added to the National Register of Historic Places in 1995.

== Sources ==
- Holstine, Craig E.; Hobbs, Richard (2005). Spanning Washington: Historic Highway Bridges of the Evergreen State. Washington State University Press. ISBN 978-0-87422-281-4.
