= North 23rd Street Bridge =

- U.S. National Register of Historic Places
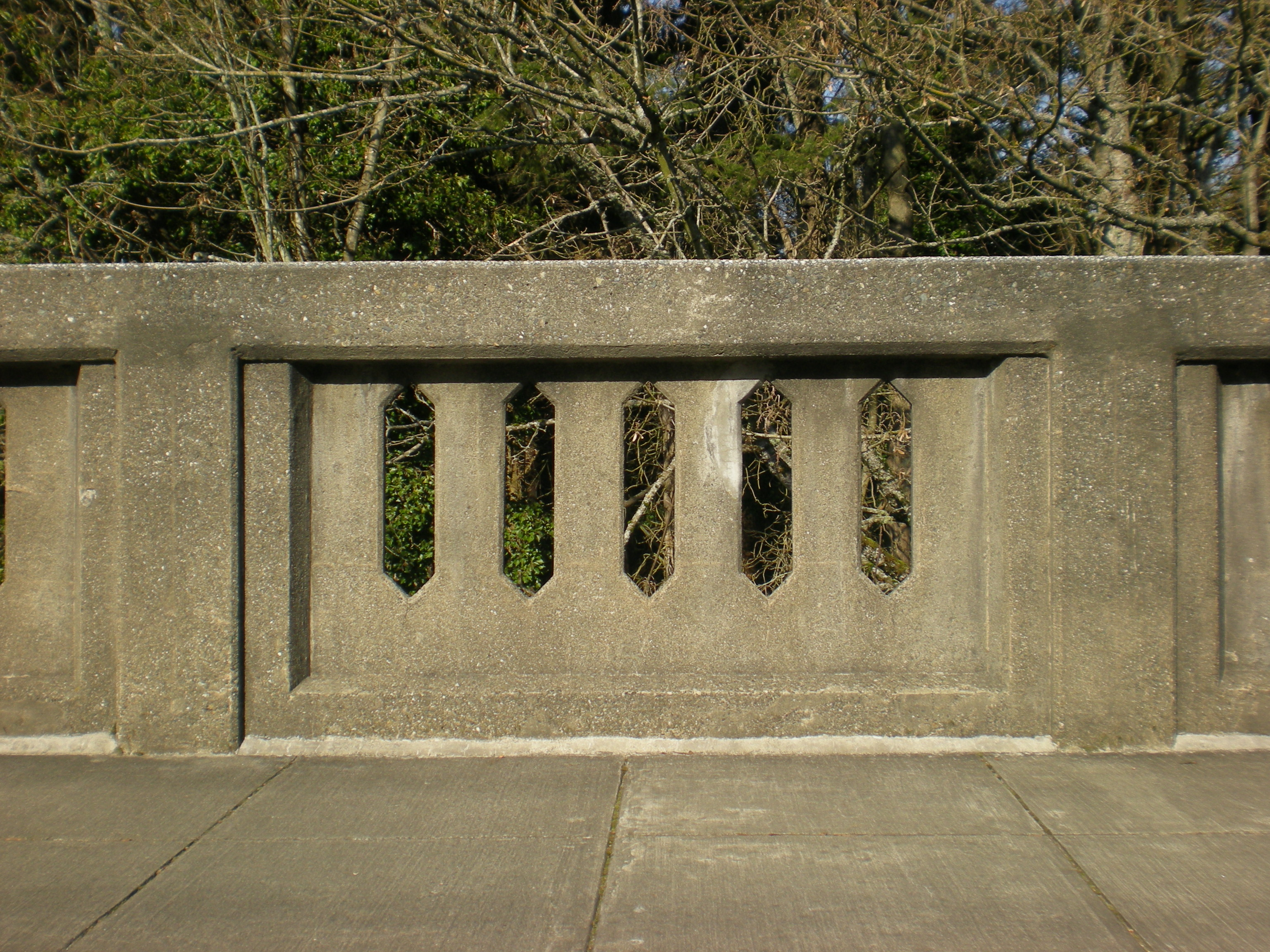

- Location within Washington (state) Location within the United States
- Location: Spans Buckley Gulch, N. Fife and Oakes, Tacoma, Washington
- Coordinates: 47°16′7.4″N 122°28′16″W
- Area: less than one acre
- Built: 1909
- Built by: Creelman, Putnam & Healy
- Architect: Waddell & Harrington
- Architectural style: Rigid-frame bridge
- MPS: Historic Bridges/Tunnels in Washington State TR
- NRHP reference No.: 82004281
- Added to NRHP: July 16, 1982

The North 23rd Street Bridge in Tacoma, Washington, United States, is a concrete rigid frame bridge that was designed by engineers Waddell & Harrington in 1909. It was built for the City of Tacoma by contractors Creelman, Putman, and Healy.

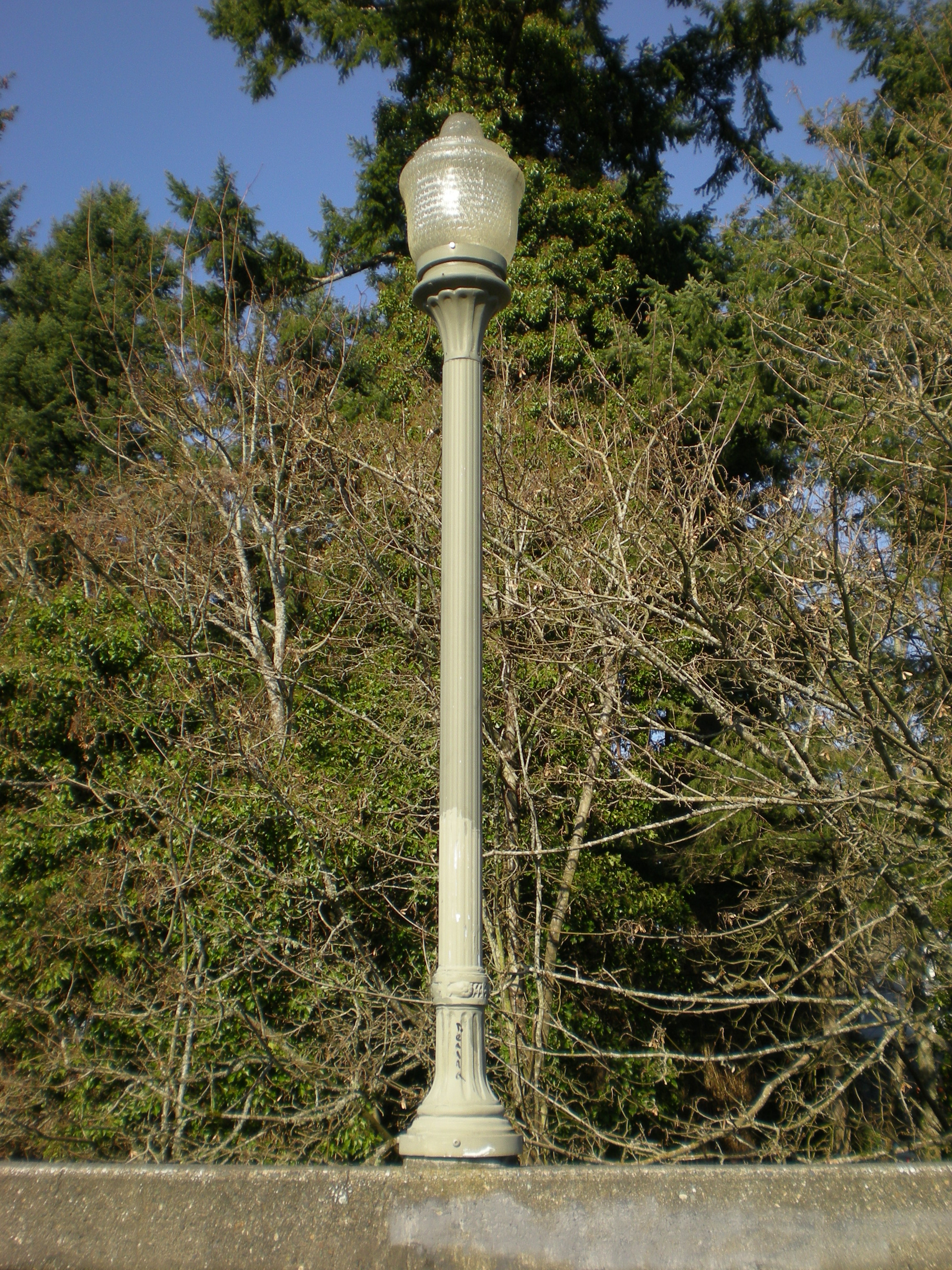
A lamp post on the bridge

It is significant as an early concrete rigid frame bridge. It has "massive, overdesigned concrete beams" that are "6 feet wide at the center, and 13 feet at the ends". The beams are "8 feet deep at the center, and 12 feet deep at the ends." It is 312 feet (95 m) long and 30 feet (9.1 m) wide.

It was listed on the National Register of Historic Places in 1982.

== See also ==
- North 21st Street Bridge, shorter but wider and using continuous beams, also designed by Waddell & Harrington and also NRHP-listed
