= Curlew Bridge =

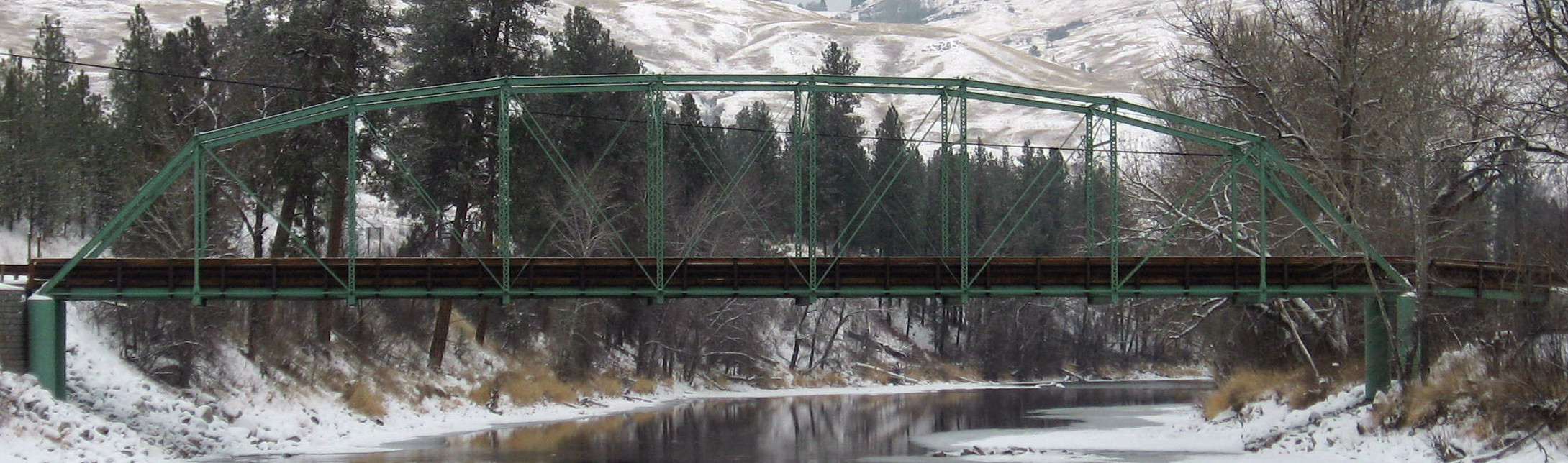
- Coordinates: 48°53′07″N 118°36′04″W
- Carries: Ferry Street
- Crosses: Kettle River
- Locale: Curlew, Washington
- Heritage status: NRHP

Characteristics
- Design: Pin-connected Parker Truss
- Material: Steel
- Total length: 200 ft (61 m)

History
- Architect: William Oliver
- Construction end: 1908
- Construction cost: $7,975
- Curlew Bridge
- U.S. National Register of Historic Places
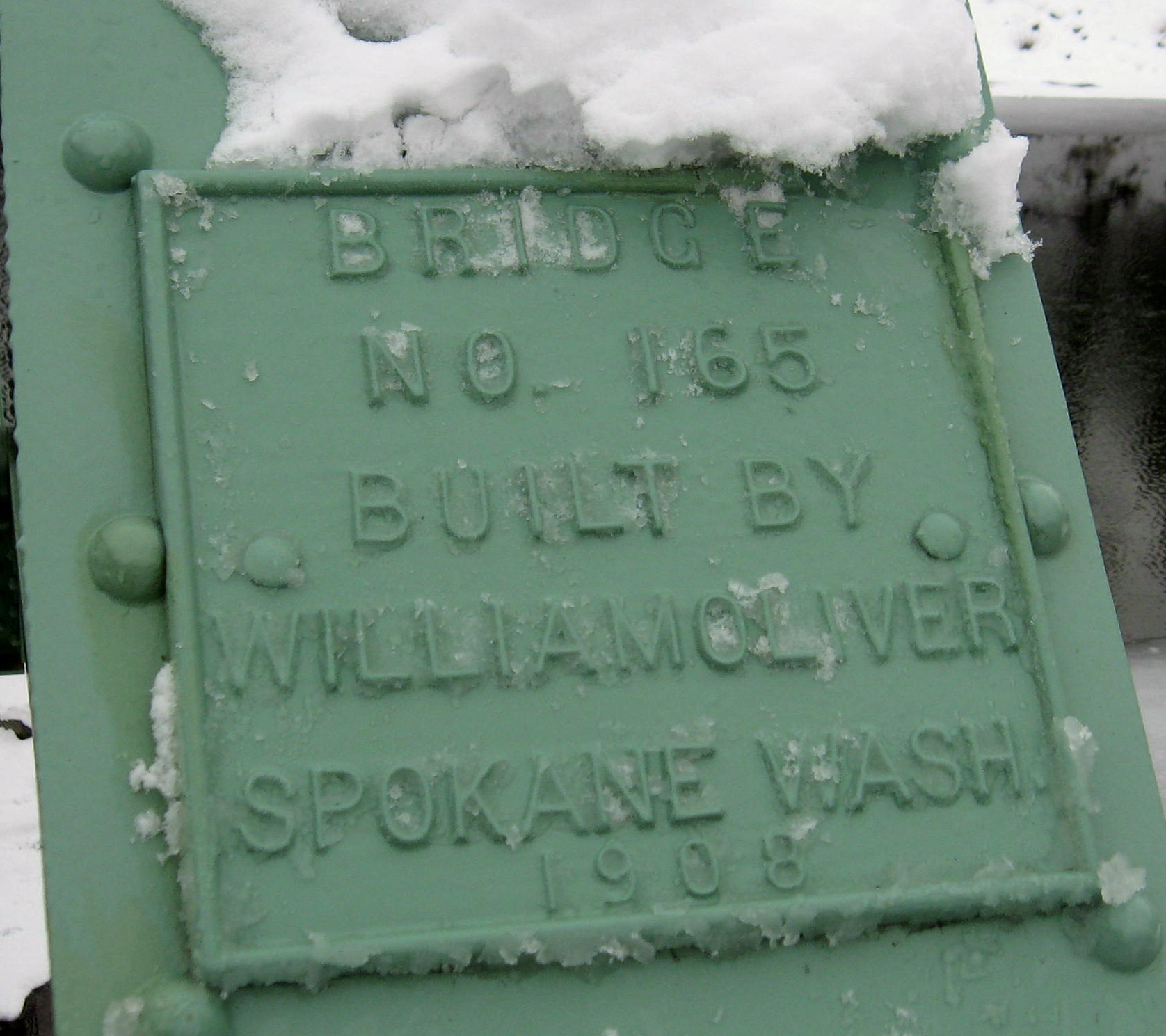
- Plaque identifying Curlew Bridge as No. 165
- Location: Curlew, Washington
- Coordinates: 48°53′07″N 118°36′05″W
- Area: Transportation Engineering
- Built: 1908
- Architect: William Oliver
- Architectural style: Parker Truss
- MPS: Historic Bridges/Tunnels in Washington TR
- NRHP reference No.: 82004210
- Added to NRHP: July 16, 1982

Location
- Interactive map of Curlew Bridge

The Curlew Bridge is a one-lane, pin-connected Parker Truss bridge originally built in 1908 at Curlew, Washington, US, to span the Kettle River just downstream from the point where the river turns north. After many years of partial repairs, the bridge was dismantled and rebuilt during 2006-2007, to restore the entire structure.

== Original Construction ==
This is the second bridge since 1901 to span the Kettle River at this spot. Originally used for a ferry crossing by the native tribes of the area, a cable ferry had been built in 1897 and washed away in the floods of 1898. To replace the ferry, a "Corduroy" bridge constructed from logs was erected in 1901. When the log bridge was destroyed by flood waters, bids were taken to replace the bridge in 1907. The contract was awarded to William Oliver for $7,975, and construction was completed in 1908. This was the No. 165 bridge built by William Oliver.

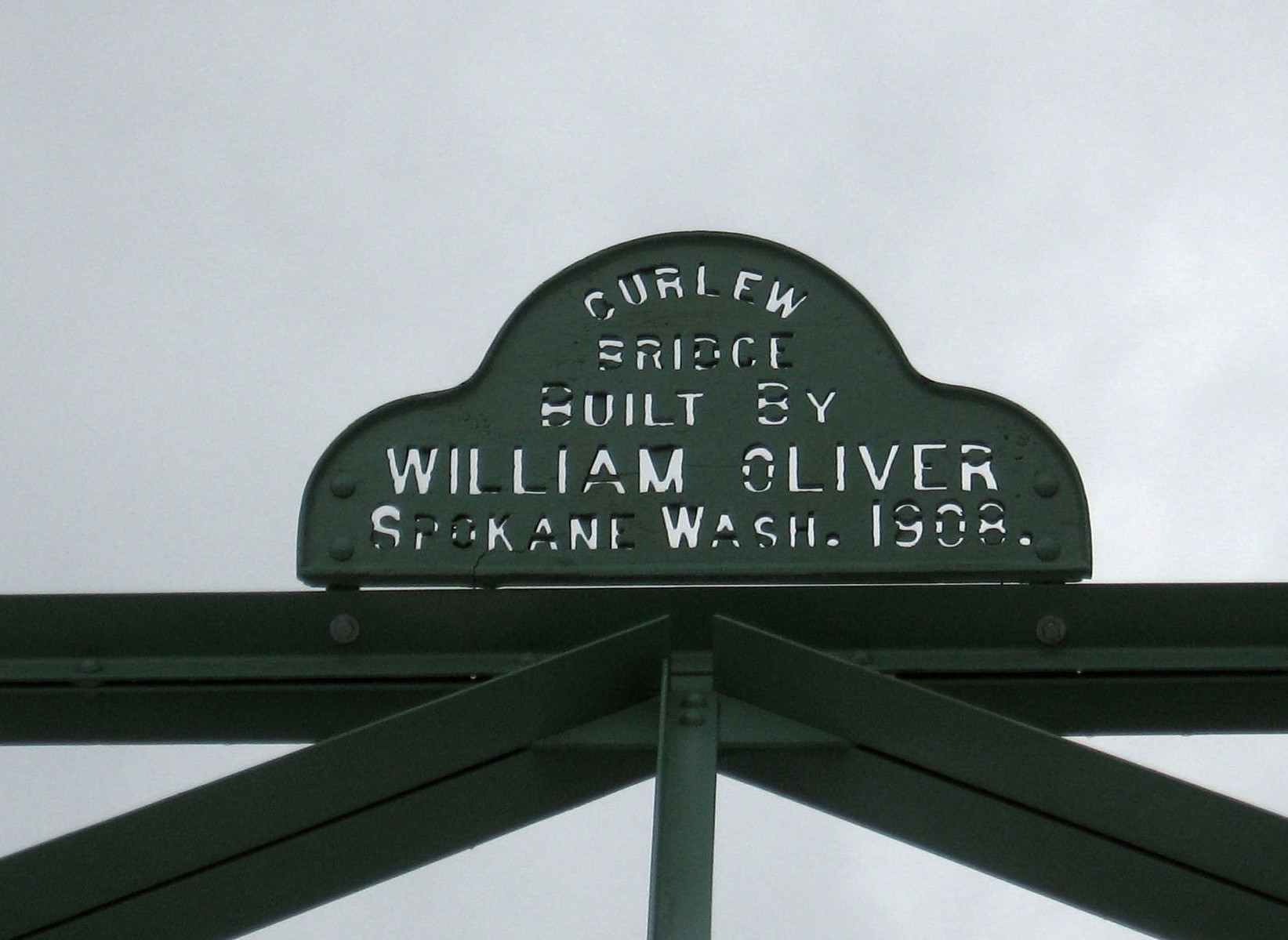
William Oliver's sign on east end of Bridge

== Refurbishment ==
General maintenance over the years involved painting of the bridge in 1935 and complete replacement of the wooden bridge deck several times. A general maintenance inspection in June 2004 revealed that several of the pins in the bridge were showing extreme wear, and the bridge was closed to all but foot-traffic.

Several options for replacement of the bridge had been discussed, but discarded due to the poor reception by the community. Removal of the bridge was also considered but rejected due to overwhelming community sentiment for saving the bridge.

The county applied for funds to rehabilitate the bridge in August 2004 and received funds in September 2004. Bids for the rehabilitation were taken and the job awarded to Wesslen Construction for $1,446,567. Work began in June 2006, with the bridge being entirely dismantled and transported to Spokane. Each part was inspected and repaired or replaced, including sandblasting all the parts and the replacement of the wooden stringers underneath the bridge to increase the load capacity. The parts were then transported back to Curlew on 3 semi-trailers and reassembled. The bridge was officially reopened on February 14, 2007.

== See also ==
List of Registered Historic Places in Washington
