= Dungeness River Bridge =

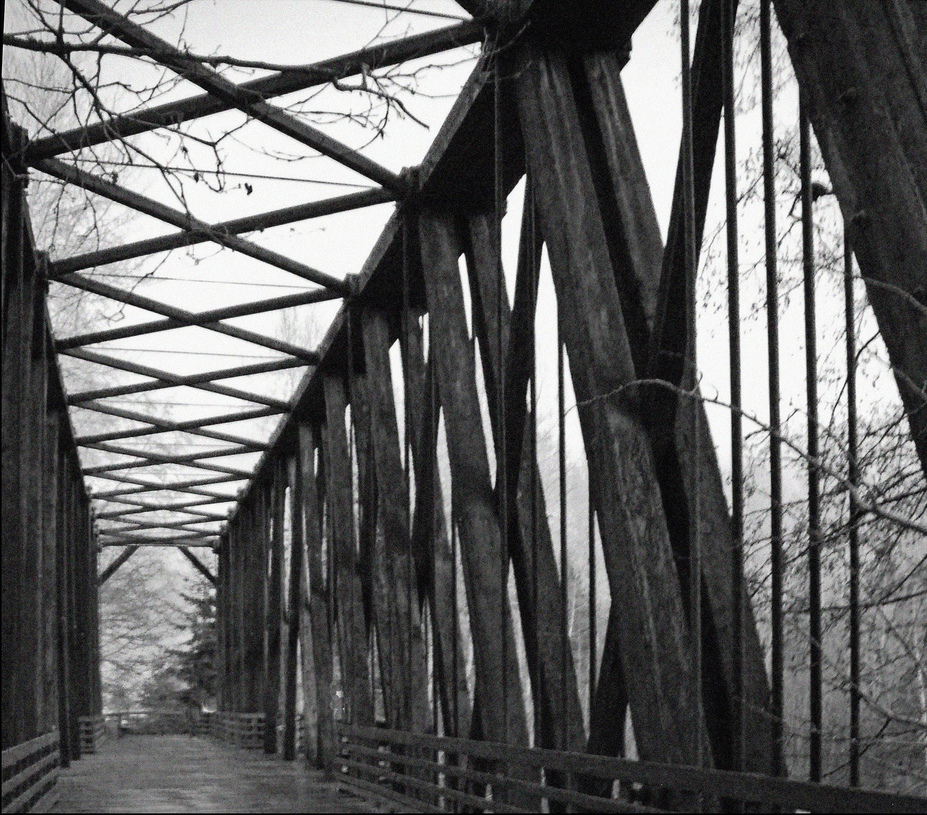
- Coordinates: 48°05′07″N 123°08′53″W
- Carries: Pedestrians
- Crosses: Dungeness River
- Locale: Sequim, Washington
- Heritage status: NRHP

Characteristics
- Design: Howe through truss
- Material: Timber

History
- Construction end: 1930
- Dungeness River Bridge
- U.S. National Register of Historic Places
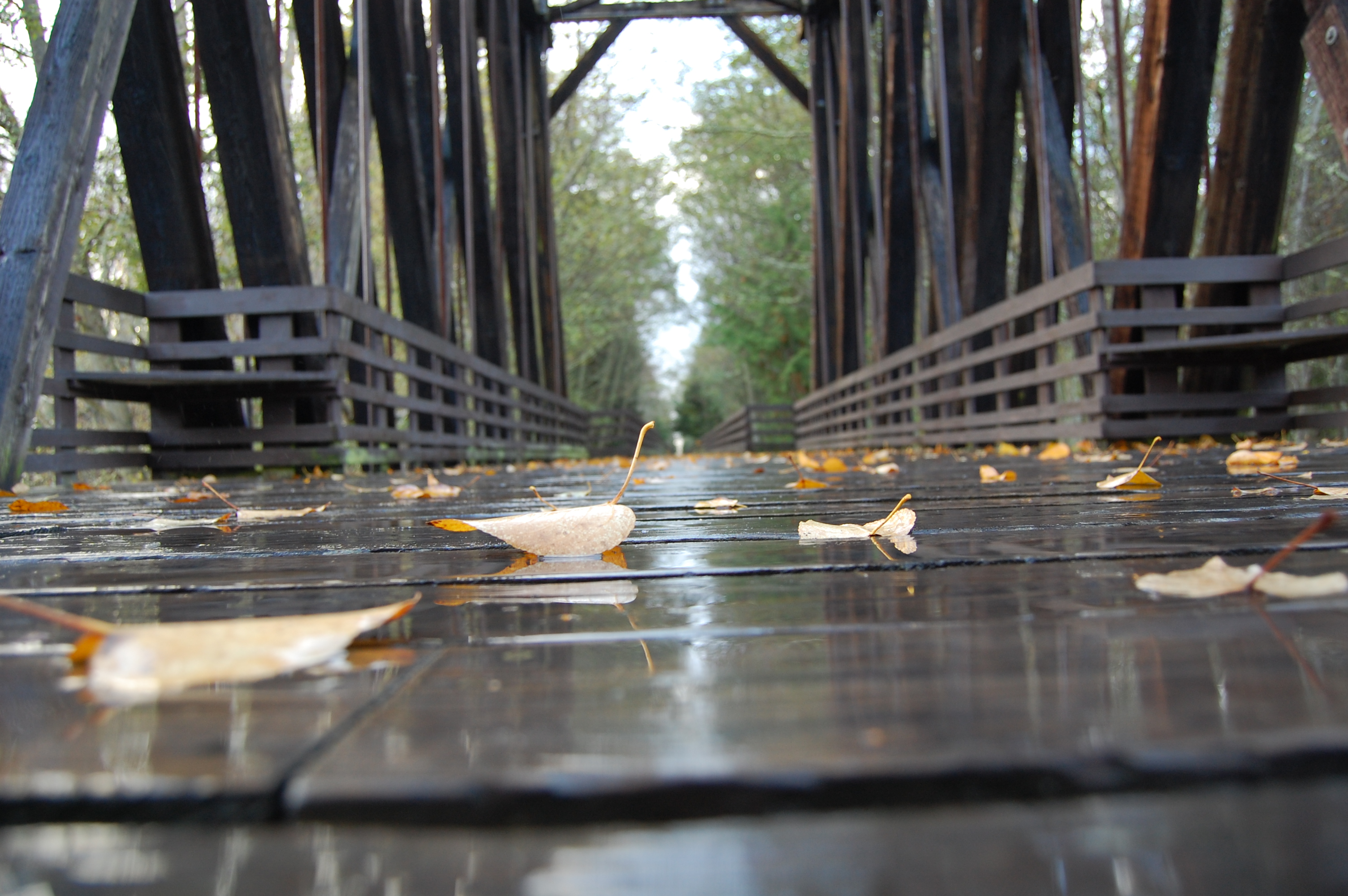

- Location within Washington (state)
- Location: Railroad Bridge Park, at end of West Hendrickson Road
- Nearest city: Sequim, Washington
- Coordinates: 48°05′07″N 123°08′52″W
- Built: 1930
- Architect: Chicago, Milwaukee, St. Paul and Pacific Railroad
- Architectural style: timber Howe through truss
- MPS: Historic Bridges/Tunnels in Washington State TR
- NRHP reference No.: 82004201
- Added to NRHP: July 16, 1982

Location
- Interactive map of Dungeness River Bridge

The Dungeness River Bridge is the centerpiece of Railroad Bridge Park near the town of Sequim, Washington. It crosses the Dungeness River. The bridge was first constructed by the Seattle, Port Angeles, and Western Railway, a subsidiary of the Chicago, Milwaukee, St. Paul and Pacific Railroad (also known as the Milwaukee Road) in 1916. Because of the ready availability of timber, the bridge was built of wood. This first bridge was replaced in 1930. The new bridge was also built of timber, and like its predecessor, is a through Howe truss 156 feet long and 22 feet high. Two wooden trestles are on the east and west approaches.

After the Milwaukee Road's bankruptcy, the bridge was left abandoned. In 1992, volunteers began to work on the bridge and replace planking and created a bike trail. In 1995, the property surrounding the bridge was purchased by the Washington State Audubon Society, which then created the Dungeness River Center and a park, called Railroad Bridge Park. The bike path through the park and over the bridge is connected to the Olympic Discovery Trail, a rails-to-trails initiative.

The bridge was listed in the National Register of Historic Places due to its being one of the last timber Howe through-truss railroad bridges still remaining in Washington.

In February 2015, due to high winds and rainfall, the Bridge's center collapsed. The repaired and improved bridge was reopened in March 2016.
