= Jose Rizal Bridge =

Arch bridge in Seattle, Washington, United States

Coordinates: 47.59584°N 122.317282°W

- 12th Avenue South Bridge
- U.S. National Register of Historic Places
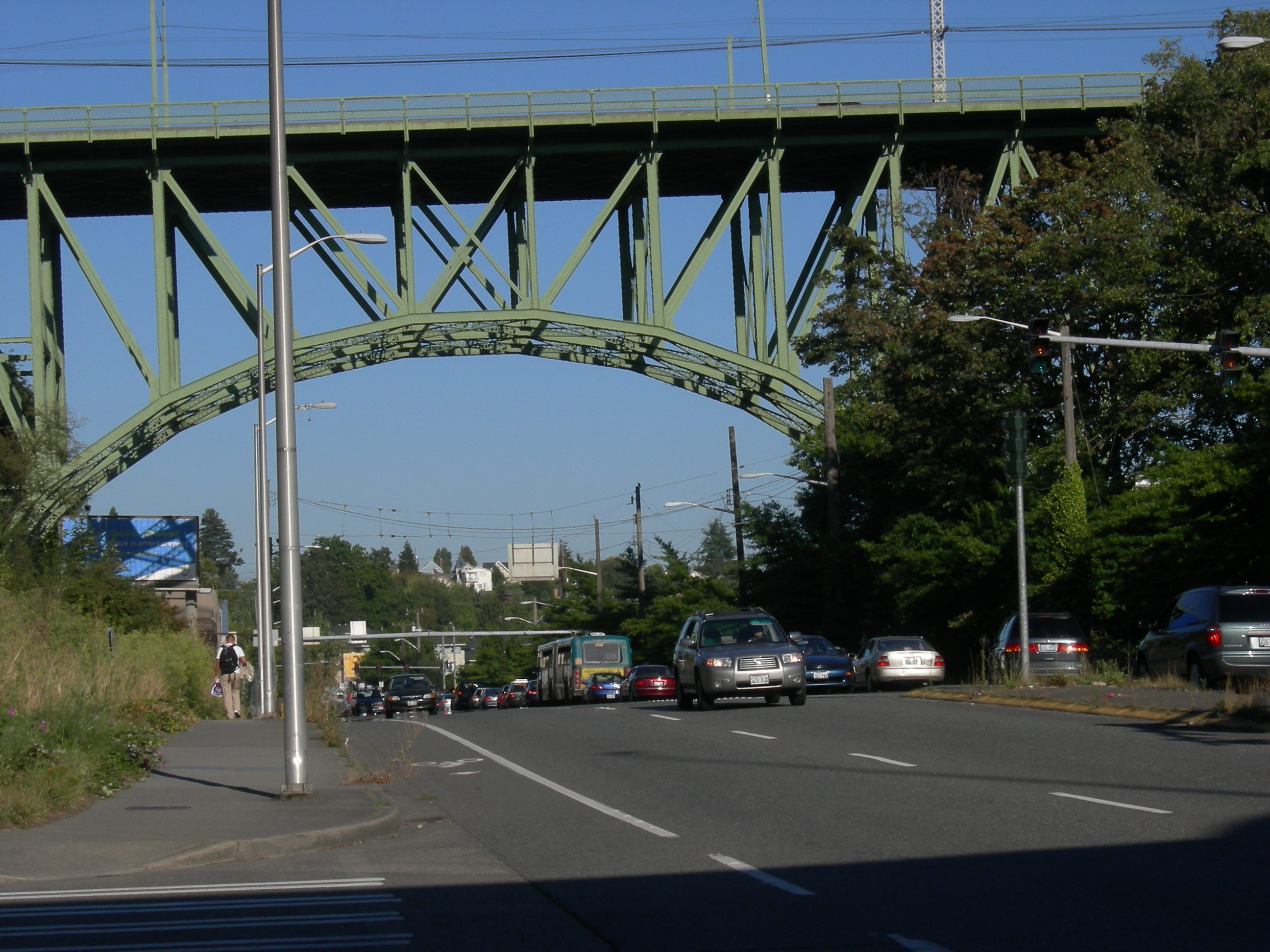
- Jose Rizal Bridge in 2007

- Location within Downtown Seattle
- Location: Seattle, Washington
- Built: 1911
- MPS: Historic Bridges/Tunnels in Washington State TR
- NRHP reference No.: 82004227
- Added to NRHP: July 16, 1982

The Jose Rizal Bridge carries 12th Avenue South over South Dearborn Street and Interstate 90 in Seattle, connecting the International District to Beacon Hill. Built in 1911, and originally called the 12th Avenue South Bridge or the Dearborn Street Bridge, it was one of the first permanent steel bridges in Seattle. It was renamed in honor of the Filipino patriot José Rizal in 1974, though the official name is not well known by Seattleites. The bridge was listed on the National Register of Historic Places in 1982, under its original name.

As a result of Paul Schell's attempt to light several bridges for the Seattle Millennium Project, the bridge is illuminated by floodlights.

In 2002, a police informant was found murdered near a homeless encampment under the bridge.

The bridge originally carried four lanes of traffic until 2021, when they were reduced to two lanes to accommodate a set of protected bicycle lanes.

== See also ==
- List of Seattle bridges
- National Register of Historic Places listings in Seattle
