= Devil's Corner Cliff Walk =

- U.S. National Register of Historic Places
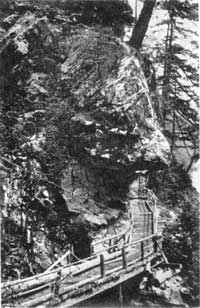
- Location: Ross Lake National Recreation Area
- Nearest city: Newhalem, Washington
- Coordinates: 48°41′28″N 121°13′23″W
- Built: 1890's
- NRHP reference No.: 74000909
- Added to NRHP: June 7, 1974

The Devil's Corner Cliff Walk, also known as the Devils Elbow, is a feature of Ross Lake National Recreation Area. The stretch of trail that is referred to as the Devils Corner is about 500 ft. The walk was originally part of a longer trail named the Goat Trail.

The area the trail is now was first traversed by miners in the late 1870s. It wasn't until the 1890s when a tunnel was blasted into the cliffside and the wooden suspension bridge across the gorge was built that Devil's Corner was fully established. It functioned as pedestrian transportation across the Skagit River Valley until around the start of the 20th century. The trail was subject to many snow slides and rockfalls which would occasionally make it impassible by pedestrians.

In 1912, the U.S. Forest Service repaired the bridge and widened it to make safe for foot and horse traffic. Further repairs were undertaken in the 1920s by miners using wood from the Goodell Creek Sawmill.

The trail fell out of popularity around the 1920s when the Seattle City Light railroad was built through the area. Other modes of transportation were built around the Skagit River Valley, such as North Cascades Highway.

By the mid 1970s, the suspension bridge fell into disrepair and was considered unsafe for pedestrians. It was added to the National Register of Historic Places in 1974. The bridge was destroyed in 2015 during the Goodell Fire.

== See also ==
- Thompson, E. N. "North Cascades National Park Basic Data Study"
- Pitzer, Paul C. "A History of the Upper Skagit Valley, 1880-1924," M.A Thesis, University of Washington, 1966.
