= Monitor, Washington =

Unincorporated community in Washington, United States

- Unincorporated community
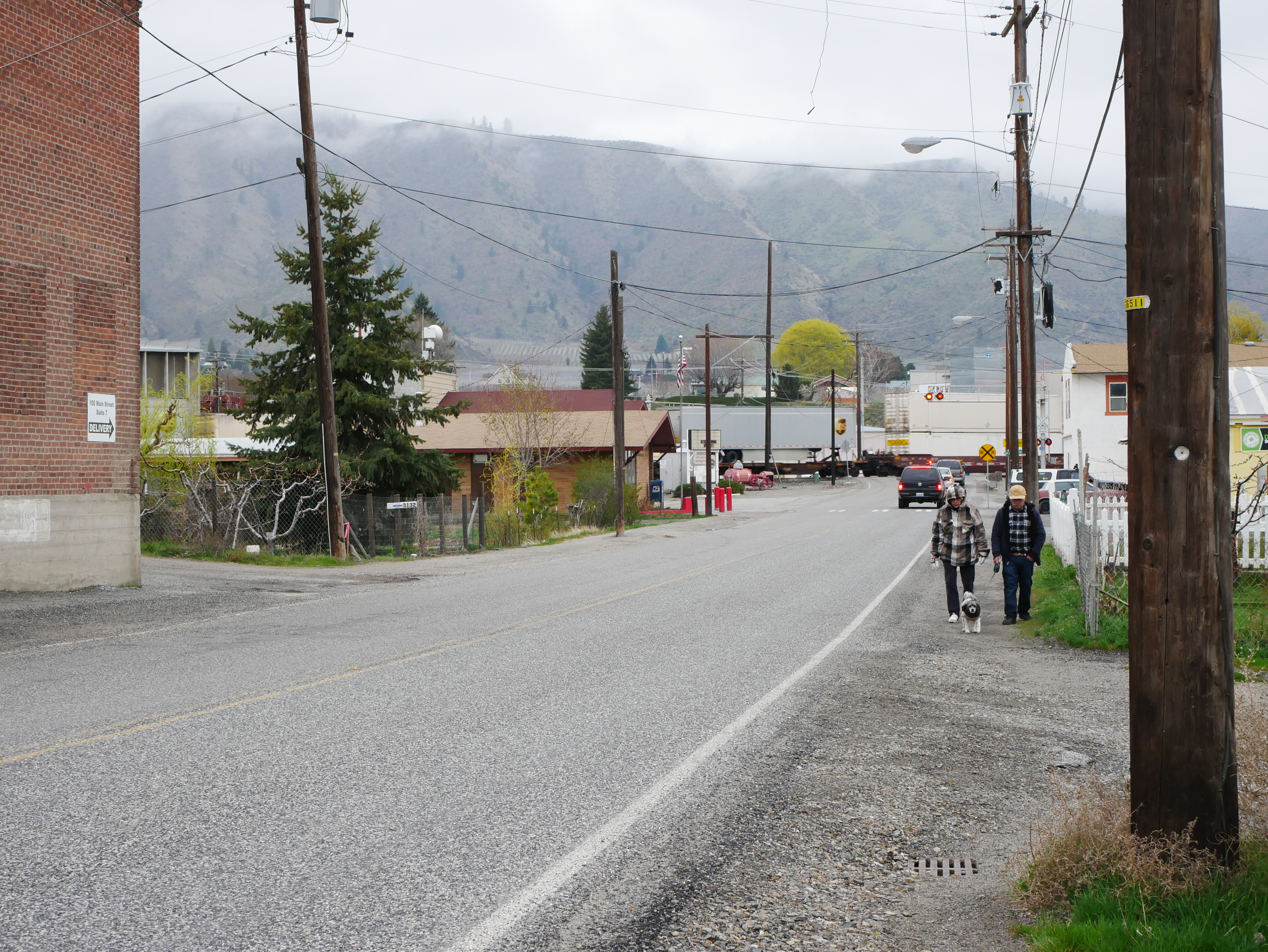
- Main Street

- Location within Washington (state)
- Coordinates: 47°29′12″N 120°25′05″W
- Country: United States
- State: Washington
- County: Chelan
- Elevation: 715 ft (218 m)
- Time zone: UTC-8 (Pacific (PST))
  - Summer (DST): UTC-7 (PDT)
- ZIP code: 98815
- Area code: 509
- GNIS feature ID: 1523315

Monitor is a small unincorporated community in Chelan County, Washington, United States. It is situated along the Wenatchee River about 8 miles upstream from its junction with the Columbia River in the fertile Wenatchee Valley.

Monitor is part of the Wenatchee–East Wenatchee Metropolitan Statistical Area.

The USPS ZIP Code for Monitor is 98836. According to data from the 2000 census, the total population in the Monitor ZIP code was 342 persons. Monitor itself is not incorporated, and is not tracked by the Census.

== History ==
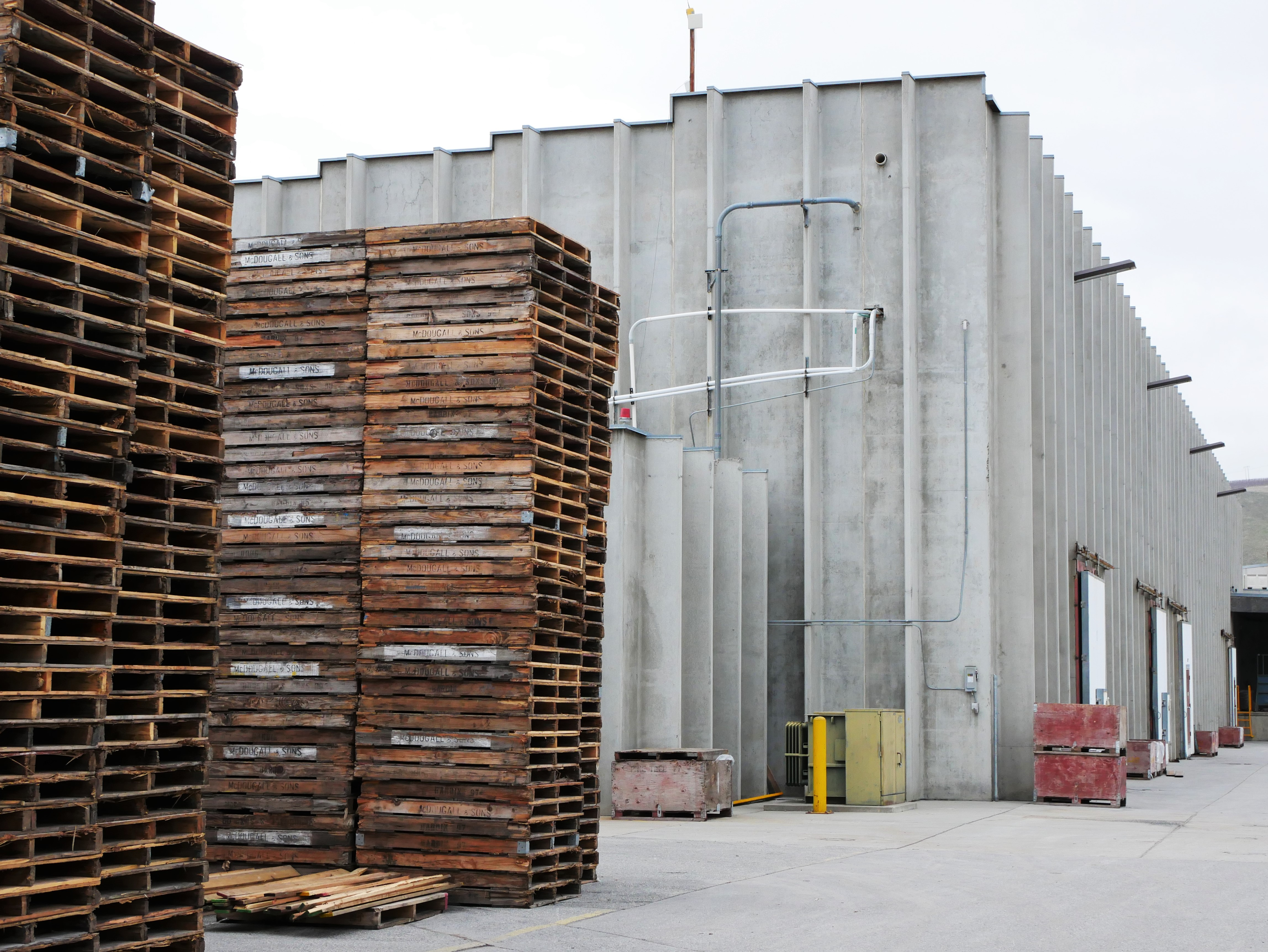
McDougall & Sons Fruit Packing Shed, Monitor, Washington

Before the existence of Monitor, the area was known by settlers as Brown's Flat, named after Reuben Brown who settled there in 1885. In these days, the Wenatchee River formed the boundary between old Kittitas and Okanogan counties. At the site of Monitor a school was built to serve school districts on both sides of the river.

The Great Northern Railway passed through in 1892, causing little stir in the area but jump-starting the construction of the Peshastin irrigation ditch, which would bring water the area and make it a prime place for agriculture. Constructed piecemeal by local contractors and land-owners, the portion of the ditch dug through Monitor was by rancher James Weythman and the Brown Brothers. The ditch was completed in the early 1900s and local orchards thrived. Monitor emerged as an agricultural shipping point along the railroad and a small community grew around the warehouses. A post office was established in 1902 and the citizens chose to rename the community in honor of the Ironclad warship USS Monitor which fought for the Union navy in the Battle of Hampton Roads during the American Civil War. The town currently has a post office and several small businesses located along US 2, which bypasses Monitor on the north side of the Wenatchee River.

== Geography ==
Monitor is located alongside the Wenatchee River in the lower reaches of the Wenatchee Valley, approximately 8 miles upstream from the river's mouth at the Columbia River. The city of Wenatchee, the largest in the region, is located at the confluence of the two rivers. The floor of the valley at Monitor is located at 715 feet above sea level, though rugged slopes rise immediately to the north of the community to a height of nearly 1,500 feet. Peaks over 2,400 feet are located within two miles to the south and west of the community.

U.S. Route 2 and U.S. Route 97 pass concurrently through Monitor along the north side of the Wenatchee River. They connect the community with Wenatchee, 8 miles downstream, and to Cashmere about 4 miles upstream.

== Climate ==
This region experiences warm (but not hot) and dry summers, with no average monthly temperatures above 71.6 °F. According to the Köppen Climate Classification system, Monitor has a warm-summer Mediterranean climate, abbreviated "Csb" on climate maps.
