= 2023 United States wildfires =

Major wildfires in the U.S. in 2023

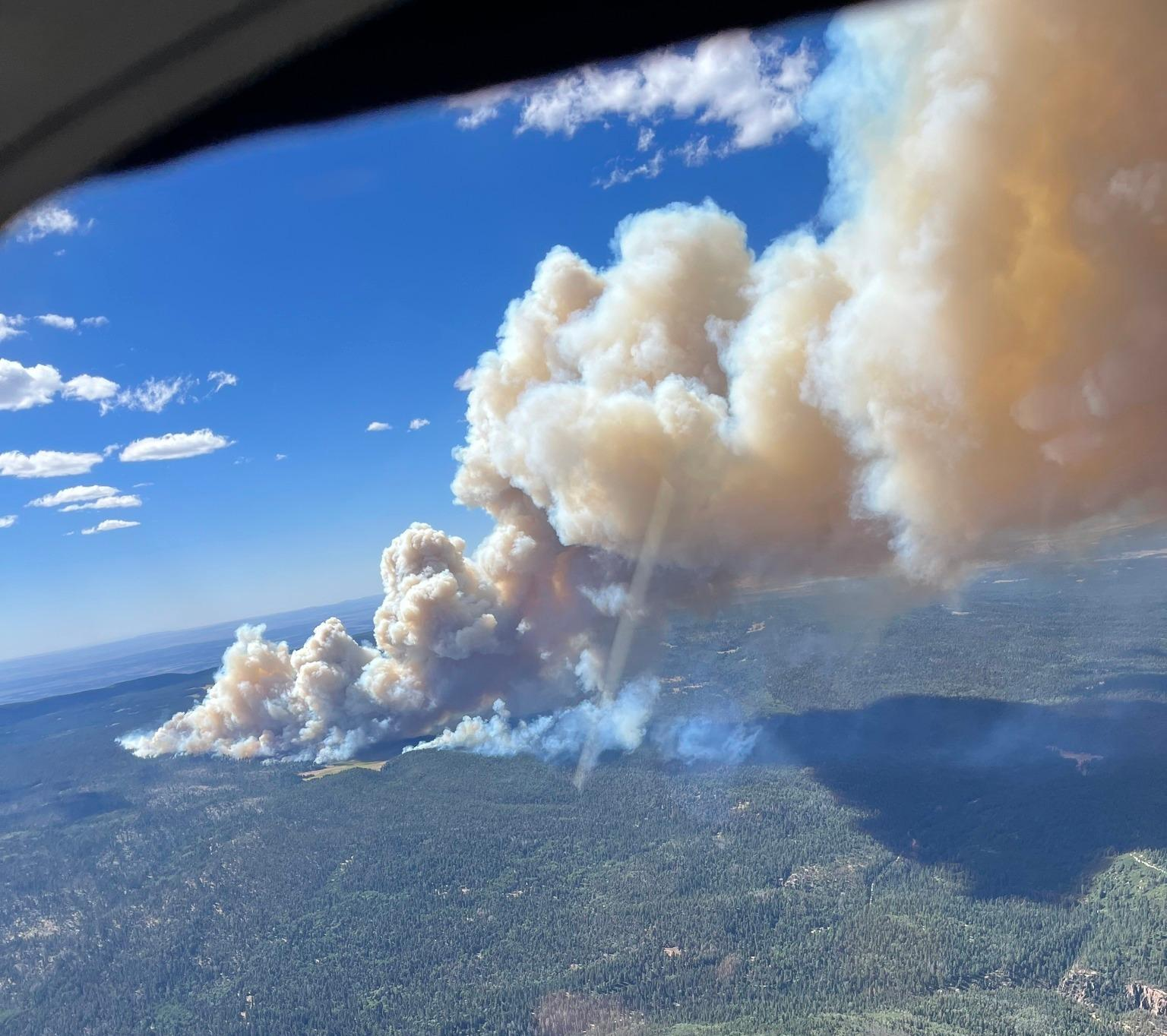
- Aerial view of the Black Feather Fire in New Mexico on August 24
- Date: January 2023 – December 13, 2023

Statistics
- Total fires: 56,580
- Total area: 2,693,910 acres (1,090,190 ha; 10,901.9 km^{2})

Impacts
- Deaths: 110 (Note: Includes 102 in Hawaii, 4 in California, 2 in Louisiana, and 2 in Washington.)
- Structures destroyed: 4,318

This is a list of wildfires that occurred across the United States that burned more than 1,000 acres (400 ha), produced significant structural damage or casualties, or have otherwise been notable.

== Background ==
=== Seasonal background ===
While most wildfires in the United States occur from May to November, wildfires can occur during any time of the year. Peak fire season is normally in August, when it is the hottest and driest. Wildfire outside of the fire season are becoming more common from climate change and changing weather patterns. Rising temperatures are leading to earlier snowmelt and later fall and winter precipitation. Drought and hot, dry weather events are becoming more common. Forests pests, such as bark beetles, and invasive species, such as cheatgrass, kill trees and make forests more vulnerable. Areas with dense vegetation or tree cover provide ample fire fuel.

Wildfire season is expected to worsen from climate change. Warmer, drier conditions are expected to increase fire severity in California and the Southwest.

== List of wildfires ==
| Name | State | County (Note: Or county equivalent.) | Acres | Start date | Containment date (Note: Containment means that fire crews have established and secured control lines around the fire's perimeter. These lines are artificial barriers, like trenches or cleared vegetation, designed to stop the fire's spread, or natural barriers like rivers. Containment reflects progress in managing the fire but does not necessarily mean the fire is starved of fuel, under control, or put out.) | Notes | Ref. |
|---|---|---|---|---|---|---|---|
| Mile 31 | Florida | Broward | 13,500 | March 12 | March 16 | Smoke prompted the closure of 40 miles (64 km) on U.S. Route 27 due to visibility concerns. | |
| Right Gate | Florida | Polk | 658 | March 26 | March 29 | Burned east of Frostproof. Prompted evacuations and destroyed 200 outbuildings. | |
| Double Gate | Florida | Volusia | 1,866 | March 26 | March 28 | Burned in Tiger Bay State Forest. | |
| 403 | Colorado | Gunnison | 1,096 | March 31 | April 13 | The National Centers for Environmental Information (NCEI) did not document information about this wildfire. | |
| Cypress Camp Trail | Florida | Collier | 9,749 | April 4 | 2023 | Burned 1 mile (1.6 km) north of Interstate 75. | |
| Lowry | Nebraska | Garfield | 6,000 | April 10 | April 13 | Caused from a prescribed burn. Burned 15 miles (24 km) north of Burwell, destroying four structures and causing four injuries. | |
| Jimmy's Waterhole | New Jersey | Ocean | 3,859 | April 11 | April 13 | Unknown cause. Burned near State Route 539 and prompted evacuations. | |
| Rock Creek | Nebraska | Jefferson | 1,600 | April 11 | 2023 | Burned southeast of Fairbury. Closed Rock Creek Station. | |
| McCann | Nebraska | Cherry | 7,040 | April 12 | 2023 | Caused by a suspected burn pile. Burned in McKelvie National Forest. Impacted three ranches. | |
| Crystal Peak | Pennsylvania | Luzerne | 4,376 | April 12 | April 18 | Burned southeast of Mountain Top. Closed Interstate 476. | |
| Arcadia | Wisconsin | Monroe | 3,096 | April 12 | April 14 | Damaged three structures and destroyed one outbuilding near Fort McCoy. | |
| Cooksley Complex | Nebraska | Custer | 40,000 | April 13 | 2023 | Lightning-caused. Burned near and closed State Route 2, destroying two structures and damaging three others. | |
| Log Swamp | New Jersey | Ocean | 1,607 | April 15 | April 16 | Unknown cause. Burned in Little Egg. Closed State Route 539. | |
| Great Lakes | North Carolina | Craven, Jones | 32,156 | April 19 | 2023 | Undetermined cause. Burned 1 mile (1.6 km) south of New Bern. Was 95% contained on June 3. | |
| Gageby Creek | Colorado | Bent | 4,600 | April 19 | April 28 | The National Centers for Environmental Information (NCEI) did not document information about this wildfire. | |
| Pool Hollow | Pennsylvania | Centre | 1,200 | April 20 | 2023 | Human-caused. Burned 5 miles (8.0 km) south of Phillipsburg. | |
| County Road 121 | Florida | Nassau | 1,600 | April 20 | 2023 | Caused by a vehicle fire. Burned 3 miles (4.8 km) northwest of Bryceville. | |
| Major | Florida | Lake | 4,952 | April 27 | June 7 | Lightning-caused. Burned 10 miles (16 km) northwest of Astor. | |
| Berg | Minnesota | Marshall | 1,725 | April 30 | May 22 | Burned in the Agassiz National Wildlife Refuge. | |
| Sandy | Florida | Collier | 19,814 | May 1 | May 26 | Lightning-caused. Burned 22 miles (35 km) north of Carnstown. | |
| Southeast Thief | Minnesota | Marshall | 1,702 | May 3 | 2023 | | |
| Natick | Nebraska | Thomas | 1,849 | May 3 | May 7 | Undetermined cause. Burned southwest of Halsey. | |
| Big Tank | New Mexico | San Miguel | 1,181 | May 4 | May 8 | Lightning-caused. Burned 15 miles (24 km) east of Las Vegas. | |
| Pass | New Mexico | Catron | 59,833 | May 18 | September 7 | Lightning-caused. Burned 40 miles (64 km) east of Winston. | |
| Dillon Creek | Oregon | Klamath | May 20 | June 7 | Lightning-caused. | | |
| Volunteer | Arizona | Coconino | 2,675 | May 23 | 2023 | | |
| Allen Road | New Jersey | Ocean | 5,475 | May 31 | June 3 | Burned in Tuckerton. Evacuated a campground and closed part of Garden State Parkway. | |
| Wilderness Trail | Michigan | Crawford | 2,410 | June 3 | June 22 | Caused by a campfire. Burned 6 miles (9.7 km) southeast of Grayling. | |
| Danny | California | Los Angeles | 1,560 | June 4 | June 5 | Unknown cause. | |
| Bullet | Arizona | Maricopa | 3,240 | June 4 | June 2023 | | |
| Ridge | Arizona | Coconino | 10,210 | June 4 | August 22 | | |
| Clear Lake | Florida | Leon | 5,620 | June 8 | 2023 | Unknown cause. Burned 4 miles (6.4 km) southwest of Tallahassee. | |
| Geology | California | San Bernardino | 1,088 | June 10 | June 16 | Unknown cause. Burned in Joshua Tree National Park. | |
| Hat Rock | Oregon & Washington | Umatilla (OR), Walla Walla (WA) | 16,816 | June 13 | June 17 | Threatened 243 structures. | |
| Bone Lightning | California | Tuolumne | 1,163 | June 15 | July 10 | Lightning caused in a planned prescribed burn area and was managed as a prescribed burn for resource purposes. | |
| Pulp Road | North Carolina | Brunswick | 15,642 | June 15 | June 29 | Human-caused. Burned 5 miles (8.0 km) north of Supply. | |
| Diamond | Arizona | Maricopa | 1,960 | June 27 | 2023 | | |
| Beehive | Arizona | Santa Cruz | 10,745 | June 30 | 2023 | | |
| Pilot | Arizona | Yavapai, Mohave | 34,810 | July 1 | August 3 | Human caused. | |
| Tunnel Five | Washington | Skamania | 529 | July 2 | July 11 | Caused by a BNSF Railway train. Burned 2.25 miles (3.62 km) west of White Salmon and destroyed ten structures. Prompted evacuations for 1,000 residents. | |
| Little Bear | Idaho | Idaho | 1,221 | July 3 | 2023 | Lighting-caused. Burned 12 miles (19 km) southwest of Powell. | |
| Brushy | New Mexico | Hidalgo | 6,045 | July 3 | July 12 | Burned in the Animas Mountains. | |
| 3.2 Scrub Jay | Florida | Brevard | 1,261 | July 5 | July 8 | Burned 6 miles (9.7 km) northeast of Titusville. | |
| Alder Creek | Oregon | Wheeler | 1,551 | July 6 | July 15 | Burned on Bureau of Land Management land. | |
| District | California | Kern | 1,044 | July 7 | July 11 | Caused by a semitruck. Burned north of Lebec. | |
| Airplane Lake | Washington | Chelan | 6,956 | July 7 | September 27 | Lightning-caused. Received heavy rain on September 27, and it was deemed "very unlikely" there would be perimeter growth. | |
| Devil's Butte | Oregon | Gilliam | 2,865 | July 10 | July 18 | Lightning-caused. Closed State Route 208 and destroyed two fire engines. | |
| Southtom | Idaho | Ada | 1,129 | July 10 | July 10 | Burned 12 miles (19 km) south of Boise Airport. | |
| I70 MM 217 | Utah | Grand | 1,802 | July 10 | July 1 | Caused by a rollover crash. Burned near the Utah/Colorado border and closed Interstate 70. | |
| Campbell | Arizona | Greenlee | 1,416 | July 10 | 2023 | | |
| Divide | New Mexico | Catron | 26,514 | July 13 | August 11 | Cost $1.8 million in suppression. | |
| Rabbit | California | Riverside | 8,355 | July 14 | July 22 | Unknown cause. Prompted evacuations near Lakeview. | |
| Flat | Oregon | Curry | 34,242 | July 15 | 2023 | Human-caused. Burned 2 miles (3.2 km) southeast of Agness. | |
| Colt | Montana | Missoula | 7,154 | July 18 | | Lightning-caused. Prompted evacuation orders north of Seeley Lake. | |
| Adams Robles Complex Fire | Arizona | Cochise | 5,232 | July 19 | July 2023 | | |
| Guzzler | Arizona | Coconino | 1,542 | July 19 | 2023 | Lightning-caused. Burned about 15 miles (24 km) northwest of Heber-Overgaard in Apache-Sitgreaves National Forest. | |
| Hayden | Idaho | Lemhi | 24,706 | July 19 | 2023 | Unknown cause. Burned in Salmon-Challis National Forest. | |
| Bowles Creek | Montana | Granite | 6,988 | July 20 | September 27 | Burned 27 miles (43 km) southwest of Philipsburg. | |
| Simnasho | Oregon | Wasco | 1,280 | July 21 | 2023 | Prompted evacuations and closed U.S. Route 26. | |
| Grapevine | Arizona | Yavapai | 1,049 | July 21 | August 9 | | |
| Rocky | Utah | Tooele | 1,300 | July 21 | July 22 | Unknown cause. Burned near Ibapah. | |
| Newell Road | Washington | Klickitat | 60,551 | July 21 | July 29 | Unknown cause. Destroyed "many" structures southeast of Bickleton. | |
| Golden | Oregon | Klamath | 2,137 | July 22 | August 7 | Burned north of Bonanza. Destroyed 48 primary structures and 69 outbuildings. | |
| Bedrock | Oregon | Lane | 31,950 | July 22 | October 4 | Closed part of Willamette National Forest. | |
| Diamond | Arizona | Maricopa | 1,960 | July 22 | July 2023 | | |
| Round Hill | Arizona | Pima | 2,900 | July 22 | 2023 | Lightning-caused. Burned 10 miles (16 km) northeast of Sasabe. | |
| Eskiminzin | Arizona | Pinal | 1,113 | July 23 | 2023 | Lightning-caused. | |
| Gallineta | Arizona | Pima | 1,601 | July 23 | 2023 | Burned northwest of San Miguel. | |
| Pasture | New Mexico | Catron | 10,986 | July 23 | August 11 | Lightning-caused. Burned in Gila National Forest in difficult terrain that complicated suppression efforts. | |
| Elkhorn | Idaho | Idaho | 26,048 | July 24 | 2023 | Caused by an improperly extinguished campfire that rekindled. Destroyed several structures in Frank Church River of No Return Wilderness. | |
| Spoon | Arizona | Gila | 4,560 | July 24 | 2023 | Lightning-caused. Burned 26 miles (42 km) west of Whiteriver. | |
| Spring Creek | Colorado | Garfield | 3,256 | July 24 | October 1 | | |
| Pogo Mine Road | Alaska | Southeast Fairbanks | 48,792 | July 24 | 2023 | Lightning-caused. Burned 12 miles (19 km) north of Deltana. Was 72% contained on September 13. | |
| 6 Mile Pogo | Alaska | Southeast Fairbanks | 4,963 | July 24 | September 19 | Lightning-caused. | |
| McCoy Creek | Alaska | Fairbanks North Star | 13,792 | July 24 | 2023 | Lightning-caused. Burned 16 miles (26 km) east of Salcha. Was 7% contained on September 5. | |
| Jordan | Alaska | Yukon-Koyukuk | 1,640 | July 24 | September 21 | Lightning-caused. Burned 24 miles (39 km) east of Tanana. | |
| Big Knife | Montana | Lake | 7,200 | July 24 | | Lightning-caused. Burned 5 miles (8.0 km) east of Arlee. Prompted pre-evacuations west of the fire. | |
| Delta | Alaska | Southeast Fairbanks | 57,230 | July 25 | October 6 | Lightning-caused. Burned 18 miles (29 km) west of Delta Junction. | |
| Wickersham | Alaska | Yukon-Koyukuk | 1,841 | July 25 | August 29 | Lightning-caused. Burned north of Wickersham Dome. | |
| Teklanika River | Alaska | Yukon-Koyukuk | 8,858 | July 26 | 2023 | Lightning-caused. Burned 4 miles (6.4 km) northwest of Anderson and destroyed two houses. Was 17% contained on October 24. Part of the Anderson Complex. | |
| Lowline | Colorado | Gunnison | 1,999 | July 26 | December 13 | Lightning-caused. | |
| Prior | New Mexico | Catron | 12,841 | July 26 | September 21 | Lightning-caused. Burned in the Tularosa Mountains. | |
| Preacher | Alaska | Yukon-Koyukuk | 1,860 | July 27 | August 28 | Lightning-caused. Burned 37 miles (60 km) west of Center. | |
| Bonny | California | Riverside | 2,323 | July 27 | August 7 | Unknown cause. Prompted evacuations near Aguanga and destroyed one structure. | |
| Birch Creek | Alaska | Denali | 7,603 | July 27 | 2023 | Lightning-caused. Was 13% contained on September 5. Part of the Anderson Complex. | |
| Gold Hill | Arizona | Coconino | 6,239 | July 27 | 2023 | Naturally-caused. Burned 20 miles (32 km) northwest of Cameron. | |
| Rock Creek | Alaska | Denali | 33,893 | July 28 | 2023 | Lightning-caused. Was 48% contained on September 5. Part of the Anderson Complex. | |
| Lost Horse Creek | Alaska | Fairbanks North Star | 9,322 | July 28 | 2023 | Lightning-caused. Prompted evacuations north of Fairbanks. Was 23% contained on September 5. | |
| York | California & Nevada | San Bernardino (CA), Clark (NV) | 93,078 | July 28 | August 19 | Undetermined cause. Destroyed three structures. | |
| Mount Hayes | Alaska | Southeast Fairbanks | 6,720 | July 28 | 2023 | Lightning-caused. Burned 7 miles (11 km) southeast of Deltana. Was 76% contained on August 25. | |
| Bear Creek | Colorado | Hinsdale | 1,093 | July 28 | 2023 | Caused by lightning about 20 miles (32 km) northwest of Pagosa Springs. | |
| Middle Ridge | Montana | Sanders | 13,000 | July 29 | August 14 | Lightning-caused. Burned 15 miles (24 km) west of Ronan. | |
| Anderson Complex | Alaska | Denali | 58,933 | July 29 | 2023 | Included the Teklanika River, Birch Creek, Shores Landing, Rock Creek, Bear Creek, Kobe Road, Nenana River, and Nena River 2 fires. Prompted evacuations southwest of Anderson. Was 92% contained on August 25. | |
| Eagle Bluff | Washington | Okanogan | 16,428 | July 29 | August 13 | Burned near Oroville. Destroyed three primary structures and one outbuilding. Crossed the U.S.–Canada border. | |
| Sourdough | Washington | Whatcom | 7,377 | July 29 | 2023 | Lightning-caused. Burned near Diablo. Was 25% contained on September 28. | |
| Mill Pocket | Montana | Sanders | 1,869 | July 30 | August 19 | Lightning-caused. Burned 15 miles (24 km) west of Elmo. | |
| Niarada | Montana | Lake | 20,365 | July 30 | August 23 | Lightning-caused. Prompted pre-evacuations in Elmo and Big Arm. | |
| Bruce | Montana | Flathead | 3,613 | July 30 | 2023 | Burned in Flathead National Forest. Part of the Tin Soldier Complex. | |
| Sullivan | Montana | Flathead | 3,726 | July 30 | October 26 | Lightning-caused. Part of the Tin Soldier Complex. | |
| Doris Point | Montana | Flathead | 1,606 | July 30 | September 22 | Lightning-caused. Burned 8 miles (13 km) south of Hungry Horse. | |
| Ridge | Montana | Flathead | 3,655 | July 30 | 2023 | Lightning-caused. Burned southeast of Hungry Horse and closed Hungry Horse Reservoir. | |
| East Fork | Montana | Lincoln | 5,259 | July 30 | October 3 | Lightning-caused. Burned 12 miles (19 km) south of Trego. | |
| Kevinjik | Alaska | Yukon-Koyukuk | 3,318 | July 30 | August 22 | Lightning-caused. Burned west of Chalkyitsik. | |
| Communication Butte | Montana | Sanders | 1,423 | July 30 | August 4 | Human-caused. Burned 2 miles (3.2 km) north of Sčilíp. | |
| Little Mesa | Colorado | Delta | 4,009 | July 31 | September 20 | | |
| Corbie | Oregon | Harney, Malheur | 1,141 | August 1 | August 3 | Burned near State Route 78. | |
| East | California | Kern | 1,291 | August 1 | August 2 | Unknown cause. Burned northeast of Bakersfield. | |
| Draanjik | Alaska | Yukon-Koyukuk | 1,890 | August 3 | August 31 | Lightning-caused. Burned 51 miles (82 km) northeast of Circle. | |
| Ridge Creek | Idaho | Kootenai | 4,474 | August 3 | September 26 | Prompted evacuations and closed Lake Hayden. Cost $23.5 million in suppression. | |
| Thompson Ridge | Utah | Beaver | 7,253 | August 4 | September 7 | Lightning-caused. Burned 10 miles (16 km) southeast of Beaver. | |
| Napoleon | Alaska | Southeast Fairbanks | 1,036 | August 4 | September 1 | Lightning-caused. Burned 8.5 miles (13.7 km) east-northeast of Chicken. | |
| Lookout | Oregon | Lane, Linn | 25,754 | August 5 | October 10 | Lightning-caused. Burned 4 miles (6.4 km) northeast of McKenzie Bridge. | |
| No Name | California | Kern | 1,120 | August 5 | August 19 | Unknown cause. Burned southwest of Pearsonville. | |
| Quartz Ridge | Colorado | Archuleta | 2,850 | August 5 | October 30 | | |
| Black Feather | New Mexico | Rio Arriba | 2,198 | August 5 | 2023 | Lightning-caused. Burned 44 miles (71 km) northwest of Santa Fe. | |
| Almond | California | Kern | 5,228 | August 6 | August 7 | Unknown cause. Burned west of Lost Hills. | |
| Olinda | Hawaii | Maui | 1,081 | August 8 | September 28 | Killed three people. | |
| Kula | Hawaii | Maui | 202 | August 8 | September 28 | Destroyed 17 homes. | |
| Lahaina | Hawaii | Maui | 2,170 | August 8 | September 3 | Killed 102 people and destroyed 2,207 structures in Lahaina. Estimated cost of $5.52 billion (2023 USD) to rebuild. | |
| Pulehu-Kihei | Hawaii | Maui | 3,200 (Note: Estimated on August 15, 2023.) | August 8 | August 12 | Burned in Southern Maui. | |
| South Fork Complex | California | Trinity | 3,929 | August 15 | November 1 | Lightning-caused. Prompted evacuation warnings and included the 3-9 Fire, Sulfur Fire, and the Pellitreau Fire. | |
| Smith River Complex | California & Oregon | Del Norte (CA), Curry (OR), Josephine (OR) | 95,107 | August 15 | November 17 | Lightning-caused. Burned in Smith River National Recreation Area. | |
| Happy Camp Complex | California | Siskiyou | 21,275 | August 15 | October 31 | Unknown cause. Destroyed or damaged nine structures in Klamath National Forest. | |
| Redwood | California | Tulare | 2,248 | August 15 | 2023 | Lightning-caused. Burned in Sequoia National Park. Was 70% contained on October 22. | |
| East | Idaho | Valley | 3,313 | August 16 | 2023 | Burned 10 miles (16 km) east of Cascade. | |
| Light House Canyon | Utah | Emery | 2,037 | August 16 | 2023 | Lightning-caused. Burned 14 miles (23 km) southeast of East Carbon. Was 85% contained on November 6. | |
| Valentine | Arizona | Gila | 7,724 | August 16 | December 1 | Lightning-caused. Burned 11 miles (18 km) of Young. Suppression efforts cost $10 million. | |
| Black Mountain | Wyoming | Hot Springs | 2,493 | August 18 | 2023 | Human-caused. Burned 22 miles (35 km) east of Thermopolis. | |
| River Road East | Montana | Sanders | 17,313 | August 18 | September 28 | Burned near Paradise and destroyed about 15 structures. Lawsuit alleged BNSF Railway and Montana Rail Link were responsible for the fire's ignition. | |
| Gray | Washington | Spokane | 10,085 | August 18 | 2023 | Burned in Medical Lake and destroyed 240 structures and killed one person. Was 97% contained on September 15. | |
| Oregon | Washington | Spokane | 10,817 | August 18 | 2023 | Human-caused. Destroyed 126 houses and 258 outbuildings in Elk. Was 97% contained on September 15. | |
| Plant | California | Santa Barbara | 5,464 | August 18 | August 30 | Burned in New Cuyama. | |
| Rock Pond | Florida | Liberty | 2,086 | August 19 | 2023 | Unknown cause. | |
| Black Mountain | Idaho | Twin Falls | 1,312 | August 20 | 2023 | Lightning-caused. Burned 23 miles (37 km) southeast of Twin Falls. | |
| Tiger Island | Louisiana | Beauregard | 31,290 | August 22 | October 23 | Caused by arson. Destroyed 40 residential structures and prompted the evacuation of Merryville. | |
| Ida | Louisiana | Vernon | 3,628 | August 24 | October 23 | Unknown cause. Burned 12 miles (19 km) southeast of Leesville. | |
| Highway 133 | Louisiana | Rapides, Vernon | 7,124 | August 24 | 2023 | Unknown cause. Burned northeast of Pitkins. Was 99% contained on October 25. | |
| Camp Creek | Oregon | Clackamas, Multnomah | 2,055 | August 24 | 2023 | Lightning-caused. Burned 10 miles (16 km) east of Sandy. | |
| Tyee Ridge Complex | Oregon | Douglas | 7,945 | August 24 | 2023 | Lightning-caused. Burned 10 miles (16 km) west of Sutherlin. | |
| Chilcoot | Oregon | Douglas | 1,948 | August 24 | 2023 | Burned in Umpqua National Forest. | |
| Anvil | Oregon | Curry | 22,170 | August 25 | 2023 | Closed parts of Rogue River-Siskiyou National Forest until June 28, 2024. | |
| Petes Lake | Oregon | Lane | 3,254 | August 25 | 2023 | Lightning-caused. Closed parts of Three Sisters Wilderness. | |
| Big Creek | Idaho | Franklin | 2,980 | August 26 | November 2 | Lightning-caused. Burned 18 miles (29 km) southwest of Montpelier. | |
| Olympic National Park | Washington | Jefferson | 4,795 | August 28 | October 18 | Lightning-caused. Closed trails in Olympic National Park. | |
| Cottonwood Canyon | Oregon | Sherman | 2,316 | August 29 | September 2 | Closed State Route 206 and burned on both sides of the John Day River. | |
| Telegraph | Idaho | Lincoln | 2,000 | August 29 | August 30 | Burned along State Highway 75. | |
| Coal Ridge | Montana | Blaine | 1,200 | August 29 | September 2 | Burned 5 miles (8.0 km) north of the Missouri River. | |
| Pryor Creek Road | Montana | Yellowstone | 3,231 | August 29 | | Human-caused. Burned 5 miles (8.0 km) west of Pryor. | |
| Dry Lake | Colorado | Archuleta | 1,372 | August 30 | September 12 | | |
| Blue Lake | Washington | Chelan | 1,074 | September 1 | December 11 | Burned 13 miles (21 km) southwest of Mazama. Closed State Route 20. | |
| Wedge | Idaho | Blaine | 7,375 | September 9 | September 10 | Likely caused by a vehicle dragging an object on State Highway 75. Burned south of Timmerman Junction. | |
| Quarry | California | Tuolumne | 9,402 | September 9 | 2023 | Lightning-caused. Burned in Stanislaus National Forest. Was 71% contained on November 24. | |
| Morgan | Oregon | Lake | 2,289 | September 18 | 2023 | Burned 8 miles (13 km) north of Quartz Mountain. | |
| Buford | New Mexico | Rio Arriba | 2,358 | September 19 | 2023 | Lightning-caused. Burned 12 miles (19 km) west of Corona. | |
| Box | Utah | Sevier | 2,038 | September 19 | 2023 | Lightning-caused. Due to low fire risk from heavy precipitation, was allowed to burn for ecosystem restoration. | |
| Hope | Colorado | Montezuma | 1,290 | September 21 | October 7 | Lightning-caused. Burned 9 miles (14 km) northwest of Dolores. | |
| Iron | Colorado | Moffat | 7,392 | September 29 | October 5 | Undetermined cause. Burned 18 miles (29 km) northwest of Craig. | |
| Rabbit | California | Tulare | 2,856 | September 30 | November 14 | Lightning-caused. Burned in Sequoia National Forest. | |
| Collett Ridge | North Carolina | Cherokee | 5,505 | October 23 | November 22 | Lightning-caused. Burned 3 miles (4.8 km) southeast of Andrews. | |
| Trail Springs | Colorado | Archuleta | 1,358 | October 23 | 2023 | Lighting-caused. Burned 12 miles (19 km) northwest of Pagosa Springs. Was 44% contained on November 24. | |
| Quaker Run | Virginia | Madison | 3,937 | October 24 | November 17 | Burned in Shenandoah National Park. Closed several trails. | |
| Mililani | Hawaii | Honolulu | 1,696 | October 30 | December 1 | Burned 20 miles (32 km) north of Honolulu. Damaged rainforest in Oʻahu Forest National Wildlife Refuge. | |
| Highland | California | Riverside | 2,487 | October 30 | November 6 | Burned in Aguanga. Destroyed thirteen structures, damaged seven others, and injured two firefighters. | |
| Canyon | California | San Diego | 7,000 | October 30 | November 8 | Burned in Camp Pendleton. | |
| Matts Creek | Virginia | Bedford | 11,020 | November 12 | November 27 | Unknown cause. Burned 5 miles (8.0 km) northwest of Big Island. | |
| Black Bear | North Carolina | Haywood | 2,008 | November 16 | 2023 | Human-caused. Burned north of Interstate 40. Was 80% contained on December 3. | |
| South | California | Ventura | 2,715 | December 9 | December 12 | Burned south of Santa Paula. | |

Perimeters of wildfires in the United States during 2023 (>1000 acres) (map data)

== See also ==
- 2023 Canadian wildfires
- 2023 Arizona wildfires
- 2023 California wildfires
- 2023 Colorado wildfires
- 2023 Florida wildfires
- 2023 Hawaii wildfires
- 2023 Louisiana wildfires
- 2023 New Mexico wildfires
- 2023 Oregon wildfires
- 2023 Utah wildfires
- 2023 Washington wildfires
