= 2023 in Oregon =

- Decades: 2000s; 2010s; 2020s
- See also: History of Oregon; Historical outline of Oregon; List of years in Oregon; 2023 in the United States

The year 2023 in Oregon involved several major events.

Three years after the start of the COVID-19 pandemic and lockdowns, the federal Public Health Emergency for COVID-19 ended, and Oregonians continued to return to in-person work and social gatherings while adjusting to lingering impacts. In November, Portland teachers went on strike for more than three weeks, bringing attention to school funding and education in the post-lockdown era.

The state made national news when Oregon Senate Republicans staged a six-week walkout.

Amid the 2020s anti-LGBTQ movement in the United States, LGBTQ people fled from other states to Oregon for its relatively strong legal protections, although LGBTQ events in the state saw an uptick in vocal opposition, and some were cancelled as a result of harassment and threats.

Natural disasters continued to impact people across the Pacific Northwest. The wildfire season lasted from July to October, aggravated by a heat wave and long-term drought conditions. In December, an atmospheric river caused heavy rainfall and flooding, which knocked out power and resulted in at least two deaths.

== Politics and government ==
=== Incumbents ===
- Governor: Kate Brown (Jan 1–9) Tina Kotek (Jan 9–Dec 31) (Both D)
- Secretary of State: Shemia Fagan (Jan 1–May 8) Cheryl Myers (May 8–June 30) LaVonne Griffin-Valade (June 30–Dec 31) (All D)

== Events ==
- 2023 Oregon wildfires

=== January ===
- January 3 – An arson attack heavily damages the Portland Korean Church.
- January 6 – The Portland Korean Church is demolished.
- January 9 – The 82nd Oregon Legislative Assembly convenes.

=== March ===
- March 20 – A wolverine is sighted near the Columbia River in Portland; this is the first confirmed report of a wolverine outside of the Wallowa Mountains in 30 years.

=== April ===
- April 13 – OHSU researchers publish the largest-ever atlas of human gene mutations.

=== May ===
- May 3 – Oregon Senate Republicans stage a walkout to break quorum, marking the first day of a protest that will last for several weeks. The Republicans say they are protesting bills for not following readability laws, while Democratic House members say the walkout is actually about the contents of the bills.
- May 5 – It is announced that Portland restaurant Castagna will not reopen, about 3 years after it closed due to the COVID-19 pandemic.
- May 12 – 2023 Western North America heat wave: The National Weather Service issues a health advisory for Western Oregon and Washington a day before the heat wave sets in.

=== June ===
- June 2 – 2023 Portland 112
- June 3 – 2023 Pacific Office Automation 147
- June 15
  - The Oregon DMV announces that about 3.5 million Oregonians' license, ID, and permit-related data was accessed by an unidentified hacker during a breach of the state's MOVEit data transfer tool.
  - Democrats and Republicans of the Oregon Legislature make an agreement to end the walkout that started in May.
- June 24 – Oregon City holds their first-ever LGBTQ pride parade.

=== July ===
- July 1 – The Oregon State Fire Marshal becomes a state agency, headquartered in Salem.
- July 2 – Tunnel Five Fire
- July 6 – Alder Creek Fire
- July 10–12 – Drag-a-thon
- July 15 – Flat Fire
- July 15–16 – Portland Pride Waterfront Festival
- July 22 – Golden Fire

=== August ===
- August 4 – The Oregon Department of Fish and Wildlife adopts a Memorandum of Agreement with the Confederated Tribes of the Grand Ronde Community of Oregon. Under the Memorandum, Grand Ronde can issue tribal members licenses for hunting, fishing, shellfishing, and trapping, with annual limits set by mutual agreement between OFW and the Confederated Tribes.
- August 15 – Portland's Frog & Snail closes permanently after the unexpected death of the owner, Chad Bernard.
- August 21 – OHSU researchers publish a study that names a type of iron toxicity-induced cell death as a cause of Alzheimer's disease and vascular dementia.
- August 24–27 – 2023 U.S. Senior Women's Open

=== September ===
- September 3 – 2023 BitNile.com Grand Prix of Portland
- September 12 – Restore Oregon announces that the Jantzen Beach Carousel will be moved out of storage and into the Neon Sign Museum in The Dalles.

=== October ===
- October 14 – A solar eclipse is visible in parts of Oregon; the visibility path starts at Dunes City and passes over Newport, Crater Lake National Park, Eugene, and Medford.
- October 22 – Alaska Airlines Flight 2059

=== November ===
- November 1–26 – 2023 Portland Association of Teachers strike
- November 12 – Retired oceanographer Don Walsh dies at his home in Myrtle Point, at the age of 92.
- November 30 – A team at OHSU successfully performs the first awake spine surgery using local anaesthesia.

=== December ===
- 2023 Pacific Northwest floods
- December 8 – A minor earthquake swarm begins at Mt. Hood.

== See also ==
- 2023 in California
- 2023 in Idaho
- 2023 in Washington (state)
