= Flat Fire (disambiguation) =

Flat Fire may refer to:

- Flat Fire (2023), a wildfire that burned near Agness, Oregon
- Flat Fire (2025), a wildfire that burned near Culver, Oregon
