= Dome Fire (2020) =

2020 wildfire in Southern California

- Part of Part of the August 2020 California lightning siege
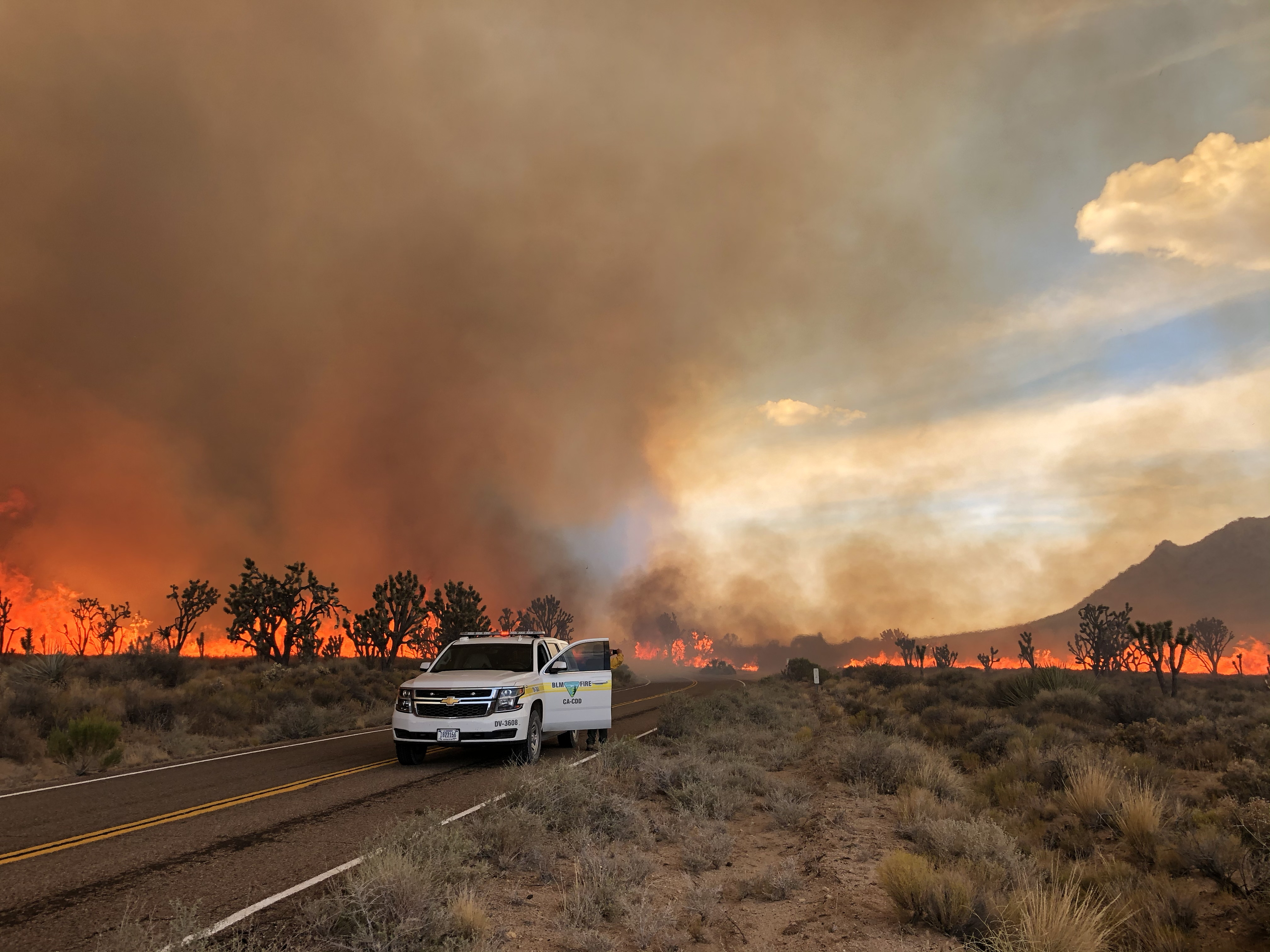
- The Dome Fire burning across Cima Road in Mojave National Preserve on August 16
- Date: August 15 –; August 24, 2020; (10 days)
- Location: San Bernardino County, Southern California, United States
- Coordinates: 35.301°N 115.598°W

Statistics
- Burned area: 43,273 acres (17,512 ha; 68 sq mi; 175 km^{2})

Impacts
- Structures destroyed: 6
- Cost: $2.2 million; (equivalent to about $2.6 million in 2024)

Ignition
- Cause: Lightning

Map
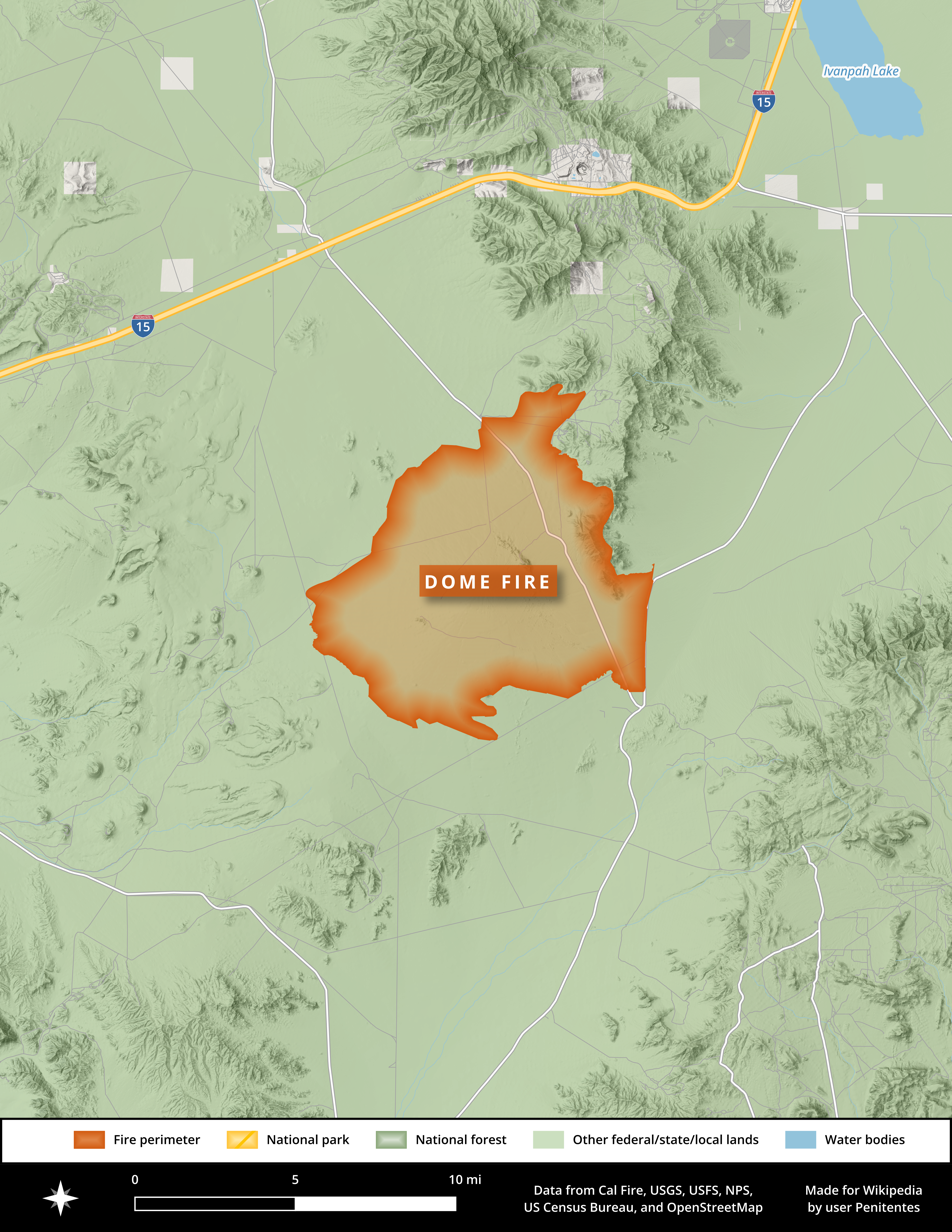
- The area burned in the Dome Fire

- The location of the Dome Fire in Southern California

The location of the fire south of Interstate 15

The 2020 Dome Fire was a large and ecologically destructive wildfire in the Mojave National Preserve in California's San Bernardino County. The fire was ignited by a lightning strike near Cima Dome (for which the fire was named) on August 15 and it grew rapidly over the following 36 hours, aided by weather conditions and a lack of available firefighting resources. During this period the Dome Fire destroyed six structures and burned more than a quarter of the Cima Dome Joshua tree forest, one of the largest and densest known forests, killing as many as 1.3 million Joshua trees. The fire cost $2.2 million to suppress, and it burned 43,273 acres (17,512 ha) before it was fully contained on August 24.

The Dome Fire was one of many large wildfires during the 2020 California wildfire season. The Dome Fire burned at the same time as other higher-priority wildfires in the state, which contributed to the lack of fire suppression resources available for the Dome Fire.

The mass Joshua tree death from the Dome Fire led to concern about the future of the species, which is predicted to face declines in its range due to development and climate change, with its increasing wildfire risk. Wildfires are not unknown in the region; the 2005 Hackberry Complex, also sparked by lightning, burned more than 70,000 acres in the Mojave National Preserve southwest of the Dome Fire footprint. However, fire is not an integral or frequent part of the fragile desert ecosystem, as it is in some other California ecosystems (such as chaparral and coniferous forests) and species like the Joshua tree do not have adaptations to readily protect or recover from wildfires. The ecological ramifications of the Dome Fire are expected to be long-lasting, if not permanent.

== Background ==
Due to a strong high pressure system to California's west, in mid-August temperatures were abnormally hot statewide, including in the High Desert. Relative humidity was low, and an abnormal lack of moisture from the monsoon that summer meant vegetation was even drier than usual. This meant that conditions were already conducive to wildfire growth when a plume of moist and unstable air brought north from the decaying Tropical Storm Fausto off the coast of Baja California interacted with the high pressure system in the desert southwest on August 15 and 16. This led to a dry thunderstorm outbreak across California. Nearly 11,000 cloud-to-ground lightning strikes were recorded, very few accompanied by significant precipitation. The frequent lightning and gusty outflow winds combined with the heat and dry vegetation ignited many quick-spreading fires throughout the state, creating an immediate draw on firefighting resources.

== Progression ==
The Dome Fire began after lightning struck near Deer Spring, an old ranching qanat located on Cima Dome, at approximately 3:22 p.m. PDT on August 15. The Mojave National Preserve fire crew, composed of roughly a dozen personnel, arrived on scene near 5:00 p.m. when the blaze was around 70 acres. The fire, driven by erratic winds, was burning into inaccessible wilderness areas, and passing thunderstorms caused the head of the fire to switch directions rapidly, creating extreme and potentially unsafe conditions for firefighting. The combination of challenging firefighting conditions and the inability to get more firefighting resources meant that the crew was forced to pull back for the night.

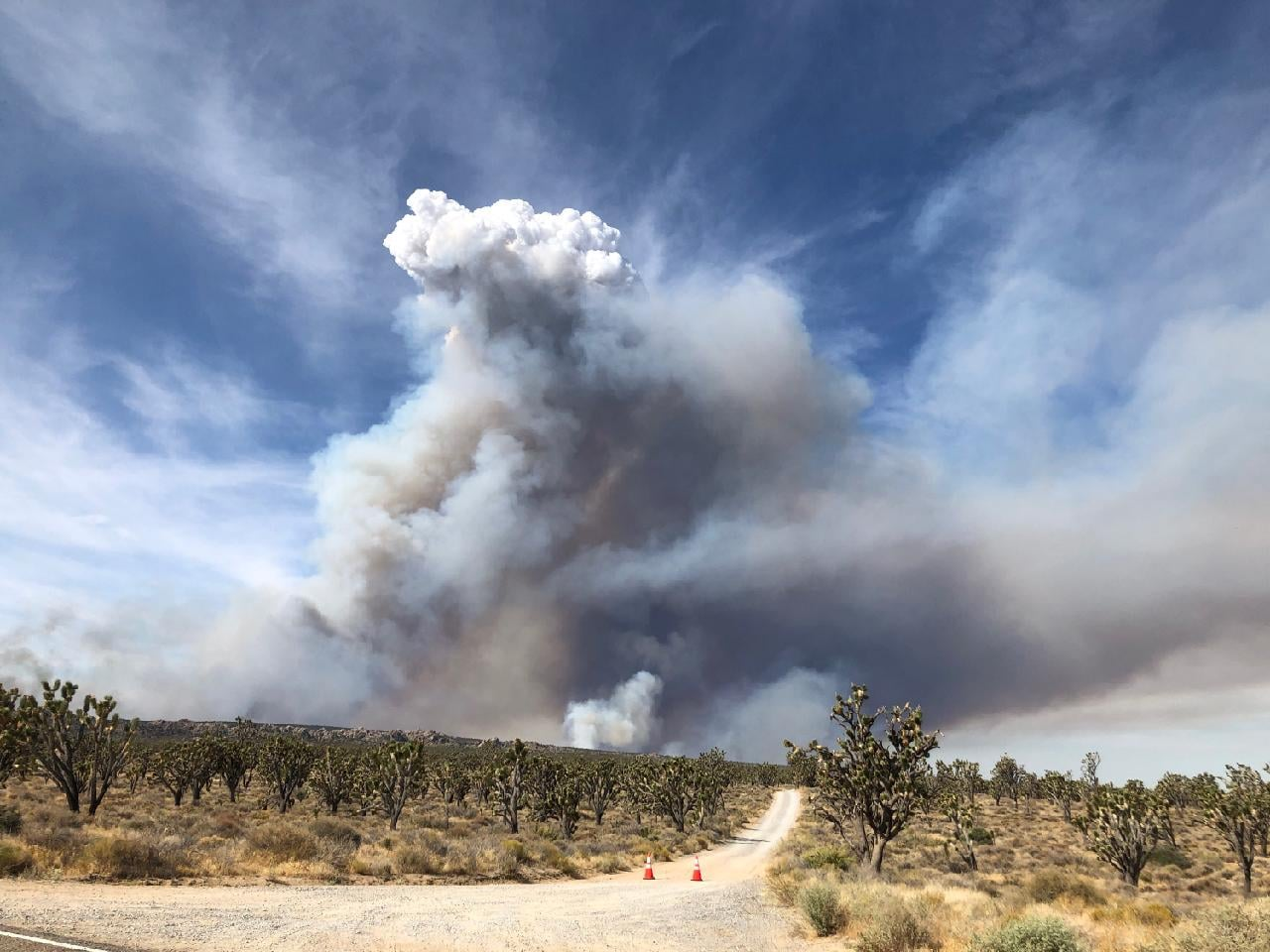
The Dome Fire forming a small pyrocumulus cloud on August 15

By 11:00 a.m. the next morning (August 16), the Dome Fire was more than 16,000 acres. Winds gusted up to 20 miles per hour, and temperatures reached a reported 115 degrees. This made the fire difficult to stop, and it experienced its largest single day of growth, increasing to more than 40,000 acres. During this time it exhibited active fire behavior, including pyrocumulus clouds and fire whirls. More resources finally arrived on the 16th, a team of smokejumpers from Redding, California, a helitanker, and multiple fixed-wing aircraft. One of those included the Boeing 747-400 Global Supertanker. During these first two days, crews also lit backfires—or controlled burns—to stop the Dome Fire's progression to the east, which threatened habitat for the critically endangered desert tortoise.

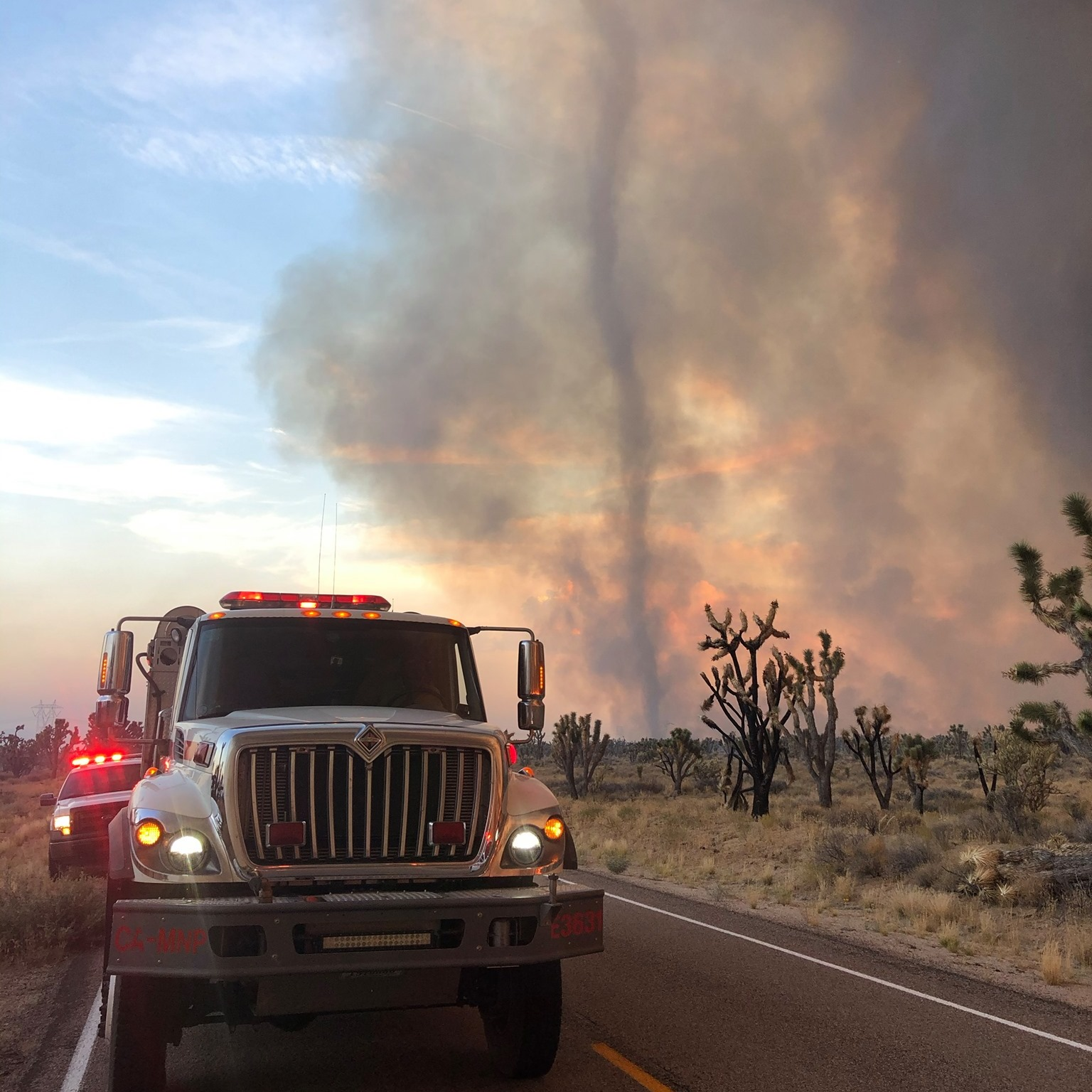
A fire whirl forms in the smoke plume of the Dome Fire on August 16

Conditions made the going difficult. In addition to the wind, temperatures remained extremely high; in the Baker area 20 miles to the west of the fire, temperatures reached a high of 117 degrees on August 17. Another challenging factor was the lack of bulldozers, often used to create a firebreak clear of vegetation so as to stop a fire's spread. The ecologically sensitive nature of the preserve meant much of the firefighting had to be done by hand, with aircraft supporting when available.

In the afternoon of August 17, the fire's management was transferred to a Type 2 incident management team, which was able to requisition more personnel and resources. Eight aircraft continued to drop water and fire retardant to halt the fire's spread, which also slowed as it encountered rockier areas with sparser vegetation. During the peak of the suppression and mop-up effort, more than 180 firefighters were assigned to the Dome Fire.

On August 20, up to 0.5 inches of rain fell over the burn area, further helping the firefight, and on August 24, the Dome Fire was declared 100% contained. The fire's advance was stopped at Morning Star Mine Road to the east, Powerline Road to the south, near Aiken Mine Road to the west, and near the intersection of Cima Road and Zinc Mine Road south of Striped Mountain to the north.

== Effects ==
Trails and facilities in the immediate of the area were closed for safety, including the Teutonia Peak Trail, multiple primitive campsites, visitor's centers, pit toilets, and the Lava Tube. The fire's smoke plume drifted over Interstate 15 to the north, but remained aloft and did not impair visibility.

The fire burned in an unpopulated area, but destroyed multiple structures dating back to the Rock Springs Land and Cattle Company ranching operation in the late 19th century, then the second-largest in California. Historic structures that burned included Kessler Springs Historical Ranch House, bunkhouses at Kessler Springs Ranch and Valley View Ranch, and numerous water tanks, troughs, corrals, and other outbuildings. Historic mining operations, such as the Morning Star Mine and Evening Star Mine, were threatened but ultimately spared.

=== Ecological ===
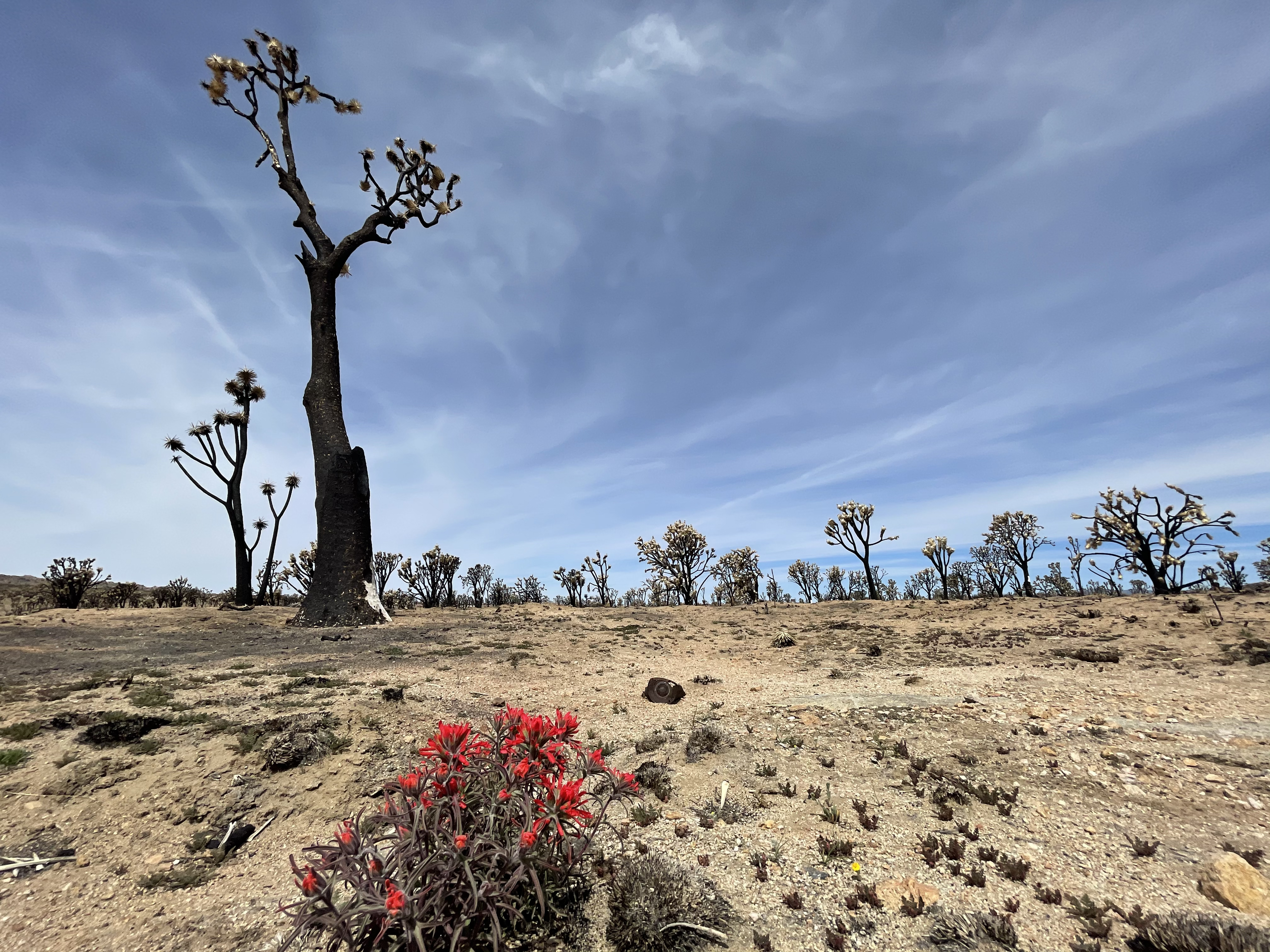
Burned Joshua trees 8 months after the Dome Fire

After the Dome Fire 1.33 million Joshua trees were estimated burned, and of those, less than 200,000 were showing green leaves (meaning a possibility of survival). Scientists affiliated with the Mojave National Preserve attributed much of the intensity of the fire to an increased fuel load; the Cima Dome Joshua tree forest is one of the densest Joshua tree forests in the world. Preserve scientists suspect this was the result of cattle grazing until the establishment of the preserve in the 1990s. Cattle may have grazed on many other plants but let flammable blackbrush alone, which shielded many Joshua tree seedlings. The eventual combination of blackbrush, flammable invasive species like red brome, and dense Joshua tree stands led to a wildfire-receptive ecology.

The death of so many Joshua trees, which are native only to the southwestern United States, led to concern about the species' vulnerability to climate change and other pressures. Joshua trees are split into two varieties—an eastern and a western—and while the Cima Dome population was of the less-threatened eastern kind, the western species was, at the time, a candidate for threatened status under the California Endangered Species Act, though it did not ultimately become listed as such.

The Mojave National Preserve's lead wildlife biologist estimated that small animal mortality had been low, under 20% for small reptile and mammal species such as snakes, lizards, and rabbits. The Dome Fire also burned in areas considered habitat for the desert tortoise, a critically endangered species, but "no direct tortoise mortality" was found during or after the fire in surveys, and total mortality was estimated at "perhaps a dozen individuals."

== Recovery ==
The majority of the Dome Fire footprint burned at a moderate severity, leaving intact the root systems of many native shrubs and grasses. However, the Mojave National Preserve landscape is not a fire succession landscape, meaning that desert plants are poorly adapted to surviving wildfire, and the ecosystem is not necessarily expected to recover on its own and may convert to a different ecosystem type. Preserve scientists and botanists involved in the restoration and recovery effort are concerned about the possible post-fire takeover of invasive species like red brome, which are flammable and could lead to recurring wildfires. Restoration is mainly focused on the eradication of these invasive species and the small-scale planting of new Joshua tree seedlings.

Replanting efforts took place in the winter of 2021 and are planned to continue through 2023, relying on volunteer planting, watering, and reporting programs organized by the National Park Service. According to the National Park Service, "Joshua trees have poor seed dispersal and may only migrate about 100 feet for every 20 years," making these projects critical for the long-term recovery of the species in the Cima Dome region. Additionally, Cima Dome has been modelled as a climate refugia for Joshua trees, making their existence there important for the long-term health of the species.

== See also ==
- York Fire – 2023 wildfire that began in Mojave National Preserve
