= Newell Road Fire =

2023 wildfire near Roosevelt, Washington

- Part of the 2023 Washington wildfires
- Date: July 21, 2023 – July 29, 2023
- Location: Near Roosevelt, Washington, U.S.
- Coordinates: 45°49′50″N 120°27′32″W

Statistics
- Burned area: 60,551 acres (24,504 ha)

Impacts
- Structures lost: Many homes and structures, exact number being assessed

Ignition
- Cause: Under investigation

Map
- Perimeter of Newell Road Fire (map data)
- The fire's location in southern Washington

The Newell Road Fire was a wildfire in Klickitat County, Washington, United States. The fire began near Roosevelt at about 3:20 pm Pacific Time on July 21, 2023 and burned 60,551 acres (24,504 ha). It was 100% contained on July 29, 2023. The cause of the fire is unknown.

== History ==
The fire began near Roosevelt, Washington at around 3:20 pm PT on July 21, 2023. From July 26 to July 28, it was the largest wildfire in the United States of the 2023 US wildfire season. On July 29, 2023 the York Fire surpassed the Newell Road Fire as the largest wildfire of that same wildfire season.

On July 29, the fire was 100% contained after it had burned 60,551 acres (24,504 ha).

== Cause ==
The cause of the fire is unknown and under investigation.

== Impact ==
A total of 173 single residences, 11 multiple residents, 86 commercial properties and 54 structures were threatened by the fire. Many homes and structures were destroyed by the fire. The exact number destroyed is under assessment.

=== Closures and evacuations ===
Level 3 Evacuations were issued for areas near the fire, including parts of Old Highway 8 adjacent to the Columbia River along part of the Washington–Oregon state border. Roosevelt Grade Road, Middle Road, Old Highway 8 north to and including Dot Road were closed due to the fire. A 70-mile stretch of State Route 14 was closed between US Route 97 and State Route 221. The Red Cross opened a shelter for people affected by the fire at Goldendale Middle School in Goldendale, Washington. A shelter for animals was also set up at the Klickitat County Fairgrounds.

On July 24, 2023, the state government's request to the Federal Emergency Management Agency (FEMA) for a Fire Management Assistance Grant was approved. The grant is intended to help with various firefighting costs.
