= Deep Fire =

2023 wildfire in California

- Part of the 2023 California wildfires
- Smoke plume from the fire, as seen on August 21
- Date: August 15, 2023 –; October 2, 2023
- Location: Trinity, California

Statistics
- Burned area: 4,198 acres (1,699 ha)

Impacts
- Deaths: 0
- Injuries: 2 firefighters
- Structures destroyed: 0

Ignition
- Cause: Lightning

The 2023 Deep Fire was a wildfire that burned through Trinity County, California from August 15 to October 2. It was sparked by a lightning strike, and was the 10th-biggest fire to ignite during the 2023 California wildfire season.

== Progression ==
The fire started as a result of a lightning strike at 7:00 AM PDT on August 15, and by August 19 had reached 3,000 acres (1,200 hectares) in size. The forest in which the fire was burning in was also closed around the same time. Later in the day, one firefighter was injured as a direct result of the fire. Throughout the night the fire further grew, covering 3,573 acres (1,446 hectares) by the morning of August 20. Crews worked to build fire lines on the fire's northern boundary and western boundary to prevent its crossing over the Stuart Fork Trail.

On August 21, the fire had reached 3,573 acres (1,446 hectares) in size, and fire crews continued to build fire lines on the western edge of the fire. On August 22, containment on the fire reached 5% for the first time, and the fire grew by around 300 acres. By August 23, containment reached 16%, and crews continued to work, primarily on its southern boundary. Containment was rapidly achieved into the night of August 24, and by the morning the fire had been 51% contained. The fire slowly grew in size through August 25, and on August 26 reached 3,833 acres (1,551 hectares) in land coverage.

The fire grew 5 acres on August 27, and containment was retained at 58%. By August 29, the fire had reached 3,924 acres (1,588 hectares) in size, and containment reached 60%. The fire grew by 200 acres on August 30, and crews worked to limit the fire's growth on its northern edge. The fire had little-to-no growth and containment remained steady until September 10, when containment on the fire reached 77%. On October 2, containment on the fire had reached 100%.

== See also ==
- Rabbit Fire (2023)
