= 2023 Pacific Northwest floods =

Flood in the United States

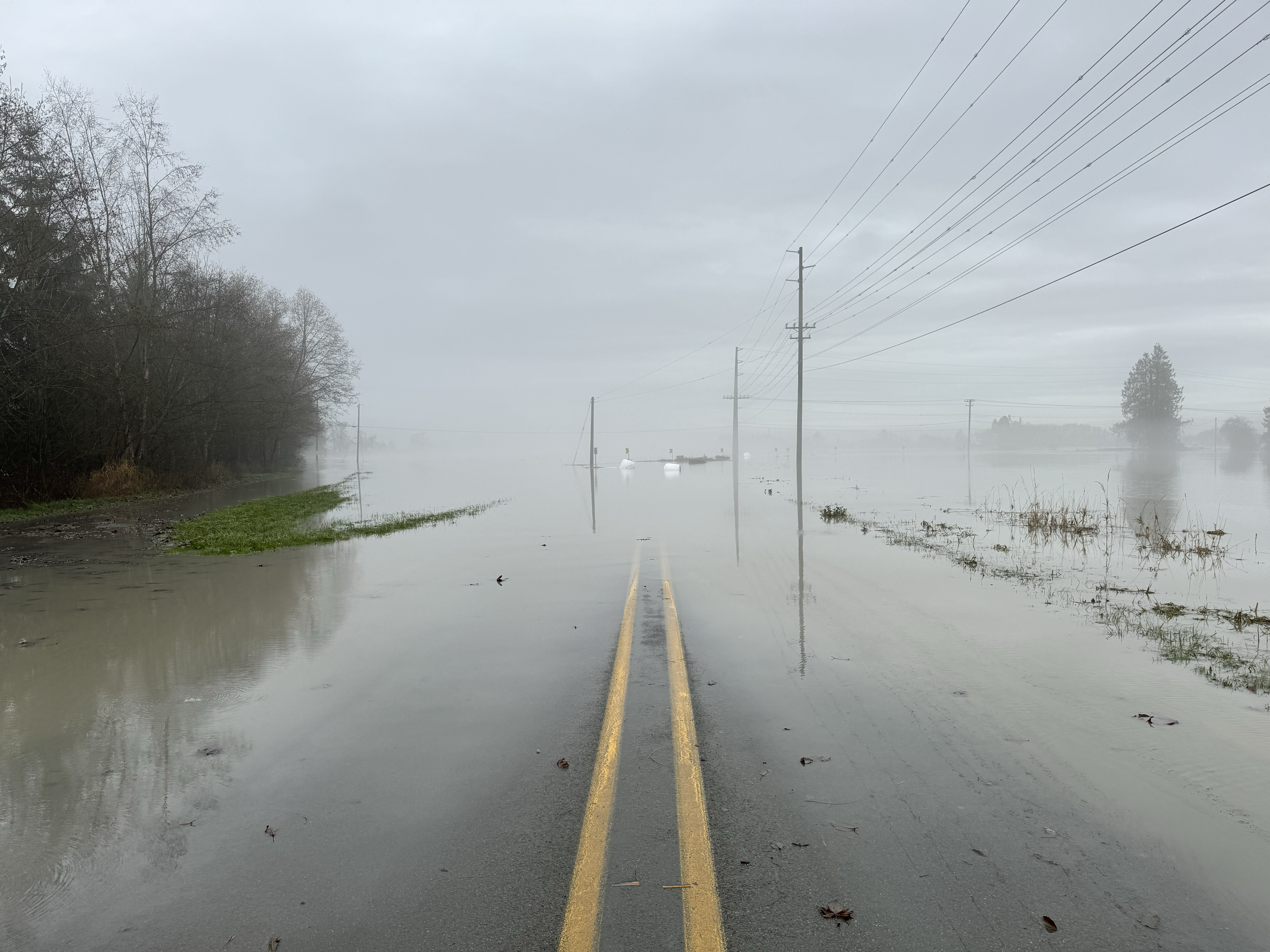
- Marine Drive south of Stanwood, Washington, flooded by the Stillaguamish River

Overall effects
- Fatalities: 2

In December 2023, an atmospheric river caused flooding in the Pacific Northwest. Rainfall and temperature records were set in the U.S. state of Washington. Two deaths have been attributed to this flood. One person died in Portland.

== Oregon ==
The Oregon Coast saw highway and school closures, and Cape Lookout State Park closed as well.

== Washington ==
A mudslide south of Kelso caused Amtrak to suspend passenger rail service on the Cascades and Coast Starlight between Seattle and Portland, Oregon.

The Stillaguamish River in Snohomish County reached 21.34 feet (6.50 m) at Arlington, setting a new record high. The river inundated the community of Silvana and cut off portions of State Route 530. Local teams made 13 rescues along the Stillaguamish River and responded to several other calls for stranded people cut off by the Skykomish River in Monroe.

== See also ==
- 2023 in Oregon
- List of floods
