= 2023 California wildfires =

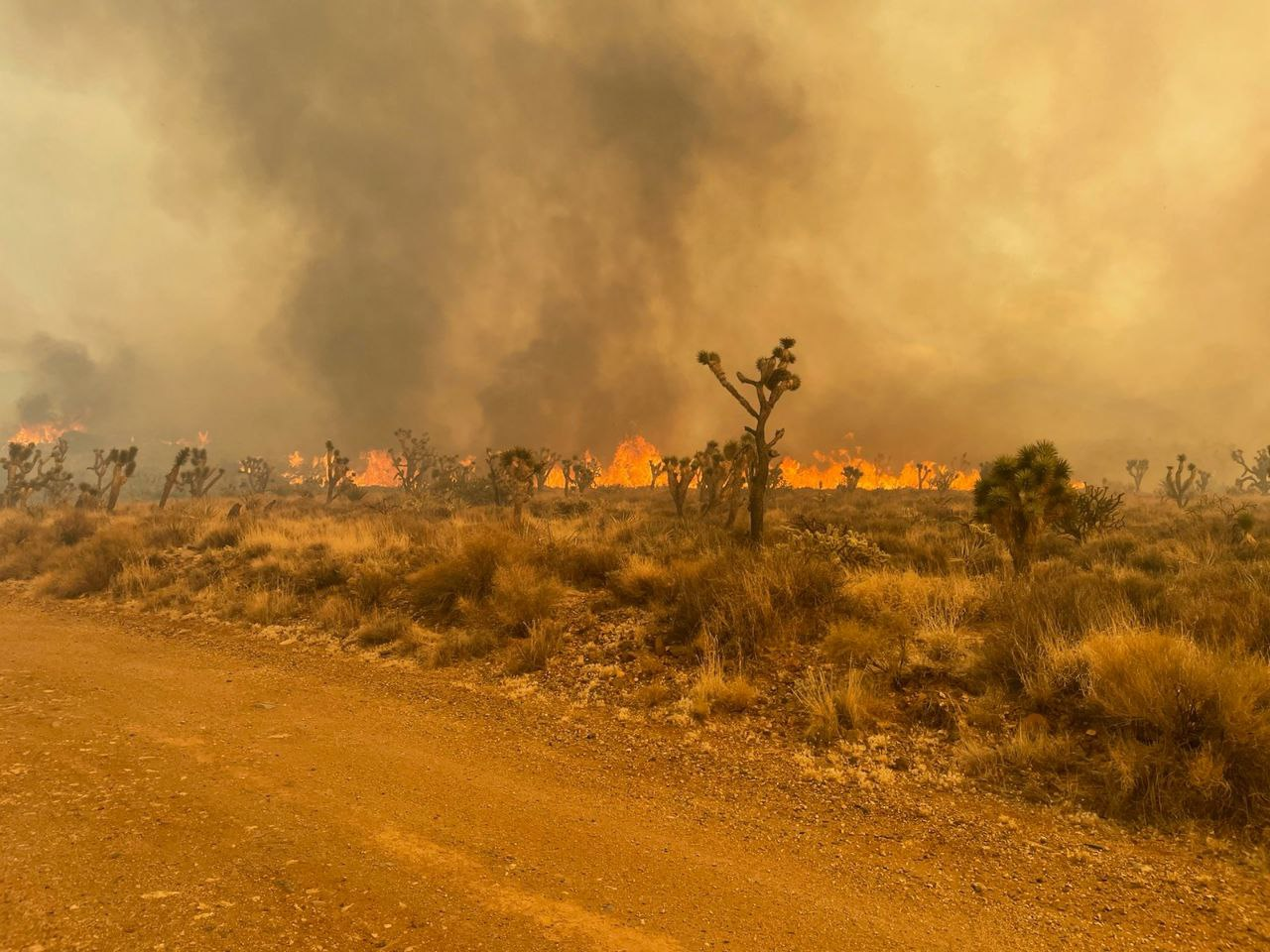
- The York Fire burns in Mojave National Preserve on July 29

Statistics
- Total fires: 7,386
- Total area: 332,822 acres (134,688 ha)

Impacts
- Deaths: 4; (1 civilian, 3 firefighter)
- Structures destroyed: 58 (13 damaged)

Map
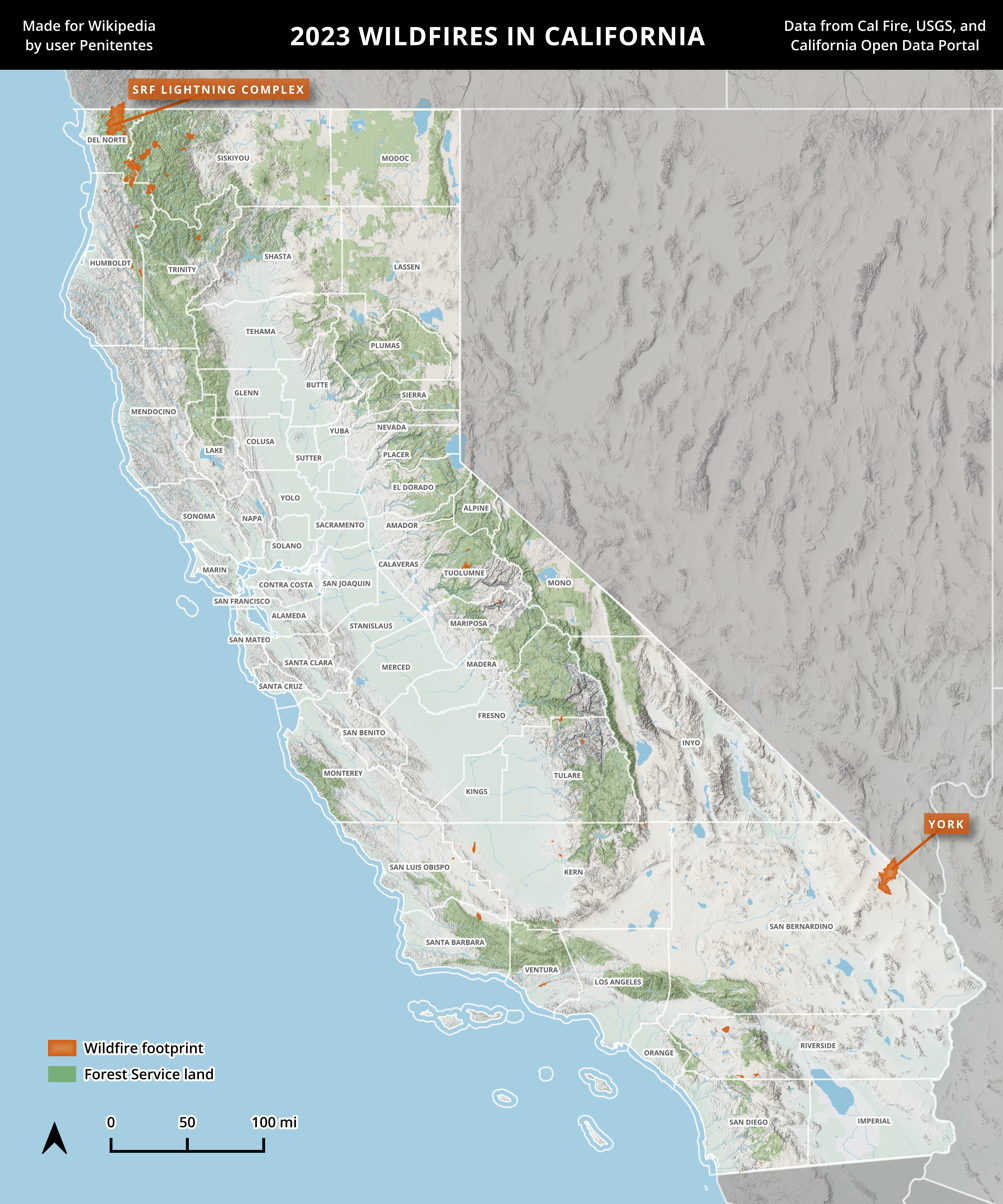
- A map of wildfires in California in 2023, using Cal Fire data

According to statistics published by the California Department of Forestry and Fire Protection (Cal Fire), a total of 7,386 wildfires burned a total of 332,822 acres (134,688 hectares) in the U.S. state of California in 2023. This was below the state's five-year average of 1,722,059 acres (696,893 ha) burned during the same period. The 2023 fire season followed the 2022 season, during which the number of fires and the resulting burned acreage were both below average. Four fatalities were reported during the 2023 fire season.

== Background ==
The timing of "fire season" in California is variable, depending on the amount of prior winter and spring precipitation, the frequency and severity of weather such as heat waves and wind events, and moisture content in vegetation. Northern California typically sees wildfire activity between late spring and early fall, peaking in the summer with hotter and drier conditions. Occasional cold frontal passages can bring wind and lightning. The timing of fire season in Southern California is similar, peaking between late spring and fall. The severity and duration of peak activity in either part of the state is modulated in part by weather events: downslope/offshore wind events can lead to critical fire weather, while onshore flow and Pacific weather systems can bring conditions that hamper wildfire growth.

== Season outlook ==
=== Climate ===
California saw a series of powerful atmospheric rivers between December 2022 and March 2023, which much improved drought conditions in the state and boosted the snowpack in the Sierra Nevada to more than 200% of average for the date. Some researchers noted that the resulting vegetation growth could prove dangerous if dry and warm conditions return during spring and summer, obviating the gains from early storms, but in general, according to the California Department of Forestry and Fire Protection (Cal Fire), increased precipitation reduces the risk of a worse wildfire season.

Cal Fire predicted that "critically dry fuel moisture alignments are not likely to be reached for any great length of time or over a larger area" between March and June 2023. Critical fuel moisture refers to the point at which fuel characteristics—like vegetation mortality or dryness—are favorable for large fire growth.

==== Timing of peak fire season ====
In Northern California, fire season typically peaks in the summer with increasingly warm and dry conditions and aided by occasional dry cold frontal passages that may bring winds and/or lightning. Activity usually continues until late fall brings Pacific moisture to the northern portion of the state, though northeast wind events may pose a threat. In Southern California, fire season typically peaks in late spring through early fall, when Pacific moisture recedes. Offshore wind events such as Santa Ana winds mean that large fires are possible year-round, but their frequency is most heightened in the fall, when fuels are also driest.

=== Preparation ===
In January, U.S. Agriculture Secretary Tom Vilsack announced the allocation of $930 million in funding from the Infrastructure Investment and Jobs Act and the Inflation Reduction Act to 10 western states, including California, for fuel reduction programs and other measures to curtail wildfire risks. The allocation was reported to represent a significant increase in funding for programs like tree clearing, brush thinning and removal, and controlled burns in Southern California, whose four National Forests previously received about $1.2 million annually for those purposes.

On January 31, California senators Dianne Feinstein and Alex Padilla (as well as senators Steve Daines of Montana and Ron Wyden of Oregon) introduced a bill to the U.S. Senate entitled the Wildfire Emergency Act, recognizing the "threat of wildfire" as an emergency in the Western United States. The proposed bill would provide at least a quarter of a billion dollars in funding for forest restoration and wildfire resilience in 20 locations of more than 100,000 acres (40,000 ha) each, coordinated by the Forest Service. It would also create a program at the Department of Energy to "ensure that critical facilities remain active during wildfire disruptions". Further funding would be provided for prescribed fire implementation, firefighter training, and wildfire detection.

On March 20, Vice President Kamala Harris announced $197 million in federal grants through the administration’s wildfire defense grant program. California-based authorities and organizations were slated to receive 29 grants; they include money for counties to conduct home defensible space inspections, prescribed burn training, and fuels reductions, as well as increased funding for U.S. Forest Service and Department of Interior wildfire prevention efforts.

== Impacts ==
=== Casualties ===
While fighting the three-acre (1.2 ha) Broadway Fire near Cabazon in Riverside County on August 6, two helicopters (a Bell 407 and a Sikorsky S-64E) collided in mid-air. The Sikorsky helicopter landed safely, while all three occupants of the Bell helicopter—a contract pilot, a Cal Fire division chief, and a Cal Fire captain—were killed. The National Transportation Safety Board (NTSB) will investigate the accident. The state of California reported four fatalities during the 2023 fire season, including three firefighters and one civilian.

== List of wildfires ==
The following is a list of fires that have burned more than 1,000 acres (400 hectares), produced significant structural damage or casualties, or otherwise been notable. Acreage and containment figures may not be up to date.

Name	County	Acres	Start date	Containment date (Note: Containment means that fire crews have established and secured control lines around the fire's perimeter. These lines are artificial barriers, like trenches or cleared vegetation, designed to stop the fire's spread, or natural barriers like rivers. Containment reflects progress in managing the fire but does not necessarily mean the fire is starved of fuel, under control, or put out.)	Notes	Refs
Danny	Los Angeles	1,560	June 4	June 5	Unknown cause.	
Geology	Riverside	1,088	June 10	June 18	Cause under investigation, burned in Joshua Tree National Park.	
Bone	Tuolumne	1,163	June 15	July 10	Caused by lightning in the area of a Stanislaus National Forest planned prescribed burn, the fire was managed for resource objectives.	
District	Kern	1,044	July 7	July 10	Caused by a semi truck fire. Adjacent to Interstate 5, caused closures of the freeway's northbound lanes.	
Rabbit	Riverside	8,283	July 14	July 22	Cause under investigation, burned near Lakeview and Beaumont. Caused evacuation warnings and orders. Burned one person and closed parts of State Route 79.	
Bonny	Riverside	2,322	July 27	August 9	Cause under investigation. Caused evacuation warnings and orders. 1 structure destroyed.	
York	San Bernardino, Clark (NV)	93,078	July 28	August 19	Cause undetermined. Burned largely in Mojave National Preserve in California; burned 9,127 acres (3,694 ha) in Nevada. 3 structures destroyed.	
East	Kern	1,540	August 1	August 2	Cause under investigation.	
No Name	Kern	1,120	August 5	August 8	Cause under investigation.	
Almond	Kern	5,229	August 6	August 7	Cause under investigation.	
South Fork Complex	Humboldt	3,929	August 15	November 1	Caused by lightning. Consisted of the 3-9, Sulfur, Pellitreau, and Pilot fires.	
SRF Lightning Complex	Humboldt	50,198	August 15	October 27	Caused by lightning. Consisted of the Lone Pine, Pearch, Mosquito, Blue Creek, Blue Creek 2, Bluff #1, Let-er-buck, Hancock, Iron, Lost, Devil, and Glenn fires.	
Deep	Trinity	4,198	August 15	October 2	Caused by lightning.	
Smith River Complex	Del Norte, Curry (OR), Josephine (OR)	95,107	August 15	November 17	Caused by lightning. Consisted of the Holiday, Diamond, Kelly, and Prescott fires, as well as many smaller fires.	
Happy Camp Complex	Siskiyou	21,725	August 15	October 23	Caused by lightning. Consisted of the Head, Canyon, Elliot, and Three Creeks fires, as well as many smaller fires. Nine structures destroyed/damaged.	
Redwood	Tulare	2,248	August 15		Caused by lightning. Burned in Sequoia National Park; managed by the park with a "confine and contain" strategy.	
Plant	Santa Barbara	5,464	August 19	August 22	Cause under investigation.	
Quarry	Tuolumne	9,130	September 9	November 15	Caused by lightning.	
Rabbit	Tulare	2,856	September 30	November 14	Caused by lightning.	
Highland	Riverside	2,487	October 30	November 6	Cause under investigation.	
Canyon	San Diego	7,000	October 30	November 8	Cause under investigation. Burned on Camp Pendleton.	
South	Ventura	2,715	December 9	December 12		

== See also ==
- List of California wildfires
- 2023 Arizona wildfires
- 2023 New Mexico wildfires
- 2023 Oregon wildfires
