= Roosevelt, Washington =

- Census-designated place
- Location of Roosevelt in Klickitat County, Washington
- Coordinates: 45°44′41″N 120°13′10″W
- Country: United States
- State: Washington
- County: Klickitat

Area
  - Total: 3.79 sq mi (9.81 km^{2})
  - Land: 3.79 sq mi (9.81 km^{2})
  - Water: 0 sq mi (0.0 km^{2})
- Elevation: 381 ft (116 m)

Population (2020)
  - Total: 152
  - Density: 40.1/sq mi (15.5/km^{2})
- Time zone: UTC-8 (Pacific (PST))
  - Summer (DST): UTC-7 (PDT)
- ZIP code: 99356
- Area code: 509
- FIPS code: 53-59705
- GNIS feature ID: 2409207

Roosevelt is an unincorporated community and census-designated place (CDP) in Klickitat County, Washington, United States. The population was 152 at the 2020 census. The Roosevelt Regional Landfill, one of the largest landfills in the United States, is located at Roosevelt.

The community was named after President Theodore Roosevelt.

== Geography ==
Roosevelt is in southeastern Klickitat County on the north bank of the Columbia River, sitting across from Arlington, Oregon. State Route 14 runs through the community, traveling 34 miles (55 km) east to Paterson and 32 miles (51 km) west to Maryhill.

According to the United States Census Bureau, the CDP has a total area of 3.8 square miles (9.8 km^{2}), all of it land.

=== Climate ===
This region experiences warm (but not hot) and dry summers, with no average monthly temperatures above 71.6 °F (22.0 °C). According to the Köppen Climate Classification system, Roosevelt has a warm-summer Mediterranean climate, abbreviated "Csb" on climate maps.

== Demographics ==
Historical population
Census	Pop.	Note	%±
2000	79		—
2010	156		97.5%
2020	152		−2.6%
U.S. Decennial Census; 1990 2000 2010 2020

Roosevelt first appeared as a census designated place in the 2000 U.S. census.

=== Racial and ethnic composition ===
Roosevelt CDP, Washington – Racial and ethnic composition Note: the US Census treats Hispanic/Latino as an ethnic category. This table excludes Latinos from the racial categories and assigns them to a separate category. Hispanics/Latinos may be of any race.
Race / Ethnicity (NH = Non-Hispanic)	Pop 2000	Pop 2010	Pop 2020	% 2000	% 2010	% 2020
White alone (NH)	65	71	75	82.28%	45.51%	49.34%
Black or African American alone (NH)	0	0	0	0.00%	0.00%	0.00%
Native American or Alaska Native alone (NH)	0	1	0	0.00%	0.64%	0.00%
Asian alone (NH)	0	0	0	0.00%	0.00%	0.00%
Native Hawaiian or Pacific Islander alone (NH)	0	0	0	0.00%	0.00%	0.00%
Other race alone (NH)	0	0	0	0.00%	0.00%	0.00%
Mixed race or Multiracial (NH)	1	3	0	1.27%	1.92%	0.00%
Hispanic or Latino (any race)	13	81	77	16.46%	51.92%	50.66%
Total	79	156	152	100.00%	100.00%	100.00%

=== 2000 census ===
As of the census of 2000, there were 79 people, 33 households, and 20 families residing in the CDP. The population density was 20.5 people per square mile (7.9/km^{2}). There were 46 housing units at an average density of 11.9/sq mi (4.6/km^{2}). The racial makeup of the CDP was 82.28% White, 16.46% from other races, and 1.27% from two or more races. Hispanic or Latino of any race were 16.46% of the population.

There were 33 households, out of which 27.3% had children under the age of 18 living with them, 54.5% were married couples living together, and 36.4% were non-families. 36.4% of all households were made up of individuals, and 12.1% had someone living alone who was 65 years of age or older. The average household size was 2.39 and the average family size was 3.10.

In the CDP, the population was spread out, with 24.1% under the age of 18, 8.9% from 18 to 24, 15.2% from 25 to 44, 35.4% from 45 to 64, and 16.5% who were 65 years of age or older. The median age was 45 years. For every 100 females, there were 154.8 males. For every 100 females age 18 and over, there were 114.3 males.

The median income for a household in the CDP was $45,694, and the median income for a family was $46,250. Males had a median income of $38,750 versus $0 for females. The per capita income for the CDP was $11,083. None of the population or families were below the poverty line.
