= York Fire =

2023 wildfire in California and Nevada

- Part of the 2023 California wildfires
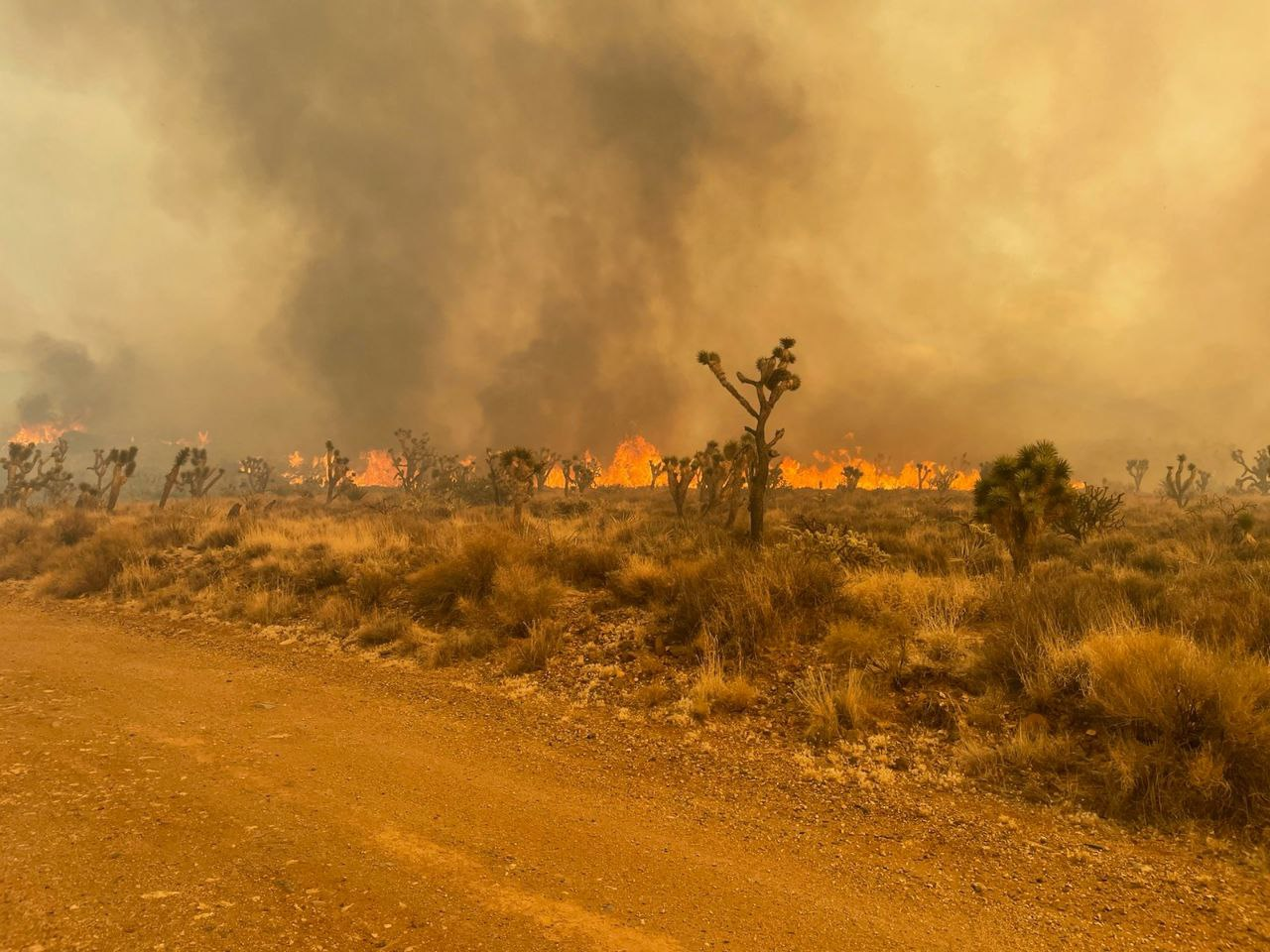
- The York Fire burns among Joshua trees and brush on July 29
- Date: July 28, 2023 –; August 19, 2023
- Location: San Bernardino County, California & Clark County, Nevada
- Coordinates: 35°11′30.8″N 115°19′2.6″W

Statistics
- Burned area: 93,078 acres (37,667 ha)

Impacts
- Structures lost: 3

Ignition
- Cause: Undetermined

Map
- Perimeter of York Fire (map data)
- The fire's location in southern California

The York Fire was a large wildfire in the Mojave National Preserve in San Bernardino County, California, and in Clark County, Nevada. The fire burned 93,078 acres (37,667 ha). The cause of the fire is undetermined.

== Background ==
The Mojave National Preserve saw increased fire frequency in the decade preceding the York Fire, with increasing numbers of invasive grasses in the Mojave and Colorado deserts. California's wet winter of 2022–2023 was another contributing factor, helping load the desert with brush that became fuel for the York Fire. The last major fire in the Preserve was the lightning-ignited Dome Fire in 2020, which burned 43,273 acres (17,512 ha) and killed more than a million Joshua trees.

== Progression ==
=== July ===
The fire began on July 28, 2023, on private land, near the New York Mountains within the Mojave National Preserve in eastern San Bernardino County. It was first observed burning in the area of Caruthers Canyon. By the morning of July 29, after burning actively in the night, the fire had burned a total of 4,200 acres (1,700 ha). Weather conditions were uncooperative for firefighters: breezes out of the south and southwest helped push the fire northeast, and occasional showers and thunderstorms nearby generated sudden and erratic winds. This enabled the fire's rapid spread northward: by the evening of July 29th, the fire was estimated to have burned approximately 30,000 acres (12,000 ha), remaining at 0% containment.

The following morning, on July 29, the fire was mapped at more than 68,000 acres (28,000 ha), becoming the largest wildfire of the year in the United States (surpassing the Newell Road Fire in Washington). At approximately 3:30 p.m. on July 30, the fire burned across the Nevada state line into Clark County, burning an unknown number of acres within Avi Kwa Ame National Monument. Firefighting was complicated by restrictions on ecologically-damaging tactics, such as using bulldozers to scrape firebreaks.

== Effects ==
=== Closures ===
Closures were in place for multiple roads and campgrounds in the Preserve. Sections of State Route 164 and U.S. Route 95 in Nevada were temporarily closed because of hazardous driving conditions from the fire on July 30.

=== Damage ===
The York Fire destroyed three structures in Caruthers Canyon on July 28, including the Kousch House, an unoccupied dwelling owned by the National Park Service. The building was eligible for, but not listed on, the National Register of Historic Places.

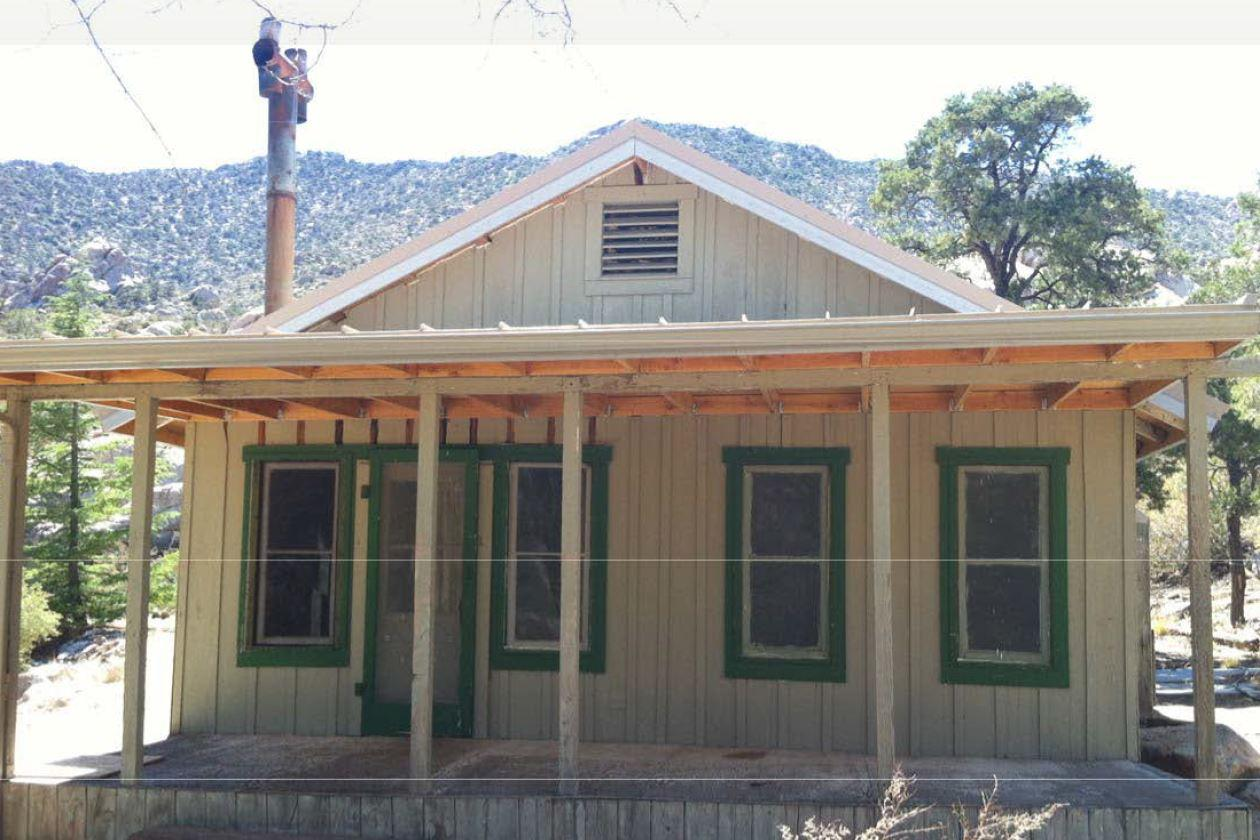
The Kousch House before it was destroyed by the fire
