= 2023 Florida wildfires =

Natural disasters in the USA

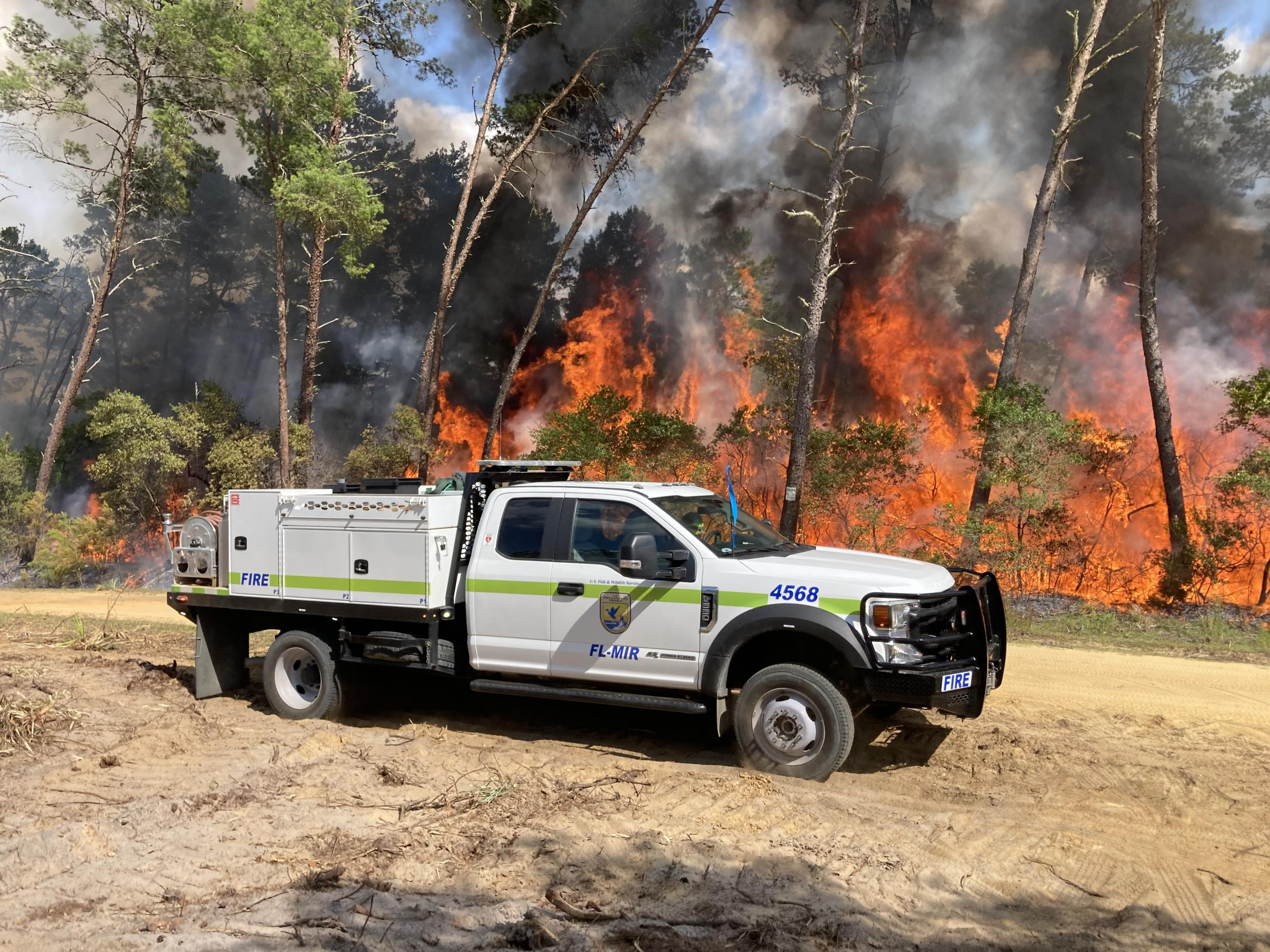
- A fire truck during the Major Fire, 2023

Map
- Map of 2023 Florida wildfires (map data)

The 2023 Florida wildfire season was a series of wildfires that burned throughout the U.S. state of Florida. As of December 3, there were a total of 2,656 wildfires, burning 101,188 acres (158.106 sq mi) across the state.

== Meteorological synopsis ==
A number of factors contributed to the wildfire season, including a La Niña event, which limited rainfall, dry brush, and effects stemming from Hurricane Ian that made landfall in southwest Florida in 2022. In January 2023, the National Interagency Fire Center issued a fire potential outlook which concerned areas across northern Florida and southeastern Georgia to be at above-normal levels for significant wildland fire potential. During 2023, several major cities, including Jacksonville, Miami, Orlando, and Tampa, received below-normal precipitation, and 87 percent of the state were at abnormally dry condition levels. In February, Naples received no measurable precipitation, and the following month, only 0.84 inches (21 mm) of rain fell in Marco Island, while 0.30 inches (7.6 mm) of rain fell at Naples Municipal Airport, which resulted in a burn ban in Collier County on March 4 and the designation of an extreme drought across Collier County on March 28 by the United States Drought Monitor. Red flag warnings were issued across portions of the state in May, with several counties also issuing burn bans or prohibiting burning yard debris.

== List of wildfires ==
The following is a list of fires that burned more than 1,000 acres (400 ha), or produced significant structural damage or casualties.

Name	County	Acres	Start date	Containment date (Note: Containment means that fire crews have established and secured control lines around the fire's perimeter. These lines are artificial barriers, like trenches or cleared vegetation, designed to stop the fire's spread, or natural barriers like rivers. Containment reflects progress in managing the fire but does not necessarily mean the fire is starved of fuel, under control, or put out.)	Notes	Ref
Mile 31	Broward	13,500	March 12	March 16	Smoke stemming from the wildfire caused low visibility on U.S. Route 27, ultimately closing a 40-mile stretch of the highway.	
Cypress Camp Trail	Collier	9,749	April 4	April 10		
County Road 121	Nassau	1,053	April 20	2023	Caused by a vehicle fire northwest of Bryceville.	
Major	Marion and Lake	4,952	April 27	June 7		
Sandy	Collier	19,814	May 1	May 18	Started by a lightning strike at Big Cypress National Preserve.	

=== Notable fires ===
==== Sandy Fire ====
On May 1, a lightning strike started a wildfire in southeastern Big Cypress National Preserve, forcing closures and evacuations north of Interstate 75. The wildfire then grew to 8,400 acres (13.1 sq mi) by May 7, and 10,000 acres (16 sq mi) by the next day, as did the containment of the fire, which increased to 5%. Evacuation plans were then implemented on May 11 in Ochopee as the wildfire grew to more than 11,000 acres (17 sq mi), also being 20% contained. The next day, a portion of U.S. Route 41 was closed as the fire moved towards the highway, and a travel advisory was also issued in portions of Collier and Dade counties as a result of poor visibility from smoke stemming from the wildfire. The wildfire also grew to 15,130 acres (23.64 sq mi) and was 30% contained on May 12. On May 14, the wildfire continued to spread, burning 19,814 acres (30.959 sq mi) in Big Cypress National Preserve, before being fully contained two days later.
