= Portland Korean Church =

Former church in Portland, Oregon, U.S.

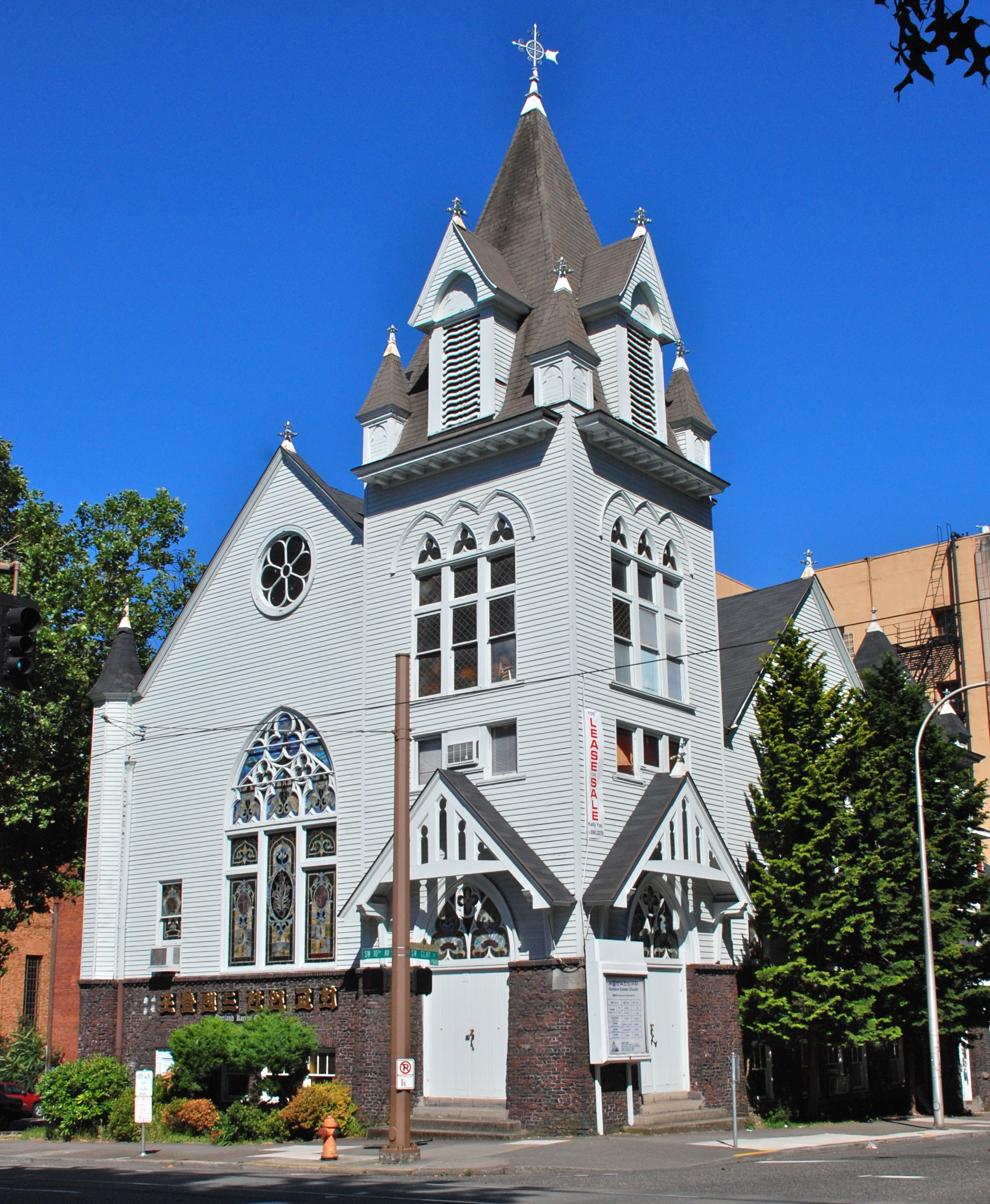
- Portland Korean Church
- 45°30′53″N 122°41′4.5″W
- Location: Portland, Oregon
- Country: United States

History
- Former names: First German Evangelical Church; First Evangelical Church

Architecture
- Architectural type: Gothic
- Completed: 1905
- Demolished: 2023

The Portland Korean Church was a historic Gothic-style church building in Portland, Oregon, United States. The structure was built in 1905 and originally known as the First German Evangelical Church.

In the 1970s, the building was sold to the Portland Korean Church (which had been located on Northeast 23rd Avenue), in preparation for the church's move to the Beaverton area, which occurred in February 1978.

The building caught fire in September 2020 and was later burned in an arson attack on January 3, 2023, and was subsequently demolished.

== See also ==
- Culture of Portland, Oregon
- Religion in Portland, Oregon
