= Devils Butte Fire =

2023 wildfire in Gilliam County, Oregon

- Part of the 2023 Oregon wildfires
- Date: July 10, 2023 – present
- Location: Gilliam County, Oregon

Statistics
- Burned area: 2,865 acres (1,159 ha)

Ignition
- Cause: Lightning strike

Map
- Perimeter of Devils Butte Fire (map data)

The Devils Butte Fire is an active wildfire in Gilliam County, Oregon. It ignited in the morning on July 10, 2023, due to a lightning strike. As of July 12, 2023, the fire has burned 2,865 acres (1,159 ha) and is 100% contained.

== History ==
The fire began on July 10, 2023, in Gilliam County due to a lightning strike. As of July 12, 2023, it had burned 2,865 acres (1,159 ha) and was 100% contained.

== Cause ==
The fire was ignited on the morning of July 10, 2023 due to a lightning strike.

== Impact ==
As of July 11, no evacuations had been ordered. 5 residences and 25 other structures are threatened. Highway 206 was closed between milepost 0 and milepost 40. Two firetrucks were destroyed by wind driven fire, but no firefighters were injured.
