= Quartz Mountain, Oregon =

Unincorporated community in the state of Oregon, United States

- Unincorporated community
- Location within Oregon Location within the United States
- Coordinates: 42°19′21″N 120°48′56″W
- Country: United States
- State: Oregon
- County: Lake
- Elevation: 5,420 ft (1,650 m)
- Time zone: UTC-8 (Pacific (PST))
  - Summer (DST): UTC-7 (PDT)
- GNIS feature ID: 1136663
- Coordinates and elevation from Geographic Names Information System

Quartz Mountain is an unincorporated community in Lake County in the U.S. state of Oregon. It lies in the Fremont–Winema National Forest along Oregon Route 140 between Bly and Lakeview. Quartz Creek, a tributary of Drews Creek, which feeds Goose Lake, flows through the community.

Quartz Mountain is also the name of a ridge crossed by Route 140 at this point, about 30 miles (48 km) northwest of Lakeview. The mountain, the community, the creek, Quartz Mountain Pass, and Quartz Valley are named after a ledge of quartz in this ridge. Quartz Mountain Pass is the highest point along Route 140.

In 1930, a post office named Quartz Mountain was established along the highway near the pass. Vera A. Real was its first and only postmaster. The post office closed in 1943, and thereafter the Quartz Mountain mail went instead to Lakeview.
