= Oʻahu Forest National Wildlife Refuge =

Protected wildlife refuge in Oʻahu, Hawaii

- IUCN category IV (habitat/species management area)
- Location within Hawaii
- Location: Oʻahu, Hawaii, United States
- Nearest city: Kahaluu, Hawaii
- Coordinates: 21°29′04″N 157°55′20″W
- Area: 4,525 acres (18.31 km^{2})
- Established: 2000
- Governing body: U.S. Fish and Wildlife Service
- Website: Oahu Forest National Wildlife Refuge

Oʻahu Forest National Wildlife Refuge was established in 2000 to protect fish, wildlife, and plants which are listed as threatened or endangered species. The refuge encompasses approximately 4,525 acres (18.31 km^{2}) and is managed by the U.S. Fish & Wildlife Service.

== Landscape ==
The Refuge is located on the upper slopes of the northern Koʻolau Range, on the island of O'ahu.

== Natural resources ==
Oʻahu Forest National Wildlife Refuge is home to at least four species of endangered pupu kani oe (Oʻahu tree snails), 15 endangered plant species, and many native birds, including the Oʻahu ʻelepaio, ʻiʻiwi, pueo, and native honeycreepers.

== Public use ==
The Refuge is closed to the public.
