= Golden Fire =

July 2023 Oregon Wildfire in Klamath County

- Part of the 2023 Oregon wildfires
- Date: July 22, 2023 – August 1, 2023
- Location: Klamath County, near Bonanza, Oregon

Statistics
- Land use: Private property, grass, brush, and timber

Impacts
- Deaths: 0
- Cost: $6.75 million

Ignition
- Cause: Undetermined (Human-caused)

Map
- Perimeter of Golden Fire (map data)

The Golden Fire was a destructive wildfire that ignited on July 22, 2023, in Klamath County in Southern Oregon. The fire burned 2,137 acres (3.3 sq mi) of short grass, timber, and brush on Bly Mountain, destroyed 48 primary residences, and temporarily severed vital communications infrastructure in neighboring regions.

== History ==
The fire was first reported during the early afternoon of July 22, 2023, approximately 9 to 11 miles north of the town of Bonanza. Driven by high temperatures, exceptionally low relative humidity, and erratic afternoon wind gusts, the fire underwent rapid initial expansion through dry ground fuels.

Due to the immediate threat to life and private property, Oregon Governor Tina Kotek invoked the Emergency Conflagration Act on the evening of July 22, enabling the Oregon State Fire Marshal (OSFM) to mobilize structural firefighting task forces from across the state to assist local wildland crews. Management of the incident was assigned to the Oregon Department of Forestry (ODF) Incident Management Team 2.

Firefighters successfully established a complete containment line around the fire perimeter by July 26, shifting focus to extensive interior mop-up operations and dropping hazardous snags. On August 1, 2023, command transitioned from the ODF Team to a localized Type 4 organization as containment reached high security. Full containment was officially logged on August 1, 2023.

== Cause ==
Initial speculation reported by media outlets suggested the fire may have originated from an unpermitted illegal marijuana cultivation site. However, following a preliminary field investigation, the Klamath County Sheriff's Office formally ruled out a marijuana grow operation as the point of origin. While federal records compiled by the Northwest Interagency Coordination Center categorize the baseline ignition as human-caused rather than natural lightning, the precise root cause remains officially undetermined.

== Impact ==
The Golden Fire was highly destructive to structures relative to its size because it swept through rural residential properties on Bly Mountain. Final damage assessments confirmed that 48 primary homes were completely destroyed and 3 were damaged. Furthermore, 69 auxiliary outbuildings were lost and 4 were damaged. In September 2023, the Klamath County Board of Commissioners passed a formal resolution waiving or reducing rebuilding permit fees to alleviate the financial strain on displaced residents attempting to replace their structures.

The wildfire also directly burned through a primary fiber-optic trunk line, triggering an immediate and widespread communications blackout across neighboring Lake County. This outage disabled regional internet, landline phone networks, and essential municipal emergency dispatch lines, forcing the Lake County Board of Commissioners to declare a separate local state of emergency on July 24 until utility crews could safely access the burn area to splice the line.

To fund the emergency response, FEMA Region 10 approved a Fire Management Assistance Grant (FMAG) on July 23, authorizing federal matching funds to cover 75% of Oregon’s eligible state firefighting expenditures. The total fiscal cost to suppress the incident reached approximately $6.75 million.
