= 2023 Oregon wildfires =

Natural disasters in the USA

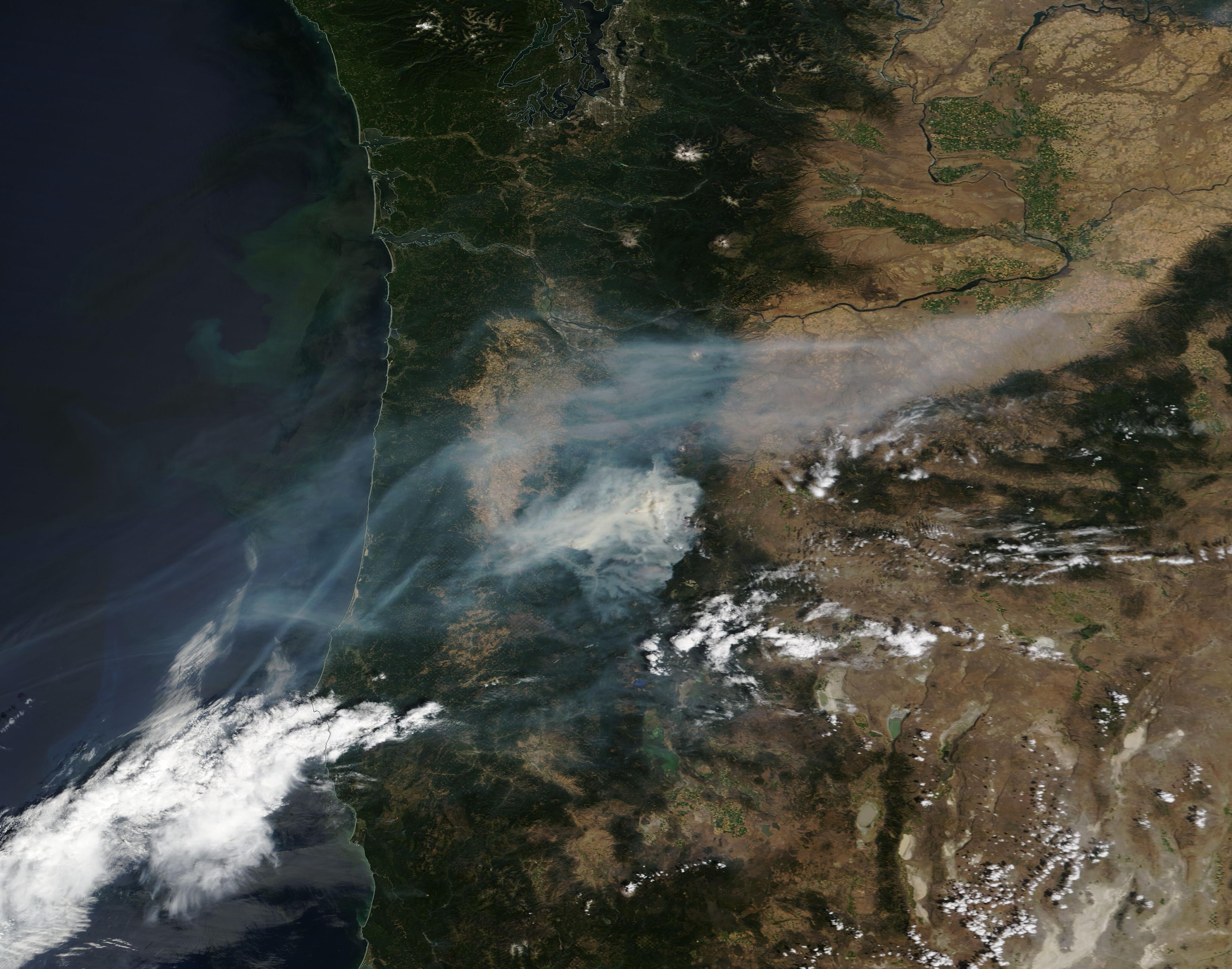
- Smoke from Oregon wildfires seen in a NASA image taken August 15 by the Terra satellite
- Date: January 1 –; December 31, 2023

Statistics
- Total fires: 1,731
- Total area: 259,725 acres (105,107 ha)

Map
- Map of 2023 Oregon wildfires (map data)

This article is a summary of the 2023 Oregon wildfire season, comprising the series of significant wildfires that have burned in the U.S. state of Oregon since the beginning of the calendar year. Fire season officially began in all areas of the state by July 1, according to the Oregon Department of Forestry (ODF). As of September 5, 2023, the state had recorded 1,731 fires, which had burned a total of 159,991 acres (64,746 hectares).

== Background ==
"Fire season" in Oregon typically begins in mid-May and ends with the first rains that normally begins in late September. Drought, snowpack levels, and local weather conditions play a role in Oregon's fire season, particularly in Eastern and Southwest Oregon. During peak fire season from July to September, most wildfires are caused by lightning, while ignitions in the early and later parts of the season are related to humans. Warm, dry conditions in summer heighten the wildfire risk. After over 100 years of fire suppression and prevention of all fires, there is now an abundance of fuel. Climate change is leading to a reduced snowpack with an earlier and reduced snowmelt, so there is a higher risk for areas that receive wildfires.

== Outlook ==
Fire season in the Pacific Northwest often lasts from May until October. The National Interagency Coordination Center, in its seasonal fire assessment and outlook released in July, forecast above-normal significant fire potential in the Pacific Northwest through September. The August outlook continued this forecast, predicting that "Significant fire potential will be above average for the entire geographic area in August and September. In October, elevated risk of significant fires will shift west of the Cascades due to the likelihood of dry easterly winds in autumn. By November, significant fire risk will decrease back to normal (i.e., low) for the entire geographic area as cooler and wetter weather arrives."

All Oregon Department of Forestry districts declared the beginning of fire season by July 1. The Northwest Coordination Center upgraded the region's preparedness level (referring to the availability of firefighting resources) from PL 1 to PL 2 on July 3, PL 3 on July 23, PL 4 on August 12, and PL5—the highest level—on August 19.

== Impacts ==
Wildfires during the season caused evacuations, transportation disruptions, property losses, utility outages, and periods of degraded air quality. Highway closures and wildfire smoke affected businesses near the Smith River Complex, which burned in northern California and southern Oregon. The Golden Fire in Klamath County destroyed 43 residences and more than 40 outbuildings near Bonanza, and damaged communications infrastructure, causing loss of 911 service, phone service, and internet access in nearby areas.

== List of wildfires ==
The following is a list of Oregon wildfires in 2023 that have burned more than 1,000 acres (400 hectares), have resulted in casualties or significant damage to structures, or have otherwise been notable. Acreage and containment figures may not be up-to-date.

Name	County	Acres	Start date	Containment date (Note: Containment means that fire crews have established and secured control lines around the fire's perimeter. These lines are artificial barriers, like trenches or cleared vegetation, designed to stop the fire's spread, or natural barriers like rivers. Containment reflects progress in managing the fire but does not necessarily mean the fire is starved of fuel, under control, or put out.)	Notes	Refs
Madeuce	Morrow	2,160	May 15	May 18	Human-caused.	
Dillon Creek	Klamath	3,119	May 20	June 6	Caused by lightning. This fire was allowed to burn at a low intensity, within a confined footprint, for ecological benefits. Estimated cost of suppression is $1.38 million.	
Hat Rock	Umatilla, Walla Walla (WA)	16,816	June 13	June 17	Cause under investigation. Burned in grass and sagebrush, causing evacuations as it burned into Washington. Estimated cost of suppression is $663,000.	
Alder Creek	Wheeler	1,551	July 6	July 15	Cause under investigation. Estimated cost of suppression is $2 million.	
Devil's Butte	Gilliam	2,859	July 10	July 18	Caused by lightning. Burned in rangelands and wheat fields, destroying two fire engines. Estimated cost of suppression is $800,000.	
Flat	Curry	34,242	July 15	2023	Human-caused; under investigation. Burning partially in the footprint of the 2002 Biscuit Fire. Estimated cost of suppression is $59 million.	
Simnasho	Wasco	1,280	July 21	Unknown	Cause unknown. Estimated cost of suppression is $2 million.	
Golden	Klamath	2,137	July 22	August 6	Cause under investigation. 117 structures destroyed, including at least 43 homes. The fire also damaged six miles of fiber-optic cables and more than 100 power poles in Klamath County. Estimated cost of suppression is $8.5 million.	
Bedrock	Lane	31,590	July 22	October 4	Cause under investigation. Estimated cost of suppression is $50.2 million.	
Corbie	Harney, Malheur	1,141	August 1	August 3	Cause unknown. Estimated cost of suppression is $350,000.	
Lookout	Lane, Linn	25,754	August 5	October 11	Caused by lightning. Evacuations in effect. Estimated cost of suppression is $18.2 million.	
Smith River Complex	Curry, Josephine, Del Norte (CA)	95,107	August 15	November 17	Burning mostly in California. Caused by lightning. Consists of the Holiday, Diamond, Kelly, and Prescott fires, as well as many smaller fires.	
Camp Creek	Clackamas, Multnomah	2,055	August 24	2023	Caused by lightning. Burning in the Bull Run Watershed in the Mount Hood National Forest.	
Tyee Ridge Complex	Douglas	7,945	August 24	2023	Consists of the Cougar Creek Fire, Tyee Mountain Fire, Big Tom Fire, and Lighthouse fires.	
Chilcoot	Douglas	1,940	August 24	2023	Burning in the Umpqua National Forest.	
Anvil	Curry	22,170	August 25	October	Burning in the Grassy Knob Wilderness.	
Petes Lake	Lane	3,254	August 25	2023	Burning in the Three Sisters Wilderness.	
Cottonwood Canyon	Sherman	2,316	August 29	September 2	Burned on both sides of the John Day River.	
Morgan	Lake	2,289	September 18	2023	Burning in the Fremont–Winema National Forest.	

== Gallery ==
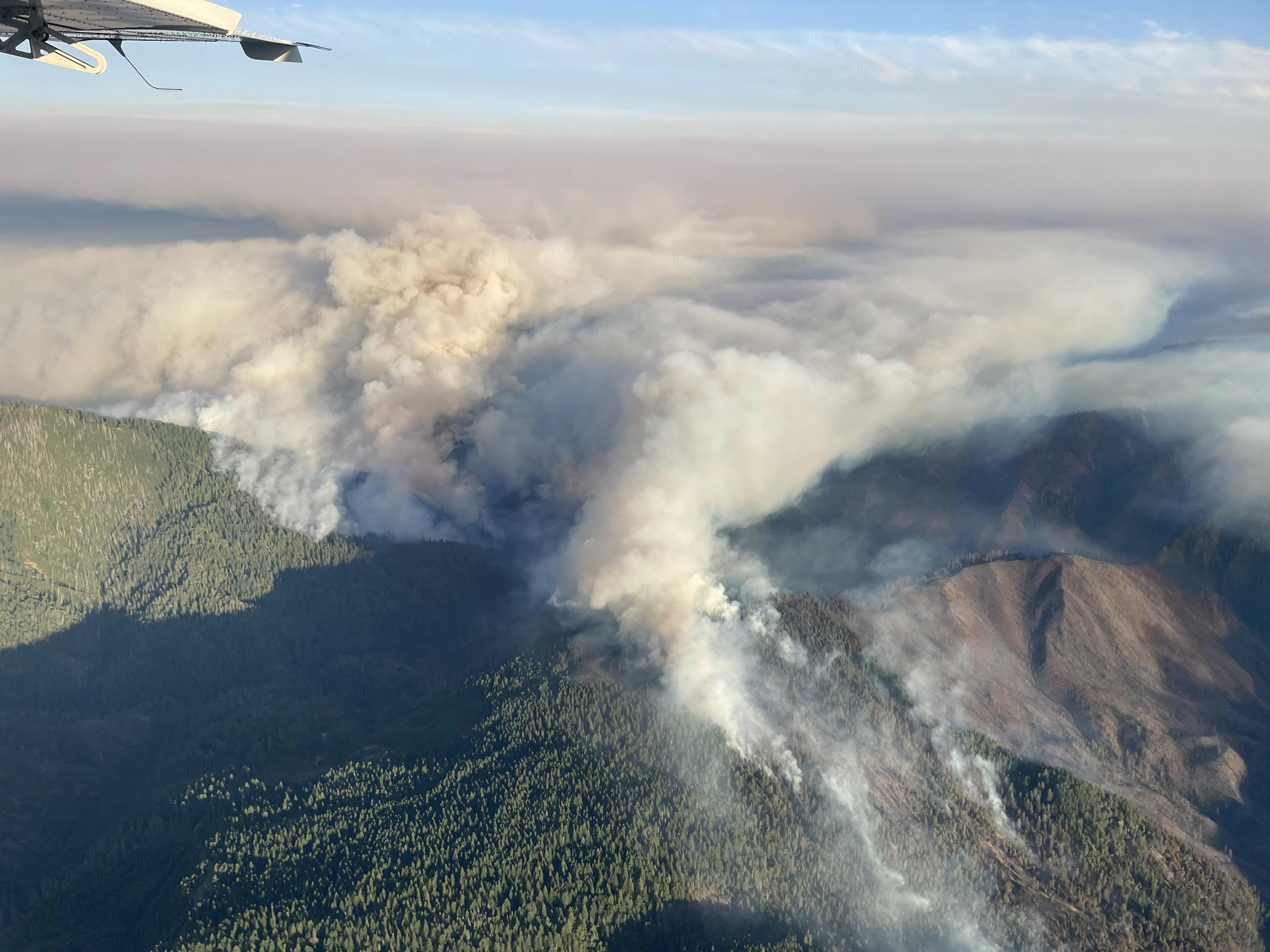
The Flat Fire on July 17

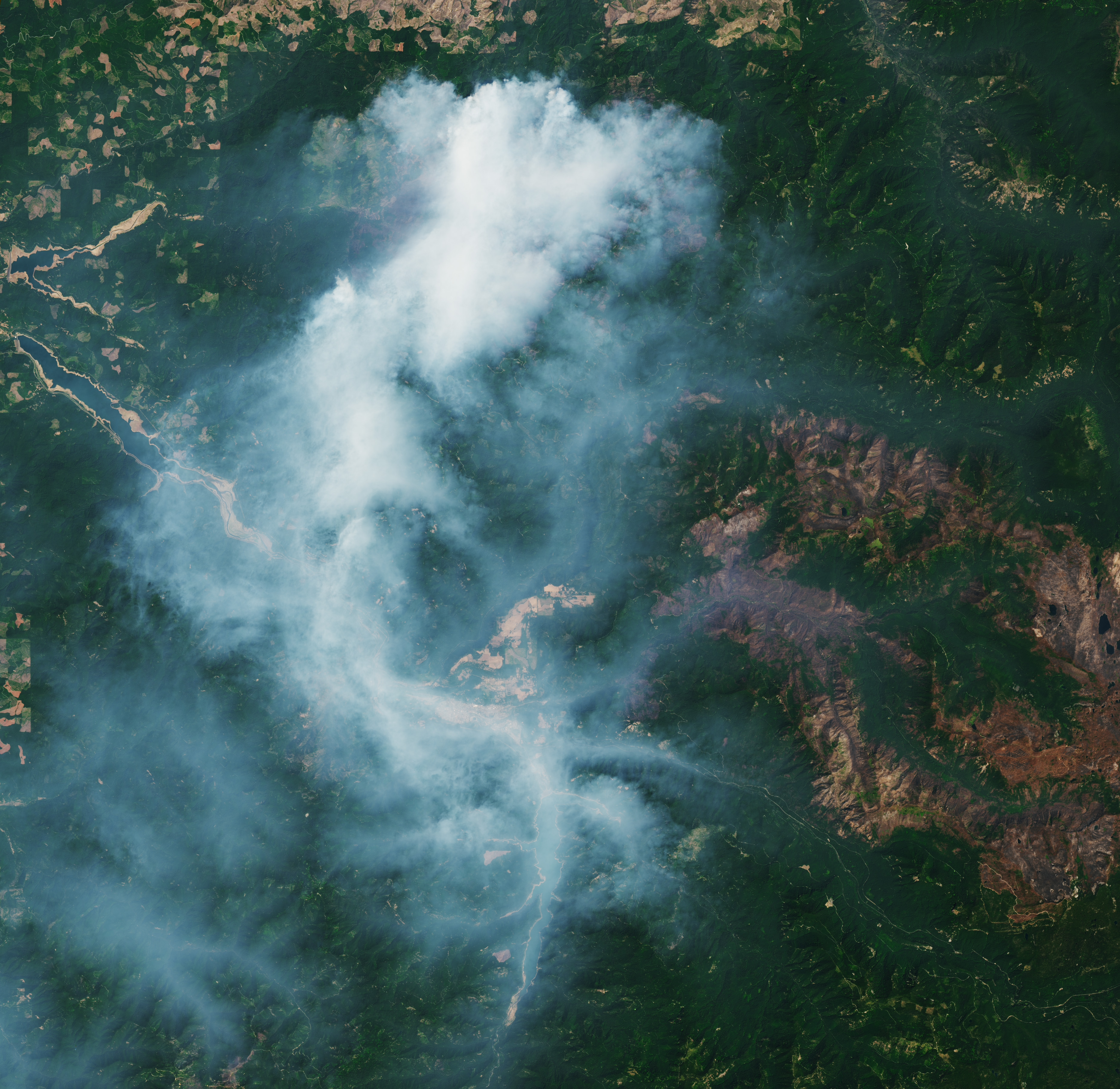
The Bedrock Fire on August 1

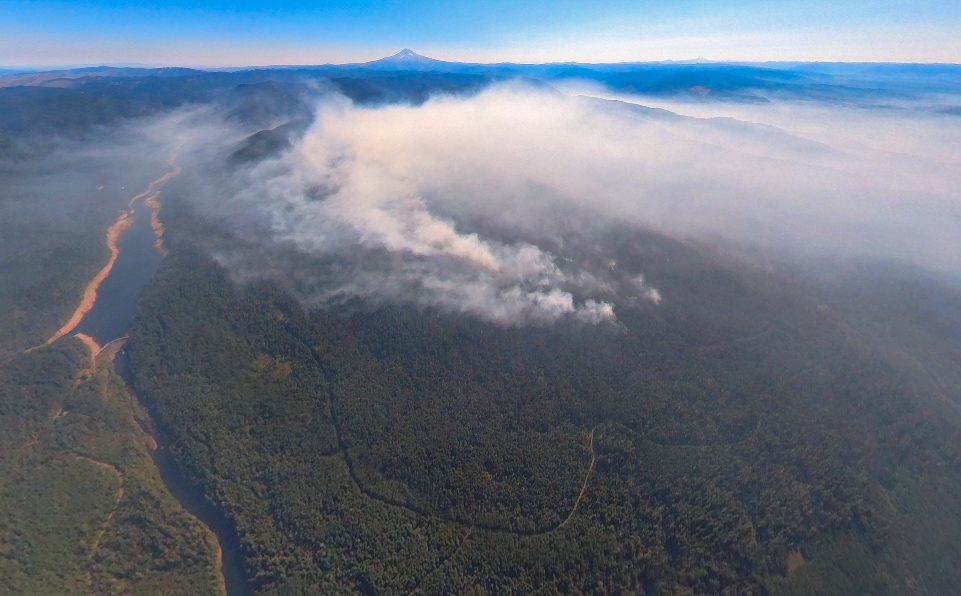
The Camp Creek Fire on September 9

== See also ==
- 2023 California wildfires
- 2023 Washington wildfires
