= Alder Creek Fire =

2023 wildfire in Wheeler County, Oregon

- Part of the 2023 Oregon wildfires
- Date: July 6, 2023 – present
- Location: Wheeler County, Oregon

Statistics
- Burned area: 1,551 acres (628 ha)

Ignition
- Cause: under investigation

Map
- Perimeter of Alder Creek Fire (map data)

The Alder Creek Fire is an active wildfire in Wheeler County, Oregon. Ignited in the early afternoon at about 5 pm on July 6, 2023, the cause of the fire is still under investigation. The fire ultimately burned 1,551 acres (628 ha) of land.

== History ==
The fire began near U.S. Route 19 at mile marker 81. As of July 8, 2023, it had burned 760 acres (310 ha) and was 0% contained. On July 15, 2023 the fire was fully contained. It ultimately destroyed a total of 1,551 acres (628 ha) of land.

== Cause ==
The cause of the fire is currently unknown and under investigation.

== Impact ==
No evacuations were ordered, and no structures or communities were threatened.
