= Flat Fire (2023) =

2023 wildfire near Agness, Oregon

- Part of the 2023 Oregon wildfires
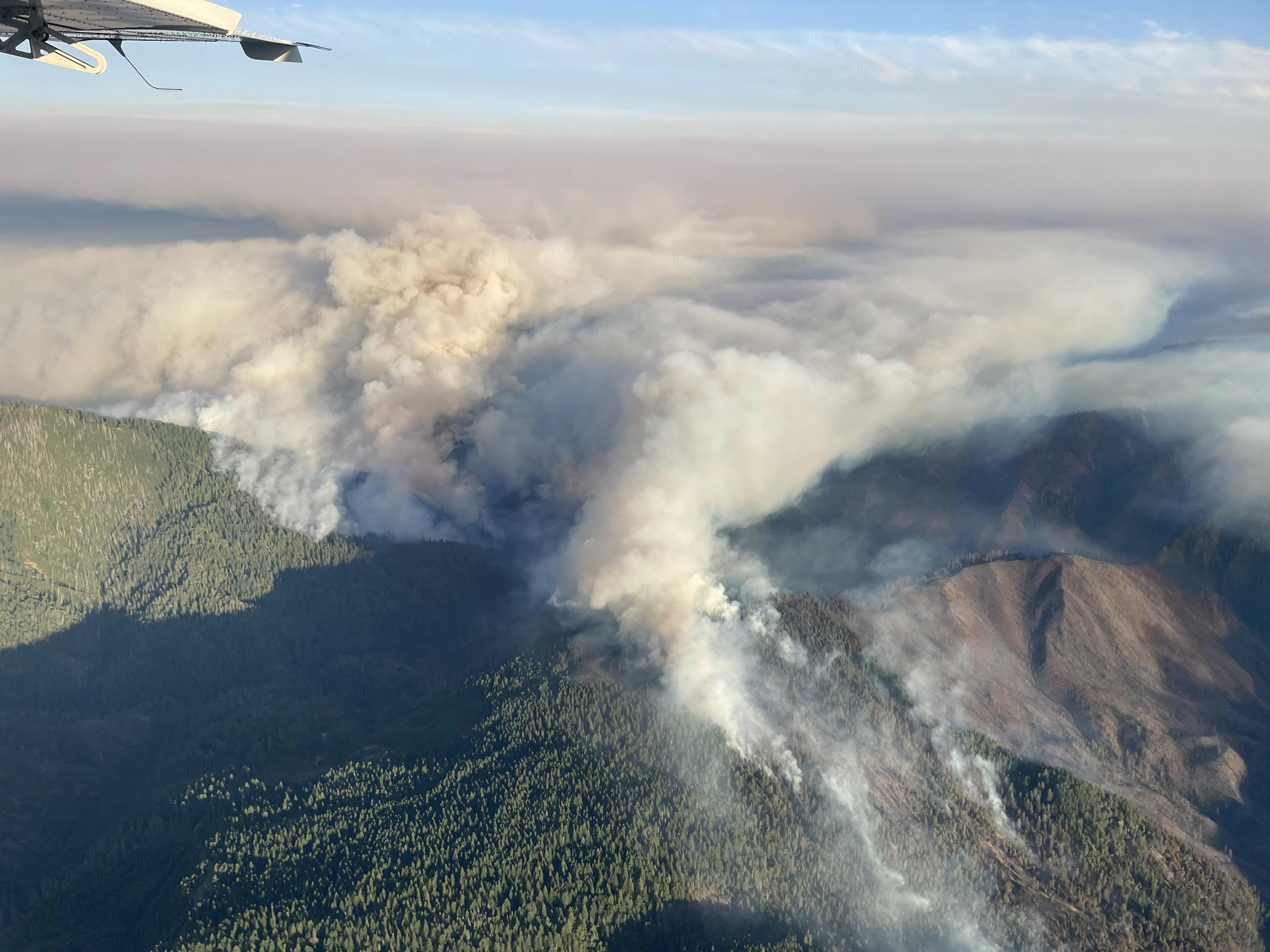
- Smoke plume from the fire on July 17
- Date: July 15, 2023 – present
- Location: Siskiyou National Forest, near Agness, Oregon
- Coordinates: 42°30′57″N 124°2′14″W

Statistics
- Burned area: 34,242 acres (13,857 ha)

Ignition
- Cause: Human caused

Map
- Perimeter of Flat Fire (map data)
- The fires location in south west Oregon

The Flat Fire was a wildfire near Agness, Oregon in the Rogue River-Siskiyou National Forest. Ignited at about 5:51 PM PT on July 15, 2023, the fire was determined to be human-caused. As of October 31, 2023, the fire had burned 34,242 acres (13,857 ha) and was 100% contained.

== History ==
The fire began about 2 miles southeast of Agness, Oregon at around 5:51 PM PT on July 15, 2023. As of October 31, 2023, the fire had burned 34,242 acres (13,857 ha) and was 100% contained.

== Cause ==
The fire was determined to be human-caused.

== Impact ==
Level 3 evacuations were issued for the area surrounding the Oak Flat Campground in Curry County, Oregon. A temporary evacuation shelter was set up at Gold Beach High School in Gold Beach, Oregon for anyone displaced by the fire. A closure order was in effect for Siskiyou National Forest lands surrounding the fire.
