= Wildfires in 2023 =

List of major wildfires in the year 2023

2023 wildfire season
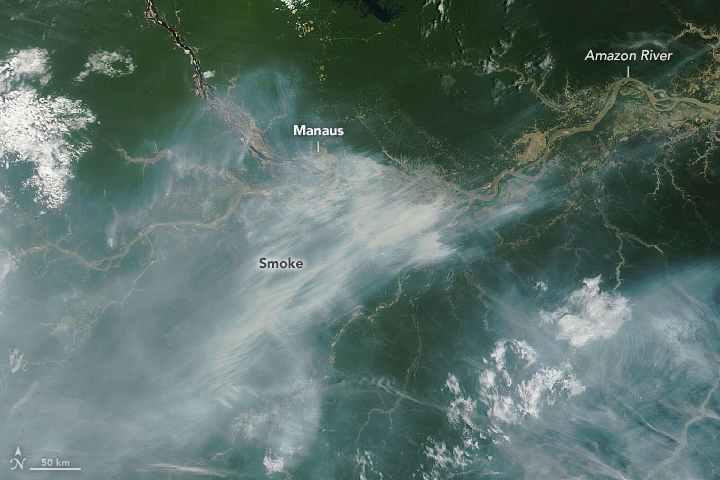
- Smoke streaming from fires burning near Manaus, capital city of Brazil’s Amazonas state, on October 11, 2023
- Date: January–December 2023

The 2023 wildfire season involved wildfires on multiple continents.

Below is a list of articles on wildfires from around the world in the year 2023.

== Africa ==
- 2023 North Africa wildfires

== Asia ==
- 2023 Kazakhstan wildfires
- 2023 Turkey wildfires

== Europe ==
- 2023 Greece wildfires
- 2023 Italy wildfires
- 2023 Spain wildfires
- 2023 Tenerife wildfire, the worst in the Canary Islands in 40 years.
- Cannich wildfire, United Kingdom

== North America ==
=== Canada ===
Perimeters of 2023 Canadian wildfires - season to date (map data)
- 2023 Canadian wildfires
  - 2023 Alberta wildfires
  - 2023 Nova Scotia wildfires
- McDougall Creek Fire

=== United States ===
Perimeters of 2023 United States wildfires with markers - season to date (≥ 1000 acres) (map data)
- 2023 Arizona wildfires
- 2023 California wildfires
- 2023 Colorado wildfires
- 2023 Florida wildfires
- 2023 Hawaii wildfires
- 2023 Idaho wildfires
- 2023 Louisiana wildfires
- 2023 Montana wildfires
- 2023 Nevada wildfires
- 2023 New Mexico wildfires
- 2023 North Carolina wildfires
- 2023 Oregon wildfires
- 2023 Utah wildfires
- 2023 Washington wildfires

== South America ==
- 2023 Chile wildfires

== See also ==
- Weather of 2023
