= Gray Fire =

2023 wildfire in Washington, U.S.

- Part of the 2023 Washington wildfires
- Date: August 18, 2023 – September 11, 2023
- Location: Near Medical Lake, Spokane County, Washington, US
- Coordinates: 47°32′24″N 117°43′52″W

Statistics
- Burned area: 10,085 acres (4,081 ha)

Impacts
- Deaths: 1
- Structures lost: 240
- Cost: $60 million (2023 USD)

Ignition
- Cause: Sparks from faulty light owned by Inland Power

Map
- Perimeter of Gray Fire (map data)

The Gray Fire was a wildfire in Spokane County, Washington, United States. It began near Medical Lake at about 12:27 pm on August 18, 2023. As of September 1, 2023, the fire had burned 10,085 acres (4,081 ha) and was 100% contained. In addition to burning 259 structures, the death of one person was determined to be connected to the fire.

== History ==
=== August ===
The Gray Fire began near Medical Lake at about 12:27 pm on August 18, 2023. The following day it grew to 9,500 acres (3,800 ha). That same day the fire reached 10% containment.

On August 20, the burned area reached 10,014 acres (4,053 ha), while containment remained at 10%.

On August 22, containment increased to 48% (mainly due in part to the rain that day which allowed authorities to evaluate damage to structures), while the burned area slightly increased to 10,016 acres (4,053 ha). Later the same day all evacuations in Medical Lake were lowered to Level 2 with only one area in the unincorporated area of Four Lakes still under a Level 3 evacuation.

On August 24, containment further increased to 58%. Interstate 90 was re-opened on both sides. Washington State Route 904 and Washington State Route 902 were also re-opened that same day.

On August 25, containment increased to 68%.

On August 26, containment increased to 73% and the burned area only grew to 10,085 acres (4,081 ha).

On August 27, containment reached 85% while the burned area remained the same.

September

On September 1, fire containment reached to 97% with the burned area remaining the same. Later that day, containment reached to 100%

== Cause ==
The cause of the Gray Fire was determined to be a faulty Inland Power and Light Company outdoor light. On September 26, 2023, two lawsuits had been filed against Inland Power and Light Company due to the damage caused by Gray Fire .

== Impact ==
=== Closures and evacuations ===
Level 3 evacuation orders were issued for the city of Medical Lake and the unincorporated community of Four Lakes on August 18. Level 2 evacuations were also issued for the city of Cheney that same day. An evacuation shelter was opened at Spokane Falls Community College. Lakeland Village residents and staff were evacuated to Eastern State Hospital. They were able to return later that night.

Interstate 90 from milepost 257 to milepost 270 and the entirery of State Route 902 were closed on August 18 due to the fire.

=== Damage ===
By August 21, the fire had burned 265 structures and one person died due to the fire. Another person also died from the nearby Oregon Fire. Additionally at least 850 mixed residential buildings were threatened by the fire.

=== Air Pollution ===
Smoke primarily from wildfires burning in Canada, as well as the Gray Fire and two other fires in Spokane County caused Spokane, Washington to have the worst air quality in the United States for two days, on August 19 and August 20. Air quality index levels reached a peak level of 511 in Spokane in the morning of August 20.

=== Political ===
In response to the Gray Fire and 2 other fires, the Spokane County Board of Commissioners issued a county-wide state of emergency declaration for Spokane County allowing state and federal assistance to come into Spokane County. Washington Governor Jay Inslee also issued a state of emergency for the fires which allows further assistance along with the activation of the Washington National Guard to assist in containment of the fires.

On August 20, the Washington state government's request to the Federal Emergency Management Agency (FEMA) for a Fire Management Assistance Grant was approved. The grant provides federal funds primarily to help with various firefighting costs.
