= 2023 Utah wildfires =

Overview of major wildfires in Utah in 2023

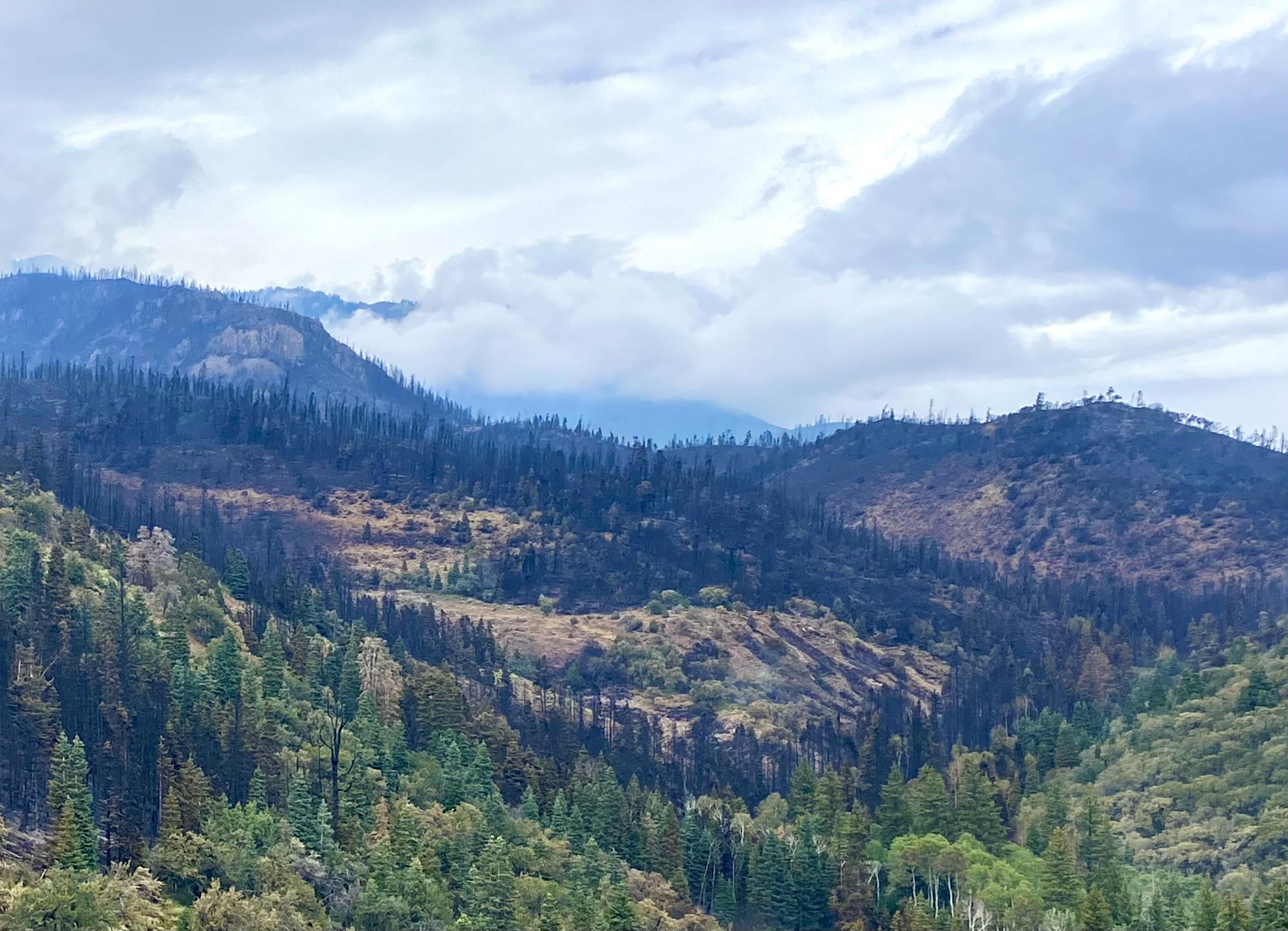
- Burn scar from the Thompson Ridge Fire

Statistics
- Total fires: 808
- Total area: 18,061 acres (7,309 ha; 73.09 km^{2})

A series of wildfires burned throughout the U.S. state of Utah during 2023.

== Background ==
While the typical wildfire season in Utah varies, most fires occur in between July and October. Fire conditions can heavily depend on monsoons that last from late June to September. Dry monsoons can allow fires to start and spread easier, while wet ones can cause fire relief. Additionally, hot temperatures and overall dry conditions play a large role.

== Summary ==
Concerns for a destructive fire season began after Utah's snowpack reached 30 inches (760 mm) and began melting in spring. However, the start of fire season was late due to high fuel moistures from the snowpack. The El Niño prolonged cool, moist conditions from May through early July. Hot and dry conditions minimally increased fire activity in late July and early August, but was still well below average. Precipitation increased later in August (when 60% of Utah's summer precipitation occurred that year), coming when most vegetation began drying up. Additionally, the temperature that season was the lowest in Utah since 2014, 1.5 °F above the 20th century average. Heavy rains in September effectively brought an end to fire season.

== List of wildfires ==
The following is a list of fires that burned more than 1,000 acres (400 ha), or produced significant structural damage or casualties.

Name	County	Acres	Start date	Containment Date (Note: Containment means that fire crews have established and secured control lines around the fire's perimeter. These lines are artificial barriers, like trenches or cleared vegetation, designed to stop the fire's spread, or natural barriers like rivers. Containment reflects progress in managing the fire but does not necessarily mean the fire is starved of fuel, under control, or put out.)	Notes	Ref
I70 MM 270	Grand	1,802	July 10	2023	Caused by a rollover crash on Interstate 70. Burned near the Utah/Colorado border and closed Interstate 70. Was 89% contained on July 11.	
Rocky	Tooele	1,300	July 21	July 22	Unknown cause. Burned near Ibapah.	
Thompson Ridge	Beaver	7,253	August 4	September 7	Lightning-caused. Burned 10 miles (16 km) southeast of Beaver.	
Light House Canyon	Emery	2,037	August 16	2023	Lightning-caused. Burned 14 miles (23 km) southeast of East Carbon. Was 85% contained on November 6.	
Box	Sevier	2,038	September 19	2023	Lightning-caused. Burned 10 miles (16 km) northwest of Emery. Due to low fire risk from heavy precipitation and the lateness into the season, firefighters allowed to burn for ecosystem restoration.	

Perimeters of 2023 Utah wildfires with markers(map data)

== See also ==
- 2023 Arizona wildfires
- 2023 Colorado wildfires
- 2023 New Mexico wildfires
- Wildfires in 2023
