= Tunnel Five Fire =

2023 wildfire in Skamania County, Washington

- Part of the 2023 Washington wildfires
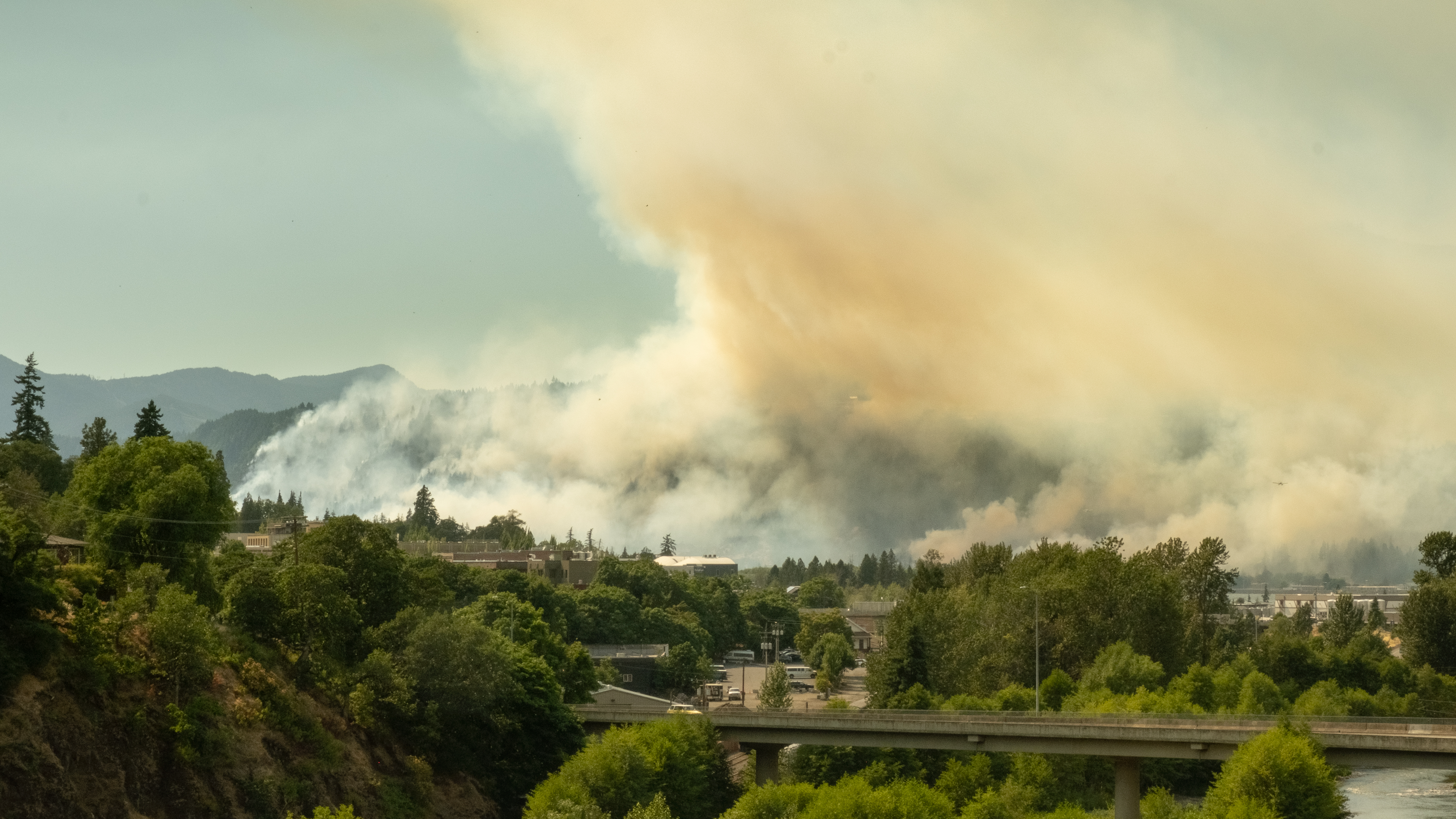
- Looking northwest from OR-35 in Hood River, Oregon, the Tunnel Five Fire can be seen burning on July 2nd, 2023.
- Date: July 2, 2023 – July 11, 2023
- Location: Skamania County, Washington, United States
- Coordinates: 45.722482°N 121.578618°W

Statistics
- Burned area: 529 acres (214 ha)

Ignition
- Cause: under investigation

Map
- Approximate perimeter of Tunnel Five Fire (map data)
- Location within Washington (state)

The Tunnel Five Fire or Tunnel 5 Fire was a wildfire in Skamania County, Washington in the Columbia River Gorge, near the border with Oregon. Ignited in the morning of July 2, 2023, the fire was caused by a BNSF locomotive exhaust. By July 10, the fire was 80% contained, and by the following day it reached 100% containment.

== History ==
The fire began in the unincorporated community of Underwood, Washington, 2 miles (3.2 km) west of White Salmon, Washington during a period of hot, dry conditions that was forecasted to last through the July 4 holiday. As of July 7, 2023, it had burned 546 acres (221 ha) and was 20% containment, and was moving westward.

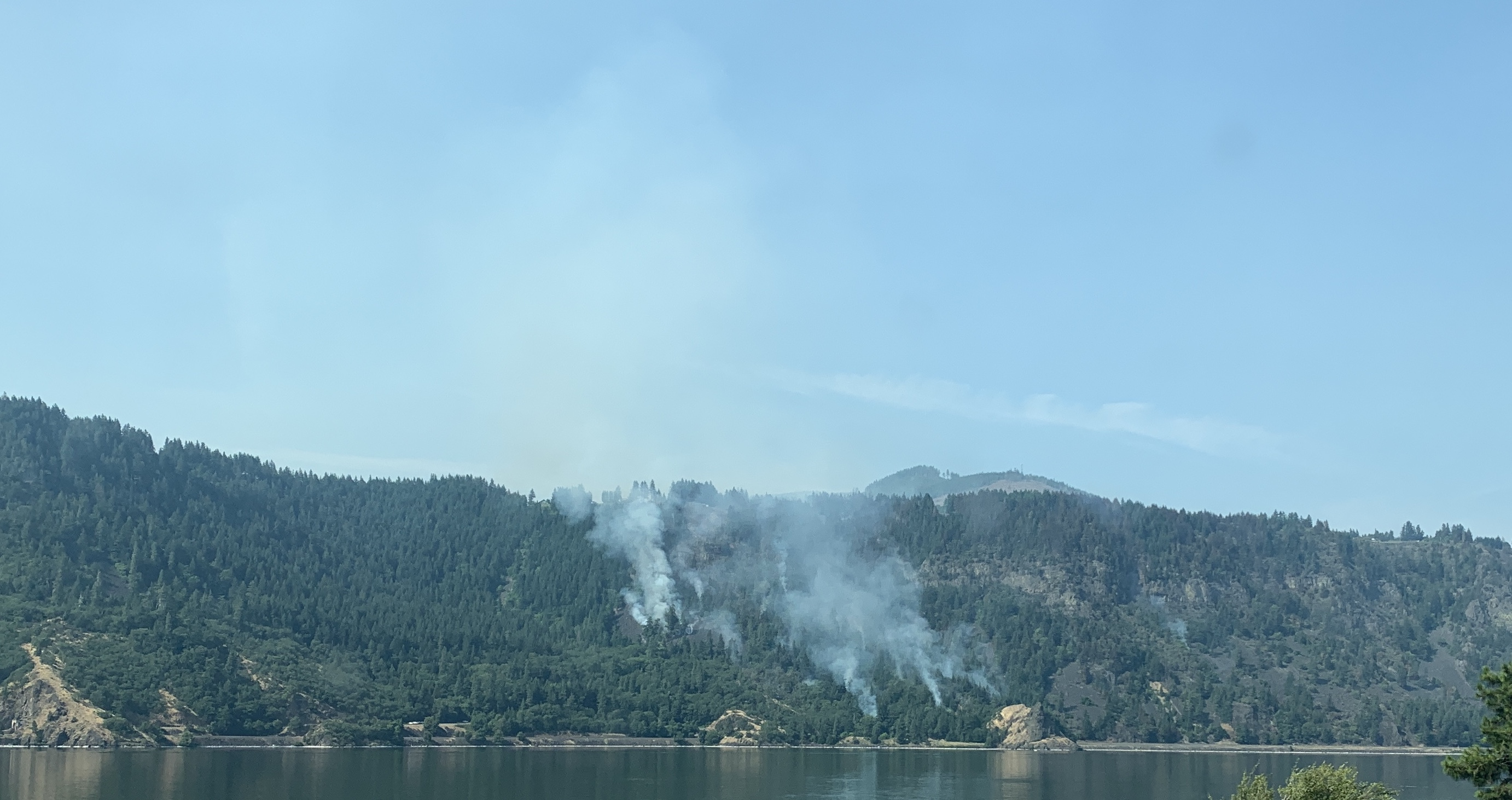
Tunnel Five Fire burns above Washington SR14 on July 5, 2023.

== Impact ==
10 homes were estimated to have been burned, with 250 nearby homes threatened. Fourth of July celebrations were cancelled in White Salmon and nearby towns of Hood River, Oregon, and local bans on personal fireworks were put into place, in addition to a red flag warning. Level 3 evacuation warnings impacted about 1,000 Skamania county residents.

An emergency shelter for evacuees was opened at the Skamania County Fairgrounds. Other areas around the Columbia River Gorge were under warnings to prepare for potential evacuations. As of July 6, 2023, 461 emergency workers had been deployed to fight the fire using engines and multiple aircraft.

The fire caused Washington State Route 14 to be closed in both directions from Milepost 56 to Milepost 65 beginning on July 4. It reopened to traffic on July 12 after the fire had reached 80 percent containment.
