= Milan, Washington =

Unincorporated community in Washington, United States

- Unincorporated community
- Location within Washington (state)
- Coordinates: 47°58′01″N 117°19′54″W
- Country: United States
- State: Washington
- County: Spokane
- Elevation: 1,800 ft (550 m)
- Time zone: UTC-8 (Pacific (PST))
  - Summer (DST): UTC-7 (PDT)
- ZIP code: 99003
- Area code: 509
- GNIS feature ID: 1512463

Milan is an unincorporated community in Spokane County, Washington, United States. It is named after the Italian city of Milan.

== Geography ==
Milan is a rural community located along the Burlington Northern Railroad in northern Spokane County. The Little Spokane River flows through flows through the community. U.S. Route 2 runs north-south about a mile and a half west of Milan. Nearby communities include Elk, 5 miles upstream from Milan, and Deer Park, 7 miles to the west. Spokane, the region's largest city, is 23 miles to the south along U.S. Route 2.

The community is located in a thin but deep valley that rises from 1,800 feet (550 m) along the Little Spokane River up to 2,638 feet (804 m) at the summit of Milan Hill just southeast of the town site. The foothills and mountains in the Milan area are part of the Selkirk Mountains.

Milan is served by the Riverside School District. The schools are located just outside of town at the intersection of U.S. Route 2 and Deer Park-Milan Road.

== History ==
In 1900, Milan was an important shipping point on the Great Northern Railway. There were two sawmills in the community, and two more within a couple of miles, which supplied lumber to the city of Spokane. James Conalton was Milan's postmaster and storekeeper at the time.

Today Milan is a residential community with a few dozen buildings. At the intersection of U.S. Route 2 and Deer Park-Milan road, about a mile and a half from the original community, are commercial and public buildings including restaurants, a market and schools that serve the broader area.
