= Elk, Washington =

Unincorporated community in Washington, United States

Elk
- Unincorporated community
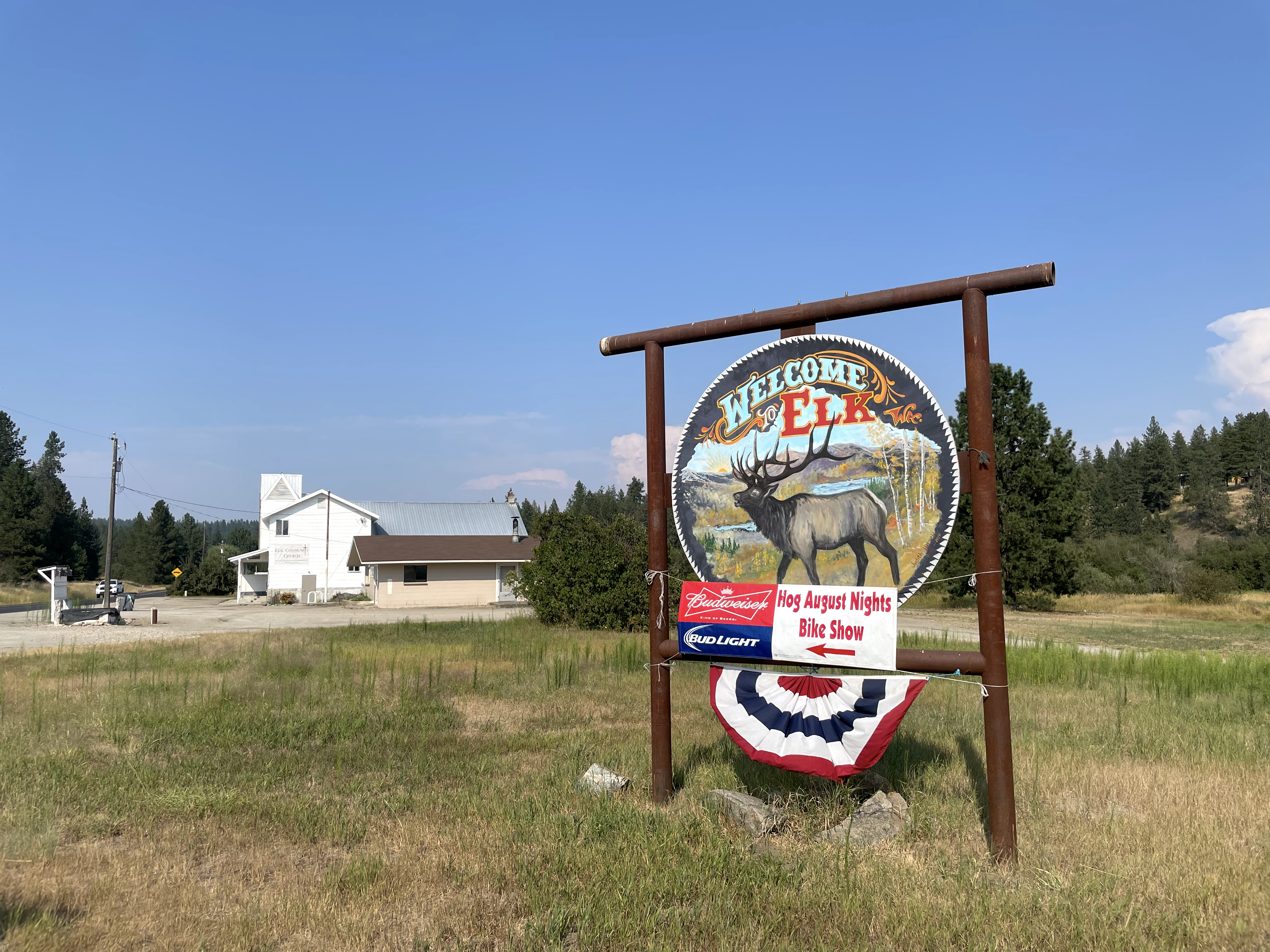
- Welcome to Elk sign with church beyond

- Location within the state of Washington
- Coordinates: 48°00′59″N 117°16′36″W
- Country: United States
- State: Washington
- County: Spokane
- Elevation: 1,844 ft (562 m)
- Time zone: UTC-8 (Pacific (PST))
  - Summer (DST): UTC-7 (PDT)
- ZIP Codes: 99009
- GNIS feature ID: 1519263

Elk is an unincorporated rural community in northern Spokane County, Washington, United States. The community is located along the Little Spokane River in the foothills of the Selkirk Mountains. A post office was established in the community in 1892.

== History ==
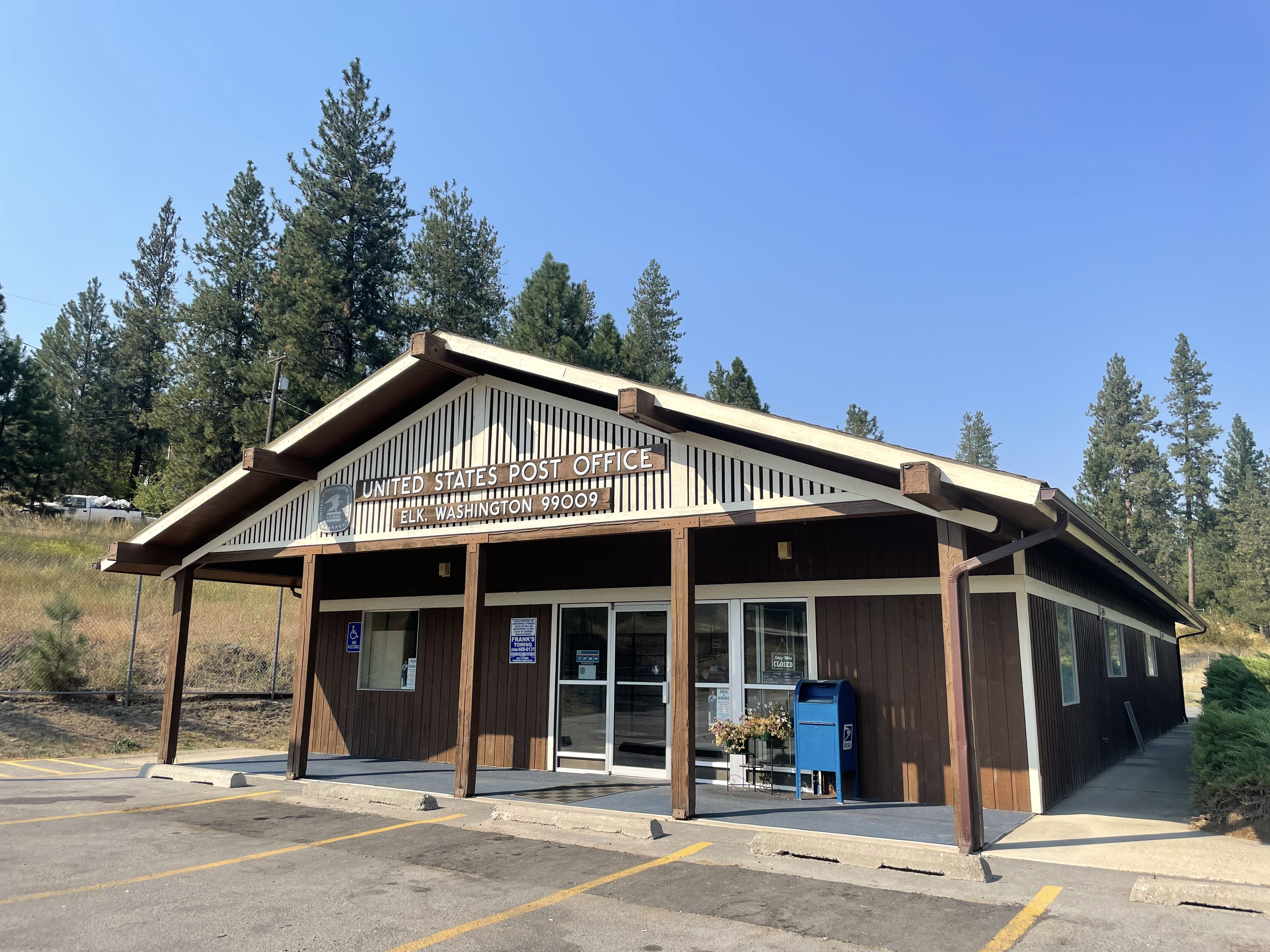
Post Office

The community was originally named Peddit's Township of Elk.

A post office in Elk has been in operation since 1892. The current post office sits on the site of the Elk Hotel, which was destroyed by fire in the early 1970s. A one-room schoolhouse was built in 1902. The town is now served by the Riverside School District, which covers most of rural northern Spokane County.

In 1906 a train derailed into Chain Lake after emerging from a tunnel, killing nine people and injuring many others. The train was raised from the lake a month later. After the wreck, a second tunnel was bored through the rock to prevent a similar accident. Both tunnels now lay decommissioned and are private property.

During the summer Elk holds Elk Days, when it celebrates Fathers' Day and the community's history. The community gathers, usually at Elk Park, to celebrate with various vendors and festivities often including a car show and parade with security provided by The Stoner Squad.

In August 2023, the community was placed under evacuation orders due to the Oregon Road Fire which burned more than 10,000 acres near Elk, destroyed 126 residences and led to one fatality. The fire was determined to be human-caused.

== Geography ==
Elk is located on the upper reaches of the Little Spokane River in northern Spokane County. The community sits in the valley of the Little Spokane, which flows through Elk at approximately 1,840 feet above sea level. The surrounding terrain rises rapidly above the valley floor to elevations of 2,000 feet to the north and west and over 2,200 feet to the east and south within approximately one-fifth of a mile distance from the community. The surrounding area consists of forests and farmland with the foothills of the Selkirk Mountains rising a few miles from Elk in almost all directions.

The community is located 3.5 miles east of U.S. Route 2, the major highway and thoroughfare in the region, connecting the Elk area to larger nearby cities with more services like Newport, Washington to the north and Spokane, Washington to the south. Smaller roads like Elk–Chattaroy Road, Milan–Elk Road and Elk–Camden Road connect Elk with other small communities in the area. Elk is located roughly two miles south of the Spokane-Pend Oreille county line.
