= 2023 Washington wildfires =

Natural disasters in the USA

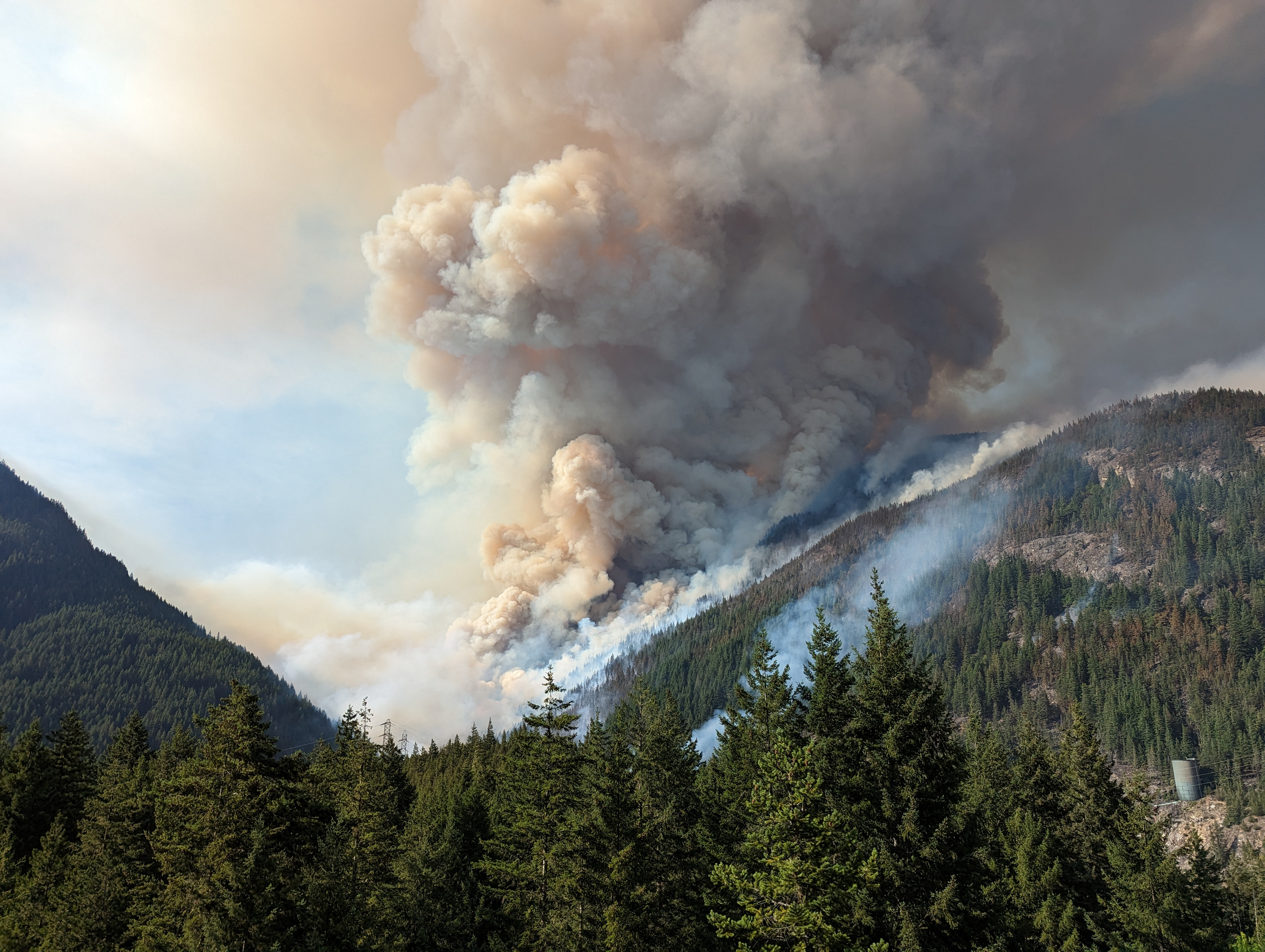
- The Sourdough Fire on August 4
- Date: March 2023–December 2023

Statistics
- Total fires: 1,515
- Total area: 165,365 acres (66,921 hectares)

Impacts
- Deaths: 2

The 2023 Washington wildfire season officially began in March 2023 in the US state of Washington.

Conditions going into the season were low-risk for fire, with higher than average precipitation over the prior winter and spring. Some experts anticipated a later peak, possibly into November, for the Pacific Northwest due to El Niño effects.

The Washington State Department of Natural Resources planned to ignite controlled burns on over 2,100 acres (8 km^{2}) to prevent larger fires from developing during the season.

The Northwest Coordination Center upgraded the region's preparedness level (referring to the availability of firefighting resources) from PL 1 to PL 2 on July 3, PL 3 on July 23, PL 4 on August 12, and PL5—the highest level—on August 19.

The Washington State Department of Natural Resources dashboard reported that 1,515 fires burned at least 146,220 acres (59,170 hectares) in Washington through August, 2024.

== Background ==
While the typical "fire season" in Washington varies every year based on weather conditions, most wildfires occur in between July and October. However, hotter, drier conditions can allow wildfires to start outside of these boundaries. Wildfires tend to start at these times of the year after moisture from winter and spring precipitation dries up. Vegetation and overall conditions are the hottest and driest in these periods. The increase of vegetation can make the fires spread easier.

== Fires ==
The 10th Street fire at East Wenatchee resulted in level 1 evacuations on May 27 and burned 250 acres (100 ha) of grass and sagebrush.

The Old Naches Highway fire incident was reported on June 7. It had burned almost 645 acres by June 8.

The 10,000 acre Hat Rock Fire in Oregon crossed into Walla Walla County on June 13, where it burned more than 1,000 acres before being contained.

Three fires in grass and sagebrush in Benton County burned 7,000 acres by June 16.

A wildfire under 100 acres (40 ha) near Lake Sutherland outside Olympic National Park was visible on June 18 from Victoria, British Columbia on the other side of the Strait of Juan de Fuca.

The Oasis Fire near Touchet grew to over 1,500 acres (610 ha) by June 19, bringing evacuation orders by Walla Walla County emergency managers. State firefighting resources including tanker aircraft were mobilized to fight it.

The Tunnel Five Fire started near Underwood in Skamania County on July 2. It burned 529 acres (214 ha) and was 80% contained by July 10.

The McEwan Fire started near Mason Lake, in Western Washington 30 miles (50 km) southwest of Seattle on July 2. As of July 5, 2023, it had caused evacuations of hundreds of homes, had burned over 250 acres (100 ha), and was uncontained.

The Eagle Bluff Fire started near Oroville, Washington, at about 2:00 pm PT on July 29, 2023. By July 29, the fire reached 10,000 acres; by July 30, with 15 aircraft were fighting it. The fire crossed into Canada on July 30–31 and Level 3 evacuations (leave now) were downgraded to level 1 and 2 evacuations. As of August 8, 2023 the fire burned a total of 34,049 acres (13,779 ha) between Canadian and US soil. The cause of the fire is still unknown and under an active investigation.The fire approached within kilometers of Osoyoos, British Columbia on July 31, and the entire town of Osoyoos was on evacuation alert. By July 30, three structures had been damaged or destroyed by the fire. Nearby highways, including U.S. Route 97, were temporarily closed. Three structures had been lost to the fire by June 30, and hundreds of residences threatened by the fire.

The North Cascades Highway was closed for several days due to the Sourdough Fire. Trailheads, trails, and camping in North Cascades National Park remained closed after the road reopened on August 9. The highway was closed again due to the fire's growth as well as the formation of the Blue Lake Fire. Smoke from this fire and other fires in inland Washington and British Columbia was pushed towards Western Washington and rapid convective mixing caused unhealthy air quality in Seattle on August 20–21.

The Gray Fire was ignited on August 18 near Medical Lake in Spokane County and grew to over 9,500 acres (3,800 ha) within a day. It prompted the evacuation of Medical Lake and parts of Cheney and shut down portions of Interstate 90 and State Route 902. One death was determined to be from the Gray Fire while another was caused by the nearby Oregon Road Fire.

The Oregon Fire began on the same day as the Gray Fire, August 18. Driven by hot, dry, gusty winds the fire grew rapidly. 126 homes were lost and one person was killed.

== List of wildfires ==
The following is a list of Washington wildfires in 2023 that burned more than 1,000 acres (400 hectares), resulted in casualties or significant damage to structures, or were otherwise notable. Acreage and containment figures may not be up to date.

Name	County	Acres	Start date	Containment date (Note: Containment means that fire crews have established and secured control lines around the fire's perimeter. These lines are artificial barriers, like trenches or cleared vegetation, designed to stop the fire's spread, or natural barriers like rivers. Containment reflects progress in managing the fire but does not necessarily mean the fire is starved of fuel, under control, or put out.)	Notes	Refs
Tunnel Five	Skamania	529	July 2	July 2023	Destroyed ten homes.	
Airplane Lake	Chelan	6,956	July 7	September 24		
Newell Road	Klickitat	60,551	July 21	July 29	Cause under investigation	
Eagle Bluff	Okanogan	34,049	July 29	August 8		
Sourdough	Whatcom	6,369	October 1			
Gray	Spokane	10,085	August 18	September 1	265 structures destroyed; one death reported<	
Oregon	Spokane	10,817	August 18	September 17	384 structures destroyed (126 homes); one death reported	
Olympic National Park Lightning Fires	Jefferson	4,795	September 1	October 18		
Blue Lake	Chelan	1,074	September 1	December 11		

== See also ==
- List of Washington wildfires
