= Oregon Fire =

2023 wildfire in Washington, U.S.

- Part of the 2023 Washington wildfires
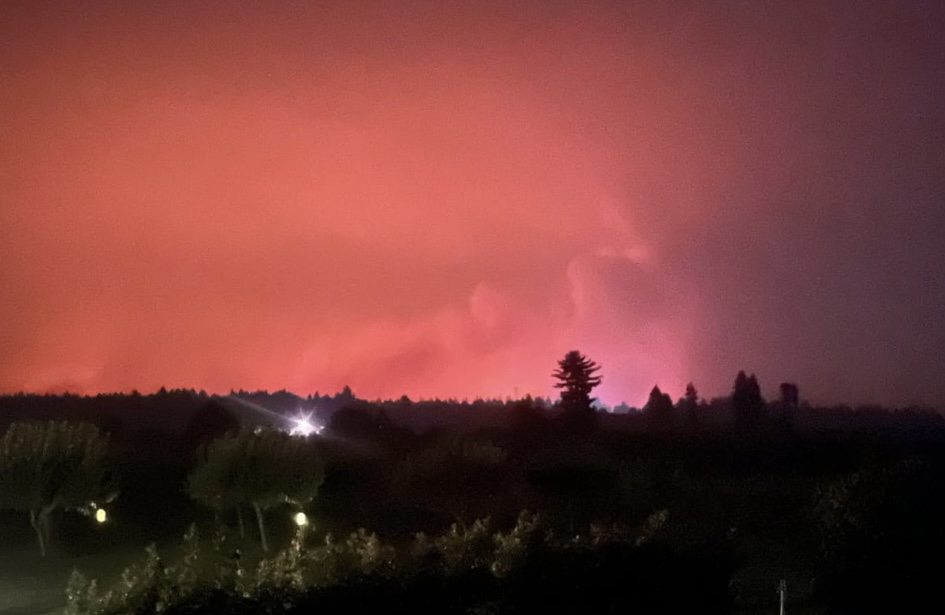
- The Oregon Fire, as seen from Bruce Rd on August 20th
- Date: August 18, 2023; 4:13PM
- Location: Near Elk, Washington, Spokane County, Washington, US
- Coordinates: 48°01′54.5″N 117°13′50.6″W

Statistics
- Burned area: 10,817 acres (4,377 ha)
- Land use: Agricultural, timber, recreation, residential/urban interface

Impacts
- Deaths: 1
- Structures lost: 384

Ignition
- Cause: Human caused, specifics under investigation

Map
- Perimeter of Oregon Fire (map data)

The Oregon Fire was a wildfire that burned in Spokane County, Washington and Pend Oreille County, Washington, United States. (While known in some social media circles and by some media outlets as the Oregon Road Fire, the official name is the Oregon Fire.) As of September 15, 2023, the fire had burned 10,817 acres (4,377 ha) and was 97% contained. In addition to burning 384 structures, 126 of which were primary residences, the death of one person was determined to be connected to the fire.

== History ==
=== August ===
Weather forecasters had predicted a warm, dry, and windy day on August 18. A red flag warning was issued at 8:51 am on August 18, 2023, in which National Weather Service Officials warned that wind gusts of up to 35 mph would create critical fire weather and cause fires to spread rapidly. The Oregon Fire began in Spokane County near the community of Elk at about 4:13 pm on August 18, 2023. High winds and low relative humidity caused extremely rapid fire growth.

On August 21 the remnants of Hurricane Hilary brought cooler temperatures and rainfall to the northwest. This significantly moderated fire behavior and allowed crews to make large gains in containment and structure damage assessments.

By August 29 all evacuations had been lifted.

=== September ===
Despite dry, warm weather returning immediately following the rainfall from Hurricane Hilary in late August no significant fire growth occurred. Cooler temperatures and another wet weather pattern over September 2 and 3 helped firefighters suppress remaining hotspots and make gains on overall containment. Public Information Officers reported that no new growth was expected and that fire crews would continue to strengthen containment lines.

On September 5 fire investigators reported that the fire was human-caused as all natural sources of ignition had been ruled out.

By the end of the month the fire was 100% contained and crews were working to extinguish hot spots in the interior of the fire perimeter.

== Cause ==
Officials have stated the fire is human caused. While the exact details are unknown the fire appears to have been caused by spontaneous combustion in improperly stored materials.

== Impact ==
=== Closures and evacuations ===
Level 3 evacuation orders were issued for large areas of unincorporated Spokane County and small portions of southern Pend Oreille County on August 18.

=== Damage ===
By September the fire had burned 384 structures, 126 of which were primary residences. Additionally, one person died due to the fire.

=== Air Pollution ===
Smoke, primarily from wildfires burning in Canada, as well as from the Oregon Fire and two other fires in Spokane County caused Spokane, Washington to have the worst air quality in the United States for two days, on August 19 and 20. Air quality index levels reached a peak level of 511 in Spokane in the morning of August 20.

=== Political ===
In response to the Oregon Fire and two other fires, the Spokane County Board of Commissioners issued a county-wide state of emergency declaration for Spokane County allowing state and federal assistance to come into Spokane County. Washington Governor Jay Inslee also issued a state of emergency for the fires which allows further assistance along with the activation of the Washington National Guard to assist in containment of the fires.

On August 20, the Washington state government's request to the Federal Emergency Management Agency (FEMA) for a Fire Management Assistance Grant was approved. The grant provides federal funds primarily to help with various firefighting costs.
