= 2023 Idaho wildfires =

Natural disasters in the United States

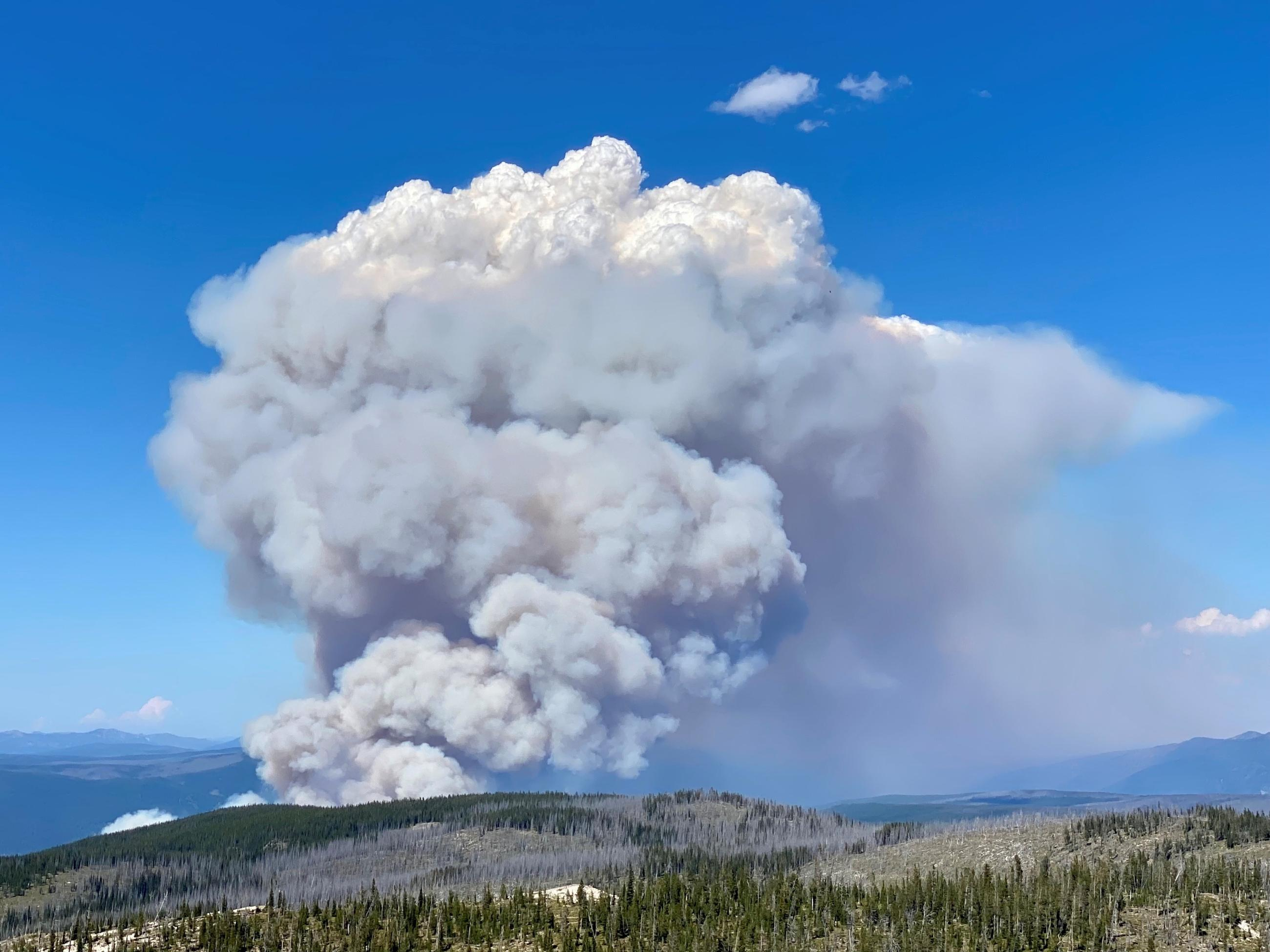
- Smoke from the Elkhorn Fire, viewed on July 30

Statistics
- Total fires: 892
- Total area: 87,801

The 2023 Idaho wildfire season was a series of wildfires that burned throughout the U.S. state of Idaho.

Predictions made by the National Interagency Fire Center (NIFC) at the start of the season forecast an above-average potential for most of Idaho. This elevated fire potential stemmed in part from two consecutive wet winters, which encouraged excessive brush and vegetation growth that later dried out under summer heat.

== Background ==
While the "fire season" in Idaho varies every year based on fire weather conditions, most wildfires occur from June to September. Fire activities normally increase in July and August because of drier conditions, hotter temperatures, and more lightning strikes from thunderstorms. However, wildfire severity can vary every year based on preseason conditions such as snowpack and the overcrowded growth of vegetation and dying trees.

== Summary ==
The 2023 Idaho wildfire season was relatively mild by historical standards. Across the state, a total of 87,801 acres burned—far below the 10-year average (~600,000 acres).

Although acreage was low, of the 284 wildfires reported statewide in 2023, 206 were attributed to human causes, versus 78 by lightning. Fire suppression costs were substantial, the Idaho Department of Lands reported $15.76 million (2023 USD) spent by late August, with net obligations (after reimbursements) of $13.53 million (2023 USD). Within the Idaho Department of Lands protected lands by August 28, 2023, wildfires consumed 80,956 acres (including federal, private, and state land breakdowns). Human-caused fires heavily outnumbered natural ignitions; officials noted that neglected campfires, debris burning, or other human activities were major contributors.

== List of wildfires ==
The following is a list of fires that burned more than 1,000 acres (400 ha), or produced significant structural damage or casualties.

Name	County	Acres	Start date	Containment date	Notes	Ref
Little Bear	Idaho	1,291	July 3		Lightning-caused. Burned 12 miles (19 km) west of Powell.	
Southtom	Ada	1,130	July 10	July 10	Burned 12 miles (19 km) south of Boise Airport.	
Hayden	Lemhi	24,706	July 19		Undetermined cause. Burned in Salmon-Challis National Forest.	
Elkhorn	Idaho	26,048	July 24		Caused by an improperly extinguished campfire that rekindled. Destroyed several structures in Frank Church River of No Return Wilderness.	
Ridge Creek	Kootenai	4,474	August 3	September 26	Undetermined cause. Prompted evacuations and closed Lake Hayden.	
East	Valley	3,313	August 16		Undetermined cause. Burned 10 miles (16 km) east of Cascade.	
Black Mountain	Twin Falls	1,312	August 20		Lightning-caused. Burned 23 miles (37 km) southeast of Twin Falls.	
Big Creek	Franklin	2,980	August 26	November 2	Lightning-caused. 18 miles (29 km) southwest of Montpelier.	
Telegraph	Lincoln	2,000	August 29	August 30	Burned 10 miles (16 km) north of Shoshone.	
Wedge	Blaine	7,375	September 9	September 10	Caused by a vehicle dragging an object on State Route 75.	

== See also ==
- 2023 Oregon wildfires
- 2023 Washington wildfires
