= Phillip Arnold Paul =

Phillip Arnold Paul is a man who was acquitted by reason of insanity of the 1987 slaying of Ruth Motley, 78, who was found in a shallow grave near her Lower Yakima Valley, Washington home. Paul, who lived nearby, claimed voices told him to "kill the witch on Emerald Road". To hide her scent from wild animals, he had soaked her in gasoline and buried her in her flower garden.

== Background ==
In August, 1990, Paul refused his medication and later escaped from Eastern State Hospital (ESH) but was arrested near Fishtrap, Washington. While being booked into the Spokane County Jail, he overpowered a Spokane County Sheriff's Office deputy, shattering the deputy's shoulder. A jury later ordered the state to pay the deputy more than $100,000.

Paul enrolled at Spokane Falls Community College in early 1992 and was allowed to leave ESH to attend classes. During the next two years he also worked part time at the Spokane Goodwill store and at an antique furniture shop downtown, sometimes for as many as thirty hours a week. A Yakima judge refused Paul's request for release from his court-ordered commitment at ESH in 1994. In 1998, he was allowed to leave the hospital to live with his parents in Yakima Valley, but had to return every two weeks to receive his medications.

In June, 2000, Paul was approved for a full-time return to his family home in Yakima Valley. By October, 2000, he was ordered back to ESH after counselors noticed threatening and delusional behavior, and Paul had made reference to someone he thought was a "witch."

After five more years in ESH, Paul was approved for a conditional release to The Carlyle, an assisted living facility in downtown Spokane, in 2005. He began dating a woman who became pregnant and had a baby boy in 2006. Paul was ordered to return to ESH because he refused to take his medications.

In 2007, he was again released to The Carlyle although counselors reported he was beginning to exhibit increasingly defiant behavior.

In January, 2009, Paul was ordered back to ESH after refusing to take his medications and for being seen in a pawnshop that sold firearms and other weapons, the possession of which was prohibited under the terms of his release.

In 1991, Paul walked away during a day trip to a lake in Washington and was later captured. On September 17, 2009, he escaped from a field trip organized by his mental hospital to the Spokane County Fair during an outing with 30 other Eastern State Hospital patients. Paul was then later captured without resistance, in Goldendale, Washington, on September 20, 2009.
