= Eastern State Hospital (Washington) =

- Washington State Department of Social and Health Services
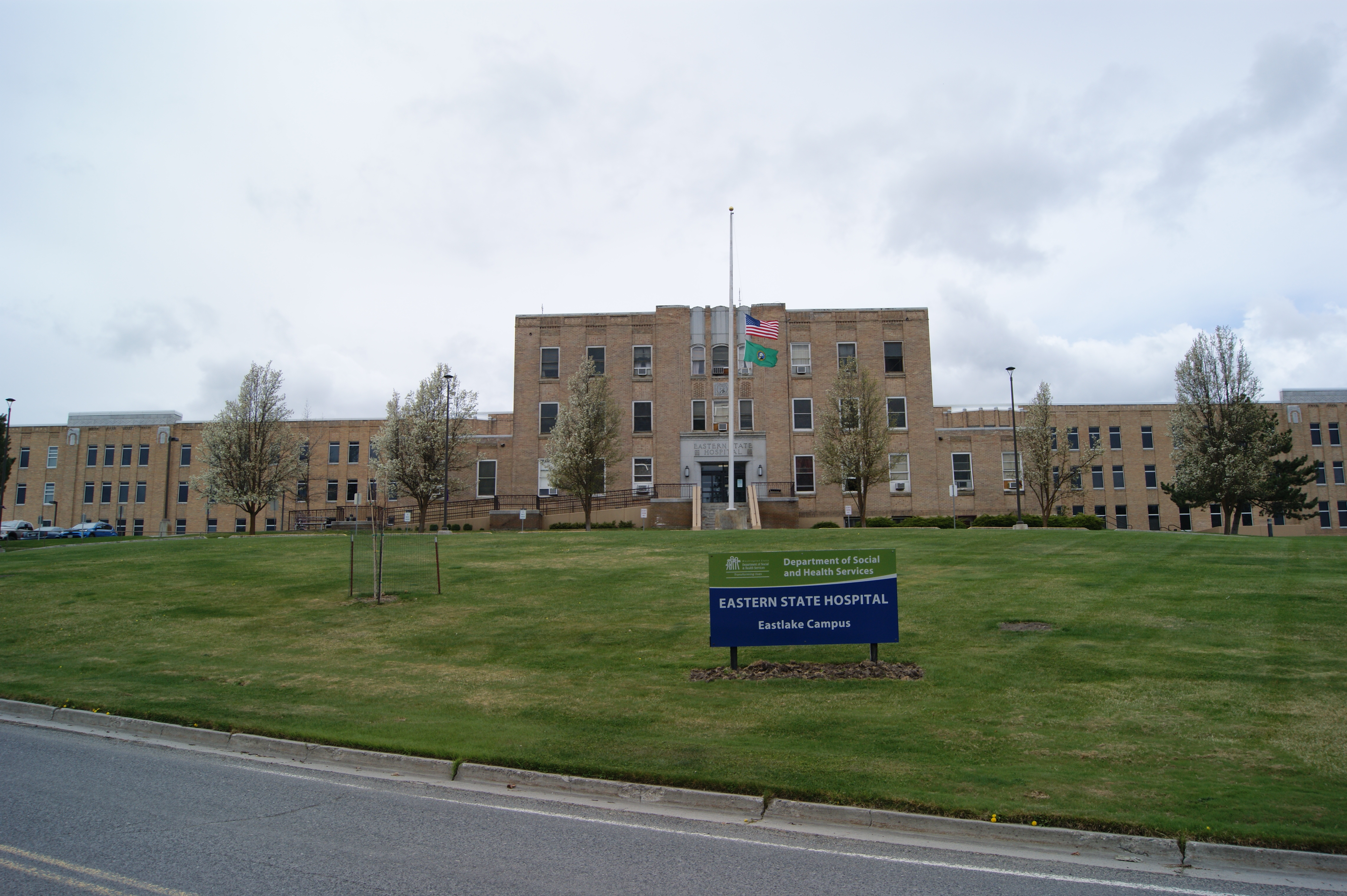
- Original hospital building, dated 1908

Geography
- Location: Medical Lake, Washington, United States
- Coordinates: 47.573°N 117.696°W

Organization
- Type: Psychiatric

Services
- Emergency department: No
- Beds: 367

History
- Founded: 1891

Links
- Website: dshs.wa.gov
- Lists: Hospitals in Washington state
- Other links: List of hospitals in Washington (state)

Eastern State Hospital is a psychiatric hospital established in 1891 in Medical Lake, a small community 20 miles (32 km) southwest of Spokane, Washington. The original building was a Kirkbride Plan, and the current building has a similar floor plan with male and female wings extending out from the main building.

A facility for the mentally ill in Washington State, it was commissioned by the Territorial Legislature in 1886 to ease overcrowding at Western State Hospital, which at the time was the only hospital for the mentally ill in the Washington Territory. Over the years, the hospital has been the subject of a number of scandals regarding the treatment of its patients and the quality, and effectiveness of the care provided. As a result of these scandals, the vast increase in scientific and medical understanding of mental illnesses and the methodologies of effective treatment thereof, the hospital has undergone numerous transitions in the past century.

The hospital continues to operate today as a treatment hospital, far from its origins as a state mandated custodial institution and more in line with the modern understanding of how best to treat mental illnesses and disorders. It is accredited with The Joint Commission (TJC).

== History ==
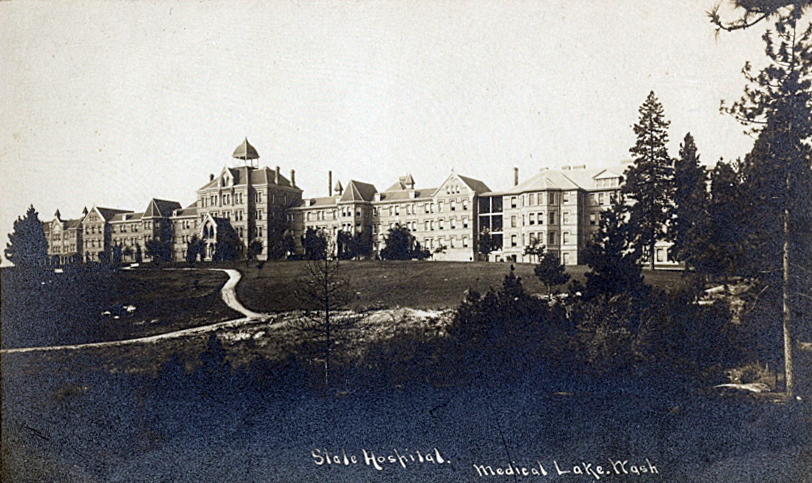
Eastern State Hospital in 1908.

In 1886, the Territorial Legislature authorized a Board of Commissioners to select a site for the establishment of a new hospital. After deliberation and hearings, the legislature designated Medical Lake as the site of the new hospital. This site was chosen for a number of reasons: it was on three rail lines and in close proximity to the train station in Cheney; citizens donated the land for the site; it had an ample drinking water supply, and at the time the lake was widely believed to have healing properties. By March 1891, the first building of the hospital was completed. At four stories tall, 400 feet long, and made of bright red brick, the Eastern State Hospital for the Insane (as it was then known) was hailed as "one of the most handsome and imposing buildings in the state" and "one of the finest structures on the Pacific coast" by observers. After staff hiring, the first patients arrived in May, and the hospital has been in operation ever since.

=== 19th century founding ===
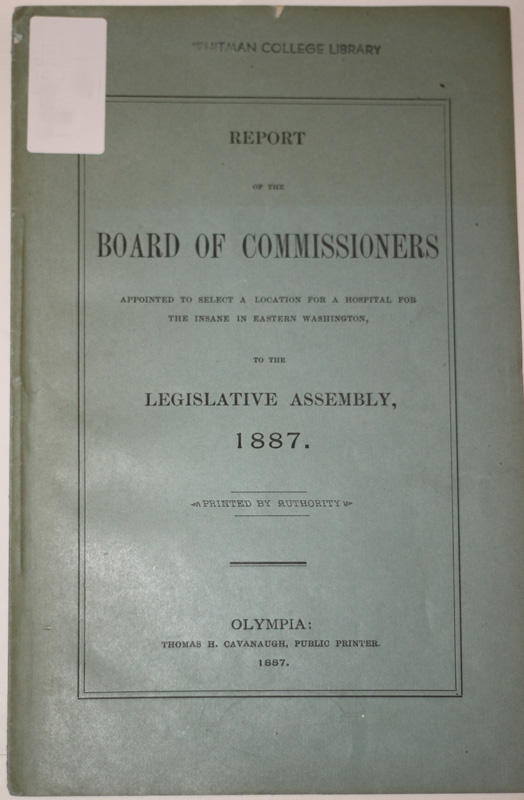
Board of Commissioners Report selecting a site for and authorizing the construction of Eastern State Hospital

In 1887, following a territorial legislative session in Olympia, Thomas H. Cavanaugh and Secretary Charles W. Clarke issued their summary report, the Report of the Board of Commissioners Appointed to Select a Location for A Hospital for the Insane in Eastern Washington to the Legislative Assembly. The report details the search and evaluation for a site to construct an insane asylum in eastern Washington State by the Board of Commissioners and how Medical Lake was the preferred location. The report is addressed to the Council and House of Representatives of the Territory of Washington.

There were many reasons for the board to choose Medical Lake as the site of their new hospital. The land itself had much to offer, with a permanent spring, an abundance of building materials such as timber and granite, and numerous terraces for building sites. The spring would be used as clean drinking water while the nearby lake would be used for lavatory and medical uses. In addition to this, the citizens of Medical Lake proposed to donate a quarter section of the land should the hospital be built at the Medical Lake site, quoted at the time $100 an acre.

Other sites were visited by the board in the towns of Yakima, Walla Walla, Waitsburg, Dayton, Pomeroy, and Colfax, none of which were considered as desirable as the site at Medical Lake. The Yakima site was quoted at $50 an acre while the Walla Walla, Waitsburg, Dayton, Pomeroy, and Colfax sites were between $10–25 an acre. Medical Lake was more expensive and in 1887 relatively inaccessible to major railways. However, this was not reason enough for commissioners T.J. Smith, G.J. Hill, and Charles W. Clarke to think of any other location as the best suited to construct the hospital.

=== Modern era ===
As of 2016, Eastern State Hospital has a patient capacity of 287 beds. These are broken up into three different units: 91 in the Adult Psychiatric Unit, 101 in the Geropsychiatric Unit, and 95 in the Forensic Services Unit. Each of the three units maintains a very specific function. The Adult Psychiatric Unit serves adults who are experiencing acute or chronic psychiatric illness. The Geropsychiatric Unit serves adults age 50 and over and those who have special medical and/or physical needs. The Forensic Services Unit provides evaluation and treatment for adults referred to the hospital by the judicial system and runs the Community Competency Evaluation Program. Additionally, the hospital seeks to embed itself in the local community. It does so in a variety of ways. For instance, Eastern State Hospital partners with several colleges and universities in the region to offer graduate program experiences for students. It also holds occasional workshops and allows visitors on any given day, in compliance with its visiting hours and requirements (Washington State, "Eastern State Hospital").

== Evolution of treatment procedures ==
The approach to psychiatric care at Eastern State Hospital has changed over time, reflecting the changes in understanding of mental health in the more than 100 years since the hospital’s founding. The different approaches to psychiatric care at the hospital can be divided into four distinct phases: Custodial Care phase, the "Patient-is-problem" phase, the Chemotherapy phase, and the current "Community Mental Health Movement" phase.

=== Custodial care ===
The custodial care phase represents the first five decades of the hospital’s operations. The main emphasis of this phase was the isolation or "asylum" of patients, separating them physically from the world to simplify patient lives and to protect those in the community. It also protected them from the community, as mental illness was heavily ostracized and stigmatized in those days; though there is still a significant stigma today, it is much less than around the start of the 20th century. At this point in history there was little to no understanding of the nature of mental illness; considered causes of illness at the time were "age, tobacco, constipation, whiskey, and morphia[sic]," and any person seen as problematic (alcoholics, the intellectually disabled, those suffering depression, criminals) were placed in the hospital.

Treatments were targeted at symptoms, and many of those treatments were completely ineffective. Such treatments included religious actions (prayer, exorcisms, forced religious study, etc.), physical restraint, and other punishments. The hospital suffered severe overcrowding, and was very understaffed in this period, with a single attendant being responsible for 40-50 patients, working in 12-hour shifts, with a total of 800 patients in the original building. Over time, 22 new buildings would be added to the hospital complex and the population peaked at 2,274 in 1954. Many of these new buildings were the result of Works Project Administration spending during the Depression, which sought to both create jobs and to ease the overcrowding.

A significant development in therapy came in the 1930s. Daisy Lewis, an attendant, gave an insulin shot to a woman who didn’t recognize her husband nor daughter and was "completely oblivious to reality." The effects wore off shortly and treatment was repeated, but it gave hope that there was something that could be done for patients. Despite the positive results such treatments had for some, they had numerous negative effects on patient health. Different kinds of convulsive therapies, or "shock therapies" (insulin shock, metrazol shock, electroshock), were used for all manner of patients, as these were the only treatments with any consistent efficacy yet discovered (though they were only truly effective on a small number). The overuse is clear in the hospital’s statement: "During a two year period in the early 1950s, over 1,100 patients received one of the convulsive therapies; altogether, about 15,000 treatments were administered."

In World War II, treatments turned into "work therapy" for all those not residing in locked wards, or roughly 80% of the total patient population. Patients worked between two and eight hours a day on a variety of tasks, including baking, farming, sewing, gardening, cobbling, landscaping, housekeeping, cooking, and many others. After a day’s work, patients received either group or individual counseling; this counseling focused on correcting perceived moral or religious deficiencies, which were seen as the cause of a "demented" condition.

This period of hospital history (as in many other mental health facilities) is regarded as a low point, and even hospital officials have stated that it "must have been a frightening place through [those] decades." Through the first five decades of the hospital’s history, the number of patients rose steadily, and most of them never left the hospital. Concerns were raised when so many patients were being admitted, and so few were being reintegrated into the community; the effectiveness of any treatment was cast into severe doubt.

=== "Patient-is-problem" phase ===
Such concerns over the hospital’s retention rates of patients led to the next phase of treatment styles at the hospital, the "patient-is-problem" phase, from 1941 to 1954. Treatment began to incorporate Freudian theory of the causes of mental illness, and focused on an individual patient’s thought processes, formative experiences, and genetic factors. A significant factor in this approach came from returning World War II soldiers and medics, who had front line experience of mental trauma caused by war. On the front lines, these groups developed methods for first-response, short-term crisis therapy for those in distress to allow them to return to the battlefield. This interest in understanding mental illnesses increased as group therapies were found to be effective, and research by military medical personnel and social workers increased through both World War II and the Korean War (1951–1954).

=== Chemotherapy phase ===
The third reworking of hospital treatment policies began in the mid-1950s, ushered in by the new availability of psychotropic drugs. While some saw the new use of pills to treat mental illness as little more than "chemical strait jackets," they allowed a large number of patients to be released and begin their reintegration into the community. As the hospital’s 12th superintendent Dr. G. Lee Sandritter stated, "as long as we hang on to a patient, he won’t get well." Thus, the new policy was for patients to be kept in the hospital only as long as medically necessary before being released and reintegrated. Sandritter was fired in his 2nd year amidst much controversy. The Spokesman Review had run a number of articles alleging misconduct at the hospital under his supervision, including runaways and sexual misconduct between staff and patients. It is unclear how much of these allegations were based in fact, and how many were generated by the hysteria over Sandritter’s loosening of hospital policies confining patients; the primary sources of the accusations were "disgruntled employees," according to official hospital literature.

These liberalizing policies were continued by Sandritter’s successor, Dr. Harris Bunnell. A volunteer program was started to help integrate the hospital with the public, and in 1965 over 2400 visitors came to the hospital, helping to lessen the "asylum" stigma that had plagued it for so long. The patient population was also falling dramatically; by 1970, the hospital was at a quarter of its peak 1950s numbers at around 500 patients, a number not seen by the hospital since 1907. Treatment responsibilities for released patients were delegated to Community Mental Health centers, which were established locally under guidelines established by federal legislation.

=== The Community Mental Health Movement ===
This phase, which continues today, was catalyzed by new legislation in Congress. The Mental Health Study Act, passed by Congress in 1955, established the Joint Commission on Mental Illness and Mental Health to evaluate mental health treatment in the United States. The commission’s recommendations for reforms were incorporated, in large part into the 1963 Community Mental Health Act. This act provided federal grants to state and municipal governments to establish community mental health centers to deal with outpatient treatment of the mentally ill.

Many were not accepting of the newly released mentally ill in their communities, and discrimination was fairly common and institutional: released patients could not vote nor hold driver’s licenses, despite having been declared "sane." This changed in 1974, when the Washington State Legislature passed laws guaranteeing equal constitutional rights for patients. Treatment of the mentally ill today is increasingly done on an outpatient basis, and ESH focuses predominantly on more severe cases, as well as providing a space for group therapy and workshops. The hospital today has room for 312 patients, and has roughly 700 staff; nearly 100 patients are admitted on a monthly basis.

== Notable Escapes ==
=== Phillip A. Paul ===
The most recent, and perhaps most famous, escape from Eastern State Hospital occurred on September 17, 2009. Hospital employees took a group of 31 forensic ward patients on a supervised field trip to the Spokane County Interstate Fair. One of these patients, 47-year-old Phillip A. Paul of Goldendale, Washington, wandered away from the group and could not be located by hospital staff. A paranoid schizophrenic, Paul was found not guilty by reason of insanity in the murder of a Sunnyside, Washington woman in 1987. Supervisors on the field trip waited two hours before alerting authorities of Paul's escape. During an extensive search of the fairgrounds immediately following the notification of the escape deputies concluded Paul had already left the premises. While the fairgrounds were not shut down during the search, upon hearing of the escape, fairgoers were angered by the decision to bring a criminally insane patient to such a populated community event.

Paul was found and taken back into custody just outside Goldendale three days after escaping at the fair. Spokane County Sheriff Ozzie Knezovich said Paul conned a friend into giving him a ride from Spokane to Goldendale. Three Spokane deputies made the arrest after Paul tried to hitch a ride in their undercover and unmarked van. At the time of his arrest, Paul was reportedly carrying a backpack with food, clothing, and personal items, as well as a guitar, sleeping bag, and hand scythe.

==== Aftermath ====
Outrage ensued amongst community members and law enforcement officials in the area because they claimed a man with Paul's criminal history and condition should not be permitted to go on hospital field trips. In fact, the escape during the Spokane County Interstate Fair was not Paul's first escape from the hospital. In 1990, Paul escaped from Eastern State Hospital and upon his detainment assaulted a Spokane County sheriff's deputy. Paul was charged with first-degree escape and second-degree assault for the incident. The deputy Paul assaulted during his first escape was also one of the deputies who later detained him during his second escape.

But while the worry and angst was alleviated with Paul's recapture, the anger and bewilderment of community members and authorities remained center stage. For their part, Eastern State Hospital officials justified its decision to allow for Paul's inclusion in the field trip by pointing to his recent behavior. Then-head of Eastern State Hospital Hal Wilson called Paul "a fairly model patient" and claimed "he's not acted out in any way". This did little to alleviate the seriousness of the matter however. Furthermore, state records show the staff at Eastern State Hospital has been supervising community outings for criminally committed patients for several years because it allows them to observe how the patient interacts with society.

In the aftermath of Paul's escape, there was much fallout for Eastern State Hospital. First, Wilson resigned from his post as the chief executive officer of the hospital. In his resignation letter to Susan Dreyfus, the secretary of the Washington State Department of Social and Health Services, Wilson explained, "hopefully, this will move to help signify that a change in leadership at the hospital is being taken and that new vision and direction can be brought forth to lead the hospital" ("News Release: Eastern State Hospital CEO") In addition, seven undisclosed Eastern State Hospital employees were disciplined for Paul's escape. Richard Kellogg, director of the Washington State Division of Mental Health Systems, said none of the seven employees were fired for their role in the incident, however. Kellogg claimed the punishments stem from failures by the employees to properly assess patient risks and for the untimely manner in which employees contacted authorities following the escape. Finally, Kellogg and Dreyfus vowed to overhaul the group community outings from the forensic ward, limiting groups to four people and following strict restrictions.

In all, while escapes have not been a major problem throughout the history of Eastern State Hospital, Paul's escape in 2009 sent shockwaves throughout Washington's mental health community, law enforcement officers, and the community as a whole. Steps have been taken to try to limit or prevent future escape attempts from the state's mental health institutions.

Some clarification should be made regarding the term "escape" as it relates to Eastern State Hospital. Patients are categorized by their level of response to treatment and by the type of commitment they are serving. A civil commitment or a criminal commitment. The patients that are part of a civil commitment are allowed privileges such as, open campus, short term unsupervised leaves and more. Depending on the level assigned a patient gains more freedom. While the term "Escape" may be used infrequently as it relates to the hospital, "Walk Away's" happen on a regular basis. Patients do walk away from Eastern and local Law Enforcement are requested to search for them. Patients at Eastern as part of a criminal commitment are in a secure "Forensic Services Unit" the term "escape" perhaps fits these patients better, Patients in a civil commitment do walk away regularly. Most patients of Eastern have been placed there because they are a danger to themselves, however often those civil commitments include patients that are a danger to others as well.
