= 2023 Arizona wildfires =

Natural disasters in the USA

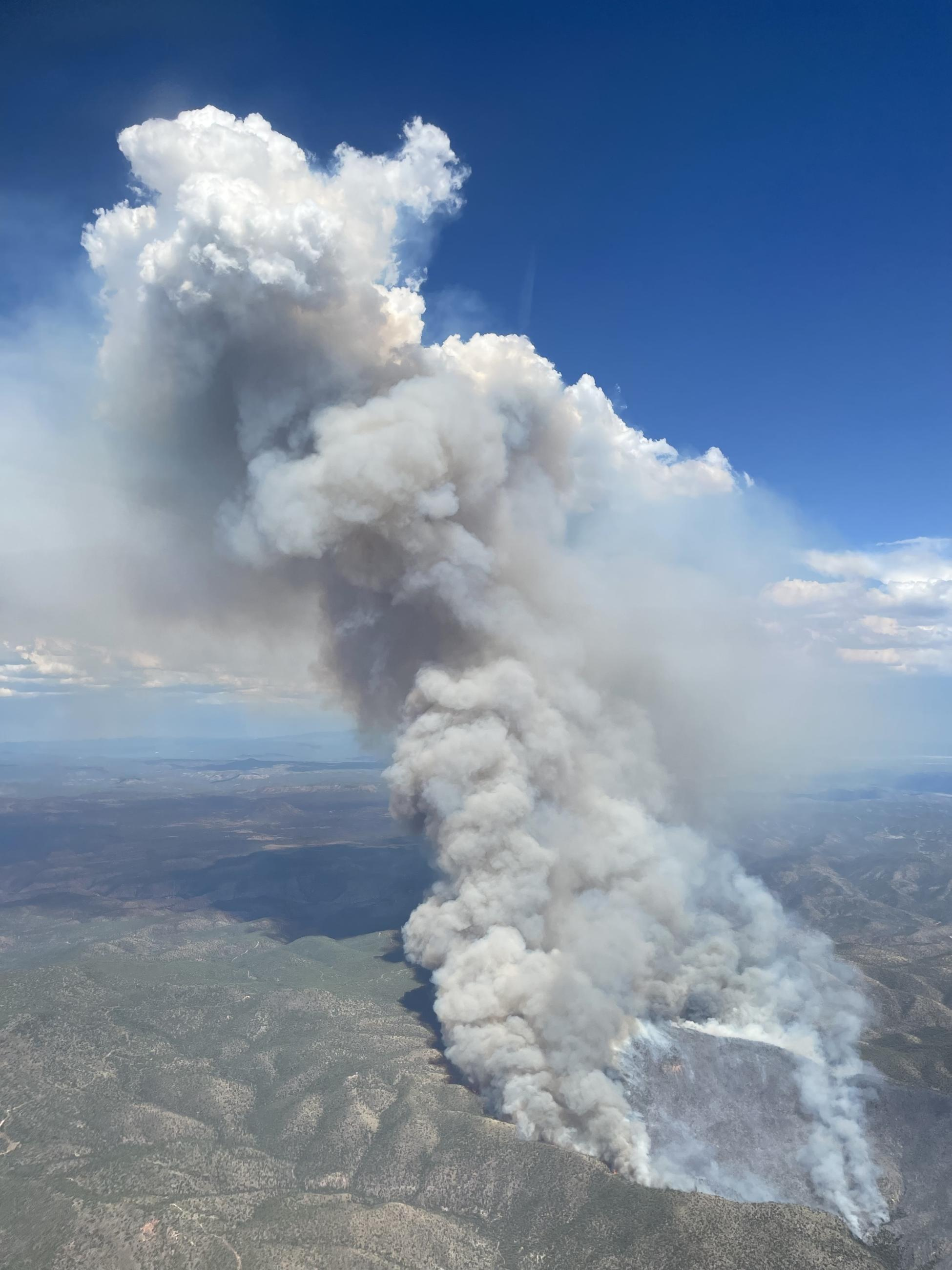
- Aerial view of the Spoon Fire on July 28

Statistics
- Total fires: 1,837
- Total area: 188,483 acres (76,276 ha)

Impacts
- Cost: $9,597,838 (2023 USD) (suppression efforts)

A series of wildfires burned throughout the U.S. state of Arizona in 2023.

== Background ==
Historically, while peak fire times were from June to July before monsoon season, wildfires now occur at any time of year. Wildfire conditions are influenced by heavy drought and dryness in the state, but snowmelt in the mountains leads to vegetation growth. With decreasing precipitation in spring, fires tend to start earlier. Monsoons affect fire conditions, with above-average monsoons hindering fires and below-average allowing them to spread. Dryness common in Arizona quickly dries out vegetation, allowing dangerous fire conditions.

== List of wildfires ==
The following is a list of fires that burned more than 1,000 acres (400 ha), or produced significant structural damage or casualties.

Name	County	Acres	Start date	Containment date (Note: Containment means that fire crews have established and secured control lines around the fire's perimeter. These lines are artificial barriers, like trenches or cleared vegetation, designed to stop the fire's spread, or natural barriers like rivers. Containment reflects progress in managing the fire but does not necessarily mean the fire is starved of fuel, under control, or put out.)	Notes	Ref
Volunteer	Coconino	2,675	May 23	2023		
Bullet	Maricopa	3,240	June 4	June 2023		
Ridge	Coconino	10,210	June 4	August 22		
Diamond	Maricopa	1,960	June 27	2023		
Beehive	Santa Cruz	10,745	June 30	2023		
Pilot	Yavapai and Mohave	34,810	July 1	August 3	Human caused.	
Campbell	Greenlee	1,416	July 10	2023		
Adams Robles Complex Fire	Cochise	5,232	July 19	July 2023		
Guzzler	Coconino	1,542	July 19	2023	Lightning-caused. Burned about 15 miles (24 km) northwest of Heber-Overgaard in Apache-Sitgreaves National Forest.	
Grapevine	Yavapai	1,049	July 21	August 9		
Diamond	Maricopa	1,960	July 22	July 2023		
Round Hill	Pima	3,000	July 22	2023		
Eskiminzin	Pinal	1,113	July 23	2023		
Gallineta	Pima	1,601	July 23	2023		
Spoon	Gila	4,560	July 24	2023	Lightning-caused. Burned 26 miles (42 km) west of Whiteriver.	
Gold Hill	Coconino	6,239	July 27	2023	Naturally-caused. Burned 20 miles (32 km) northwest of Cameron.	
Valentine	Gila	7,724	August 16	December 1	Lightning-caused. Burned 11 miles (18 km) of Young. Suppression efforts cost $10 million.	

== See also ==
- 2023 Colorado wildfires
- 2023 California wildfires
- 2023 New Mexico wildfires
- 2023 Utah wildfires
