= 2023 Colorado wildfires =

Natural disasters in the USA

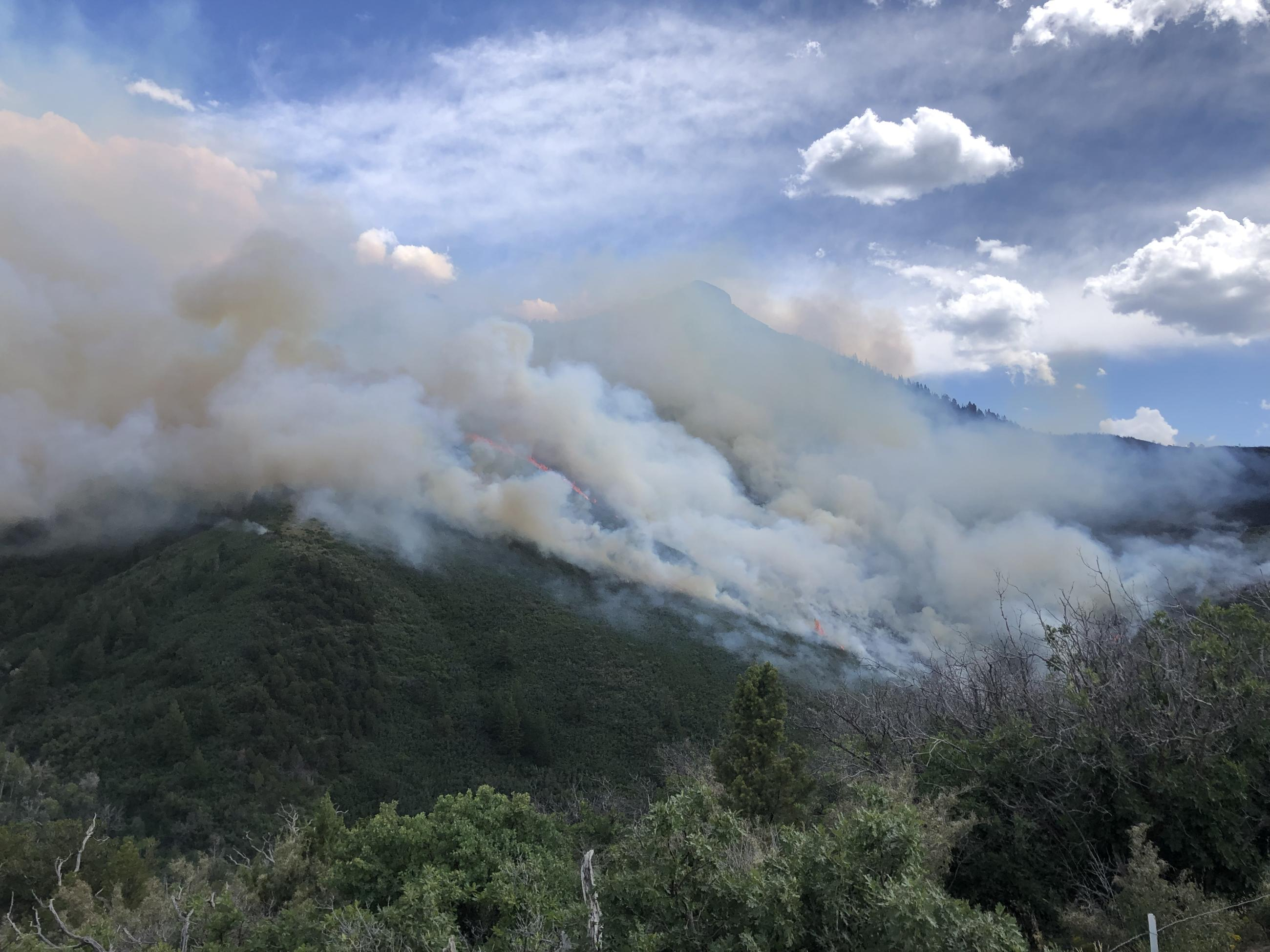
- The Spring Creek Fire on July 6

Statistics
- Total fires: 6,503
- Total area: 16,190 acres (6,550 ha)

Impacts
- Cost: Unknown

The 2023 Colorado wildfire season was a series of wildfires that have been burning throughout the U.S. state of Colorado.

== Background ==
While "fire season" varies every year based on different weather conditions, most wildfires occur between May and September with a fire risk year-round with an increasing danger during winter. Drought and decreasing snowpack levels and lowering snowmelt and runoff increase fire risk. These conditions, along with increased temperatures and decreased humidity, are becoming more common from climate change. Vegetation growth provides an ample fuel for fires. From 2011 to 2020, Colorado experiences an average of 5,618 wildfires each year that collectively burn about 237,500 acres (96,100 ha).

== List of wildfires ==
The following is a list of fires that burned more than 1,000 acres (400 ha), or produced significant structural damage or casualties.

Name	County	Acres	Start date	Containment date (Note: Containment means that fire crews have established and secured control lines around the fire's perimeter. These lines are artificial barriers, like trenches or cleared vegetation, designed to stop the fire's spread, or natural barriers like rivers. Containment reflects progress in managing the fire but does not necessarily mean the fire is starved of fuel, under control, or put out.)	Notes	Ref
403	Gunnison	1,096	March 31	April 13	The National Centers for Environmental Information (NCEI) did not document information about this wildfire.	
Gageby Creek	Bent	4,600	April 19	April 28	The National Centers for Environmental Information (NCEI) did not document information about this wildfire.	
Spring Creek	Garfield	3,256	July 24	October 1		
Lowline	Gunnison	1,999	July 26	December 13	Lightning-caused.	
Bear Creek	Hinsdale	1,093	July 28	2023	Caused by lightning about 20 miles (32 km) northwest of Pagosa Springs.	
Little Mesa	Delta	4,009	July 31	September 20		
Quartz Ridge	Archuleta	2,850	August 5	October 30		
Dry Lake	Archuleta	1,372	August 30	September 12		
Hope	Montezuma	1,290	September 21	October 7	Lightning-caused. Burned 9 miles (14 km) northwest of Dolores.	
Iron	Moffat	7,392	September 29	October 5	Undetermined cause. Burned 18 miles (29 km) northwest of Craig.	
Trail Springs	Archuleta	1,358	October 23	2023	Lighting-caused. Burned 12 miles (19 km) northwest of Pagosa Springs. Was 44% contained on November 24.	

== See also ==
- Colorado State Forest Service
- List of Colorado wildfires
- 2023 Arizona wildfires
- 2023 New Mexico wildfires
- 2023 Utah wildfires
