= Washington State Route 902 =

State highway in Spokane County, Washington, US

State Route 902
- Gold Star Memorial Highway

Route information
- Auxiliary route of I-90
- Maintained by WSDOT
- Length: 12.40 mi (19.96 km)
- Existed: 1964–present

Major junctions
- West end: I-90 / US 395 near Medical Lake
- East end: I-90 / US 395 near Medical Lake

Location
- Country: United States
- State: Washington
- County: Spokane

Highway system
- State highways in Washington; Interstate; US; State; Scenic; Pre-1964; 1964 renumbering; Former
| ← SR 900 | → SR 903 |

State Route 902 (SR 902), also named the Gold Star Memorial Highway, is a state highway located entirely in Spokane County, Washington, United States. It forms a 12-mile (19 km) loop that connects Medical Lake and Eastern State Hospital to Interstate 90 (I-90) at both ends. The highway has existed since at least 1931, and before the 1964 state highway renumbering, it was numbered Secondary State Highway 11D.

== Route description ==
SR 902 forms a 12-mile (19 km) loop between two interchanges on I-90, a major freeway between Seattle and Spokane that is concurrent with U.S. Route 395 (US 395) through part of Eastern Washington. Its western terminus is at I-90 exit 264, an interchange south of Clear Lake; the roadway continues east beyond the freeway to Cheney as Salnave Road. The highway travels around wetlands at the end of the lake and turns north to traverse part of a prairie. SR 902 passes Lakeland Village, an educational facility for developmentally disabled people, and enters the city of Medical Lake.

The highway passes Eastern State Hospital, a state psychiatric facility, and continues northeast to follow the shore of Medical Lake. SR 902 turns north onto Lefevre Street, which travels through the city to a junction with Brooks Road near Medical Lake High School. The highway turns east onto Brooks Road, which continues west to the Washington State Veterans Cemetery, and follows a section of the Washington Eastern Railroad out of the city. SR 902 passes the north end of Silver Lake and traverses a prairie on the south side of Fairchild Air Force Base. The highway turns due east near a roundabout with Craig Road and approaches Spokane International Airport. At a roundabout with Geiger Boulevard, SR 902 turns southeast and terminates at an interchange with I-90 and US 395 near several truck stops and distribution centers. The dogbone interchange comprises two roundabouts and a four-lane overpass split between two structures.

SR 902 is maintained by the Washington State Department of Transportation (WSDOT), which conducts an annual survey on state highways to measure traffic volume in terms of annual average daily traffic. Average traffic volumes on the highway in 2016 ranged from a minimum of 1,500 vehicles at its western terminus near Clear Lake to a maximum of 11,000 at its eastern terminus. It is officially designated as the Gold Star Memorial Highway, named for the gold star service banner displayed by families of deceased soldiers.

== History ==
The first roadway linking now I-90/US 395 and Medical Lake first appeared on maps in 1931. By the 1933 map, the remainder of the highway was present, linking back to I-90/US 395. Prior to the 1964 state highway renumbering, SR 902 was numbered Secondary State Highway 11D, a branch of Primary State Highway 11, the predecessor to US 395 through the region.

An interchange with I-90 east of Medical Lake was completed and opened to traffic in 1965 as part of the freeway's construction between Four Lakes and Spokane. In 1989, the state government completed reconstruction of the eastern 8 miles (13 km) of SR 902, which included wider shoulders and new guardrails. The highway was extended south from Lakeland Village to the Salnave Road interchange in 1991.

WSDOT installed centerline rumble strips to the rural sections of SR 902 in 2009 as part of safety improvements to several highways in Spokane County. The first roundabout on the highway, at Craig Road, was added during a repaving project in 2018 following several collisions at the old intersection. Three more roundabouts were constructed as part of a project to rebuild the eastern interchange with I-90 to address increased congestion from new homes and businesses in the area. A second overpass with a shared-use path opened alongside the roundabouts in 2021 at a cost of $20 million.

SR 902 was designated as the Gold Star Memorial Highway by a unanimous vote of the Washington State Transportation Commission in September 2020. The highway was chosen due to its role as the primary access to the Washington State Veterans Cemetery; a set of signs were dedicated in March 2021.

== Major intersections ==
The entire highway is in Spokane County.

| Location | mi | km | Destinations | Notes |
|---|---|---|---|---|
| | 0.00 | 0.00 | I-90 / US 395 – Seattle, Spokane | Interchange |
| | 12.40 | 19.96 | I-90 / US 395 – Seattle, Spokane | Interchange |
1.000 mi = 1.609 km; 1.000 km = 0.621 mi
