= Medical Lake, Washington =

City in Washington, United States

Medical Lake
- City
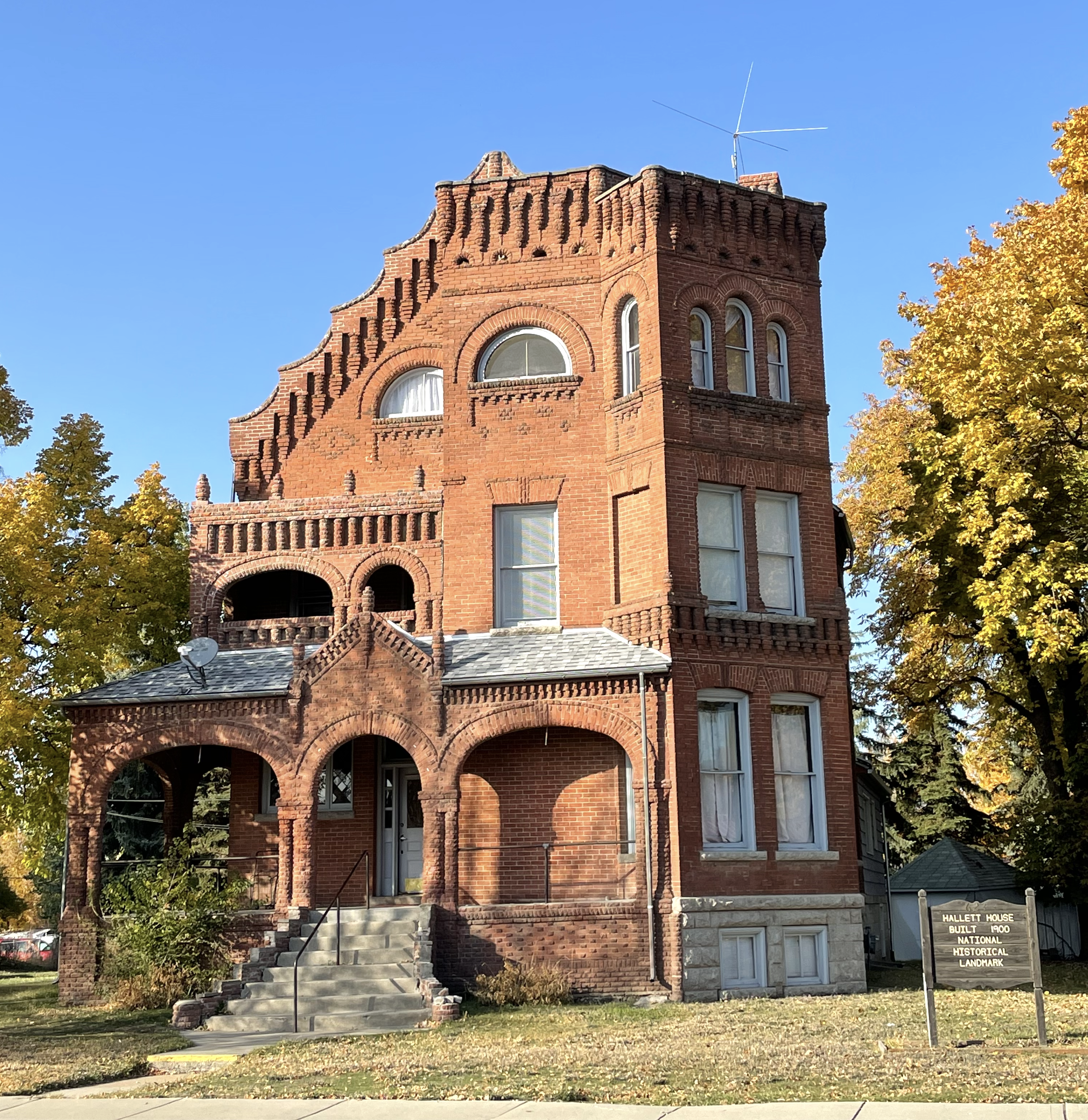
- The Historic Hallett House

- Location of Medical Lake, Washington
- Coordinates: 47°34′16″N 117°41′21″W
- Country: United States
- State: Washington
- County: Spokane

Government
  - Type: Mayor–council
  - Mayor: Terri Cooper

Area
  - Total: 3.58 sq mi (9.3 km^{2})
  - Land: 3.37 sq mi (8.7 km^{2})
  - Water: 0.21 sq mi (0.54 km^{2})
- Elevation: 2,408 ft (734 m)

Population (2020)
  - Total: 4,874
  - Estimate (2022): 5,016
  - Density: 1,488.43/sq mi (574.69/km^{2})
- Time zone: UTC-8 (Pacific (PST))
  - Summer (DST): UTC-7 (PDT)
- ZIP code: 99022
- Area code: 509
- FIPS code: 53-44690
- GNIS feature ID: 2411070
- Website: medical-lake.org

Medical Lake is a small city in Spokane County, eastern Washington, United States. At the 2020 census, the population was 4,874. The city is the site of a psychiatric hospital, Eastern State Hospital, and of Fairchild Air Force Base, two major employers.

== History ==
The city of Medical Lake was incorporated in 1890. The city took its name from the nearby eponymous lake.

The Spokane people, a Native American tribe which had long inhabited the area, believed the water and mud of the lake to possess curative properties.

White settlers such as Andrew Lefevre and Stanley Hallett, who moved to the area in the 1870s, promoted this belief and marketed the lake salts for medicinal uses. A salt and soap industry developed here, followed by the construction of commercial bath houses in the 1880s. This was a period when springs and spas were popular developments across the country.

Several resort hotels were constructed along the lake shore. In 1891, the state constructed Eastern State Hospital, and this further stimulated economic growth in the city. Such growth continued until the 1920s, when the lake declined in popularity as a tourist destination.

A period of stagnation was interrupted in the 1940s with the construction of nearby Fairchild Air Force Base to support the US effort in World War II. This brought a surge of population to the city. Medical Lake's economy continues to depend upon the institutional presence of Eastern State Hospital and Fairchild AFB. Many residents of the city commute to work in nearby Spokane, which has a more varied economy.

In 1957, the U.S. Army established a Nike missile silo and command site near the town, designated F-45. It was decommissioned in 1966 and the site was later redeveloped into a residential area.

Several parts of the city were destroyed by the Gray Fire, a wildfire that began on August 18, 2023, and burned over 9,500 acres (3,800 ha) and 185 structures in the area. Medical Lake and Eastern State Hospital were evacuated and portions of nearby highways were closed to traffic for several days.

== Geography ==
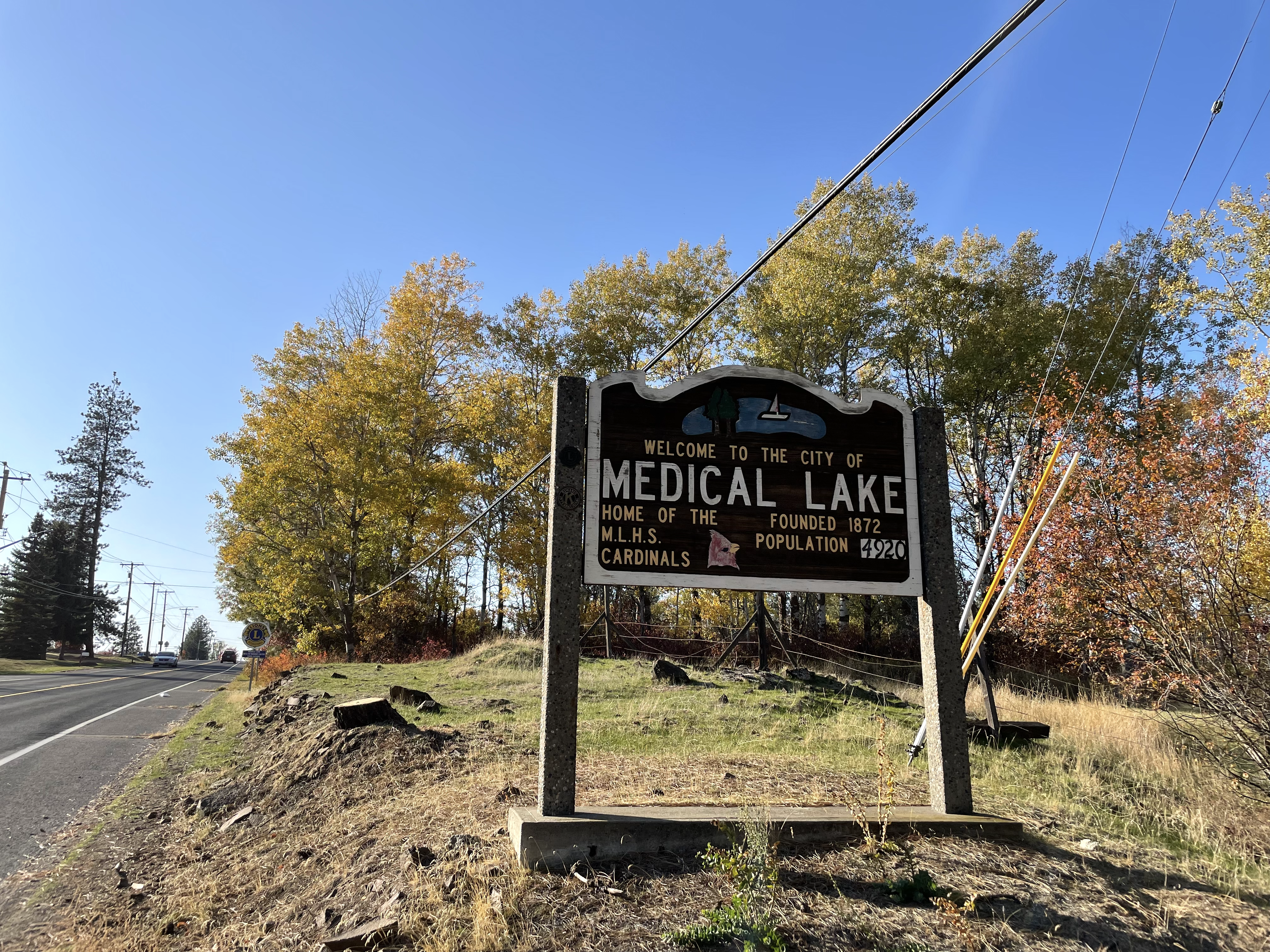
Welcome to Medical Lake sign on Lake Street

According to the United States Census Bureau, the city has a total area of 3.64 square miles (9.43 km^{2}), of which, 3.40 square miles (8.81 km^{2}) is land and 0.24 square miles (0.62 km^{2}) is water.

The city lies to the east of the lake of the same name. There are many other lakes within a few miles of the city, including West Medical Lake, Silver Lake, Clear Lake, and numerous smaller lakes and ponds south of the city. Driving distance from downtown Spokane is 16 miles via Interstate 90 and Washington State Route 902, the latter of which runs through the city. Eastern State Hospital is situated across the lake to the west. Fairchild Air Force Base is located immediately north of the city.

Geologically, the city lies on basalt flows that were heavily eroded by catastrophic flooding at the end of the last Ice Age, making the city and its environs a part of the Channeled Scablands terrain.

== Demographics ==
Historical population
Census	Pop.	Note	%±
1890	617		—
1900	516		−16.4%
1910	1,730		235.3%
1920	1,254		−27.5%
1930	1,671		33.3%
1940	2,114		26.5%
1950	4,488		112.3%
1960	4,765		6.2%
1970	3,529		−25.9%
1980	3,600		2.0%
1990	3,664		1.8%
2000	3,758		2.6%
2010	5,060		34.6%
2020	4,874		−3.7%
2022 (est.)	5,016		2.9%
U.S. Decennial Census; 2015 Estimate

=== 2020 census ===
As of the 2020 census, Medical Lake had a population of 4,874 and a median age of 39.2 years.

21.8% of residents were under the age of 18 and 15.1% were 65 years of age or older, while for every 100 females there were 106.4 males and for every 100 females age 18 and over there were 105.8 males age 18 and over.

As of the 2020 census, 0.0% of residents lived in urban areas, while 100.0% lived in rural areas.

There were 1,751 households in Medical Lake, of which 33.8% had children under the age of 18 living in them; 48.0% were married-couple households, 19.2% were households with a male householder and no spouse or partner present, and 25.0% were households with a female householder and no spouse or partner present. About 26.5% of all households were made up of individuals and 10.4% had someone living alone who was 65 years of age or older.

There were 1,826 housing units, of which 4.1% were vacant. The homeowner vacancy rate was 0.3% and the rental vacancy rate was 3.6%.

Racial composition as of the 2020 census
Race	Number	Percent
White	4,084	83.8%
Black or African American	96	2.0%
American Indian and Alaska Native	60	1.2%
Asian	73	1.5%
Native Hawaiian and Other Pacific Islander	13	0.3%
Some other race	94	1.9%
Two or more races	454	9.3%
Hispanic or Latino (of any race)	278	5.7%

=== 2010 census ===
As of the 2010 census, there were 5,060 people, 1,707 households, and 1,169 families living in the city. The population density was 1,488.2 inhabitants per square mile (574.6/km^{2}). There were 1,835 housing units at an average density of 539.7 per square mile (208.4/km^{2}). The racial makeup of the city was 88.0% White, 2.3% African American, 1.6% Native American, 2.0% Asian, 0.3% Pacific Islander, 1.5% from other races, and 4.3% from two or more races. Hispanic or Latino of any race were 5.7% of the population.

There were 1,707 households, of which 37.7% had children under the age of 18 living with them, 51.0% were married couples living together, 12.2% had a female householder with no husband present, 5.3% had a male householder with no wife present, and 31.5% were non-families. 25.5% of all households were made up of individuals, and 7.1% had someone living alone who was 65 years of age or older. The average household size was 2.55 and the average family size was 3.05.

The median age in the city was 36.8 years. 23.5% of residents were under the age of 18; 10.3% were between the ages of 18 and 24; 28.9% were from 25 to 44; 27.4% were from 45 to 64; and 10% were 65 years of age or older. The gender makeup of the city was 50.0% male and 50.0% female.

=== 2000 census ===
As of the 2000 census, there were 3,758 people, 1,090 households, and 767 families living in the city. The population density was 1,090.8 people per square mile (420.6/km^{2}). There were 1,197 housing units at an average density of 347.4 per square mile (134.0/km^{2}). The racial makeup of the city was 88.88% White, 4.60% African American, 1.41% Native American, 1.57% Asian, 0.21% Pacific Islander, 1.01% from other races, and 2.32% from two or more races. Hispanic or Latino of any race were 4.12% of the population.

There were 1,090 households, out of which 40.8% had children under the age of 18 living with them, 50.4% were married couples living together, 15.1% had a female householder with no husband present, and 29.6% were non-families. 25.1% of all households were made up of individuals, and 7.2% had someone living alone who was 65 years of age or older. The average household size was 2.58 and the average family size was 3.07.

In the city, the age distribution of the population shows 24.3% under the age of 18, 9.1% from 18 to 24, 35.5% from 25 to 44, 22.9% from 45 to 64, and 8.2% who were 65 years of age or older. The median age was 36 years. For every 100 females, there were 108.2 males. For every 100 females age 18 and over, there were 104.2 males.

The median income for a household in the city was $42,159, and the median income for a family was $47,357. Males had a median income of $35,543 versus $23,971 for females. The per capita income for the city was $14,874. About 9.4% of families and 14.8% of the population were below the poverty line, including 12.3% of those under age 18 and 13.7% of those age 65 or over.

== Law enforcement ==
The city of Medical Lake contracts their law enforcement services from the Spokane County Sheriff's Department. The city had its own police department until 2009, when the department was shut down due to a lack of funding.

== Culture ==
- A traditional local parade is held annually on June 15, known as the Founders Day Parade, a celebration of each anniversary to the founding of the town. It is an all day event.
- During the winter season a festival is held annually, featuring a variety of activities, including reindeer petting, fireworks, and more. It is an all day event.

== Education ==
The city of Medical Lake provides primary and secondary education in 3 separate public schools, with K-12 education. Medical Lake School District (#326) services the city of Medical Lake and Fairchild Airforce Base. The District includes Medical Lake High School.
