= 2023 New Mexico wildfires =

Natural disasters in the USA

Impacts
- Cost: Unknown

A series of wildfires burned throughout the U.S. state of New Mexico in 2023.

2023 Pass Fire

== Background ==
While "fire season" can vary every year in New Mexico based on weather conditions, most wildfires occur in from early May through June, before the monsoon season. However, there is an increasing fire risk year-round from climate change. Droughts are becoming more common partly from rising temperatures in the state that evaporate water from streams. Unpredictable monsoon levels can increase fire risks. New Mexico is prone to strong winds, and jet stream disruption from climate change can make them stronger. Intense winds contribute to drought, allow wildfires to spread, and dry out vegetation. Unique plant life and fine fuels in the state fuel wildfires, especially in the Eastern New Mexico grasslands. Rising temperatures will reduce snowpack and shorten the snowmelt season which can increase drought and wildfire severity.

Overgrazing and logging in the late 1800s and over 100 years of strict fire suppression affected natural systems of New Mexico led to a growing wildfire risk and intensity. Scientists predict New Mexico's forests will gradually deteriorate, turning into shrublands as wildfires burn the forests.

== List of wildfires ==
The following is a list of fires that burned more than 1,000 acres (400 ha) or produced significant structural damage or casualties.

Name	County	Acres	Start date	Containment date	Notes	Ref
Mogote	Mora	3,803	February 6	November 3		
Antelope Flats	Socorro	940	April 21	June 16		
Park	Lincoln, Mescalero	3,000	May 3	May 23		
Big Tank	San Miguel	1,181	May 4	May 8		
Pass	Winston	59,883	May 18	October 3	Caused by lightning	
Comanche	Rio Arriba	1,974	June 8	July 24	Caused by lightning	
Dark	Catron	3,975	July 12	September 19		
Divide	Catron	26,514	July 13	August 16		
Davis	Catron	6,073	July 15	September 14		
Turkey	Grant	5,220	July 22	September 28		
Magdalena RD Hutchinson	Socorro	2,816	July 23	2023		
Pasture	Catron	10,500	July 23	August 16		
Black Feather	Rio Arriba	2,198	August 5	2023	Caused by lightning	

== See also ==
- 2023 Arizona wildfires
- 2023 Colorado wildfires
- 2023 California wildfires
- 2023 Oregon wildfires
